= Rappahannock =

Rappahannock may refer to:

== People ==
- Rappahannock people, a Native American people in Virginia, United States
- Rappahannock Tribe, Inc., a federally recognized tribe in Virginia

== Places in the United States ==
- Rappahannock Academy, Virginia, an unincorporated community in Caroline County, Virginia
- Rappahannock County, Virginia
- Rappahannock County (1656), Virginia or "Old Rappahannock" County, divided in 1692 to form Essex County and Richmond County, Virginia

== Rivers ==
- Rappahannock River, a river in eastern Virginia
- Rappahannock River (New Zealand), a river in the Tasman Region of New Zealand

== Education ==
- Rappahannock Academy & Military Institute (1813–1873), a school in Caroline County, Virginia
- Rappahannock Community College, a two-year college located in Glenns and Warsaw, Virginia
- Rappahannock County High School, Washington, Virginia
- Rappahannock Industrial Academy (1902–1948), a school for African-American children that operated near Dunnsville, Virginia

== Military ==
- Battle of Rappahannock River (April 3, 1813) a battle during the War of 1812
- First Battle of Rappahannock Station (August 22–August 25, 1862), a battle in the American Civil War
- Second Battle of Rappahannock Station (November 7, 1863), a battle in the American Civil War

== Ships ==
- CSS Rappahannock, a Confederate Army ship in service from 1864 to 1865
- SS Rappahannock, a Furness Company steamer from Canada that is said to have passed the RMS Titanic; it is controversial whether she actually transmitted an ice warning via Morse lamp to the Titanic
- USS Rappahannock (AF-6), a United States Navy animal transport and store ship in commission from 1917 to 1924
- USS Rappahannock (AOG-2), a United States Navy gasoline tanker in service from 1942 to 1957
- USNS Rappahannock (T-AO-204), a United States Navy fleet replenishment oiler in Military Sealift Command service since 1995

== See also ==
- Rappahannock Academy (disambiguation)
- Tappahannock, Virginia, town in Essex County, Virginia, United States
