= Sandie Pendleton =

Confederate army officer (1840–1864)

Alexander Swift Pendleton
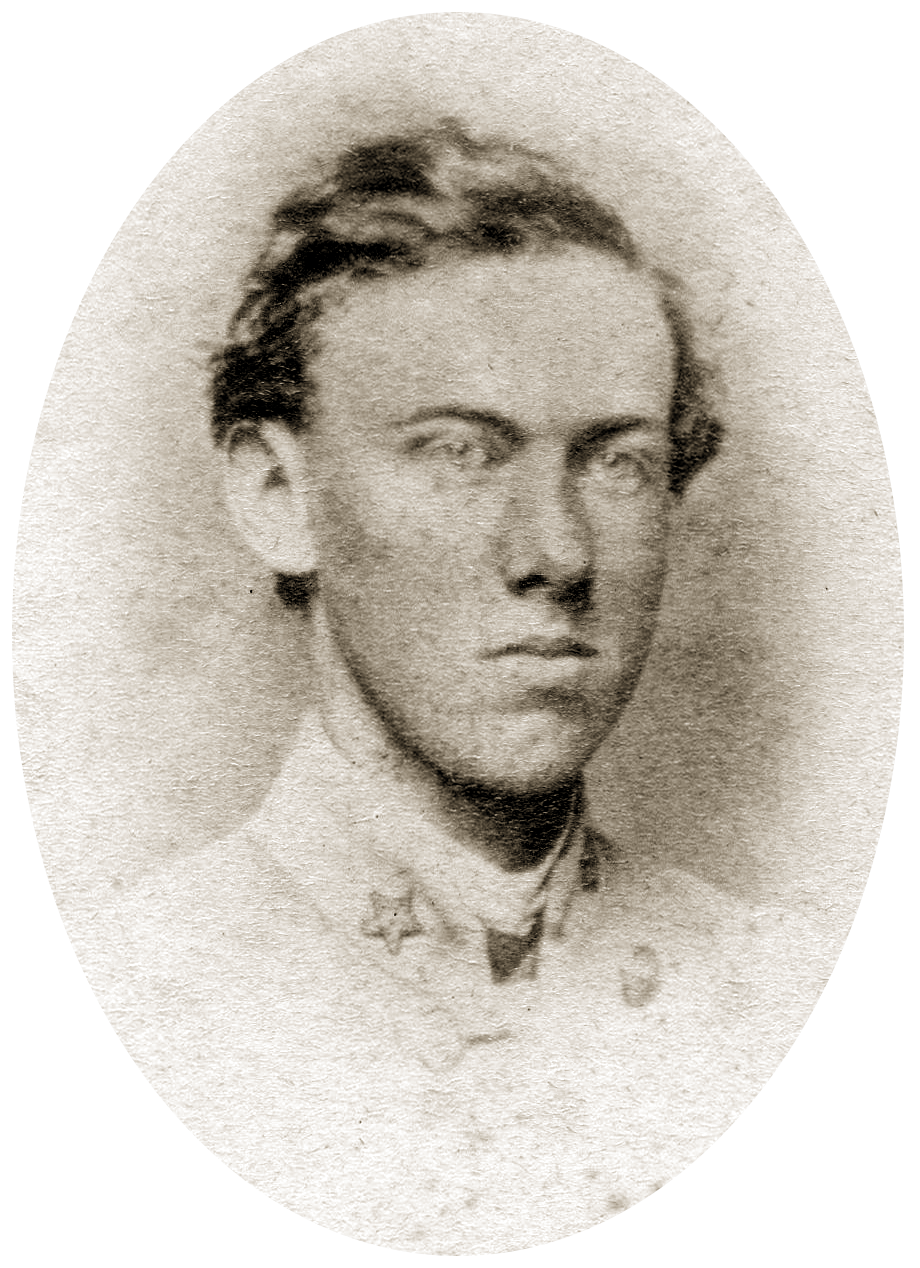
- Born: September 28, 1840; Alexandria, Virginia
- Died: September 23, 1864 (aged 23); Woodstock, Virginia
- Burial place: Oak Grove Cemetery; Lexington, Virginia
- Relatives: Rev. Genl. William Nelson Pendleton, Edmund Pendleton
- Military career
- Allegiance: Confederate States of America
- Branch: Confederate States Army
- Service years: 1861–64
- Rank: Lieutenant Colonel CSA
- Nickname: "Sandie"
- Units: Second Corps staff, Army of Northern Virginia
- Conflicts: American Civil War: First Battle of Bull Run; Jackson's Valley campaign; Maryland campaign; Battle of Fredericksburg; Battle of Chancellorsville; Gettysburg campaign; Third Battle of Winchester; Battle of Fisher's Hill (DOW)

Alexander Swift Pendleton (September 28, 1840 – September 23, 1864) was an officer on the staff of Confederate Generals Thomas J. Jackson, Richard S. Ewell and Jubal A. Early during the American Civil War.

== Early life and career ==
Sandie Pendleton was born in Alexandria, D.C. which is now Alexandria, Virginia, the only son of Episcopal priest and future Confederate General William N. Pendleton and his wife Anzolette Elizabeth Page. His father was the first principal of Episcopal High School in Alexandria, but left in 1844 to establish a private school for boys near Baltimore, Maryland as well as serve as rector of two nearby parishes. Between 1847 and 1853, the Pendleton family lived in Frederick, Maryland while Rev. Pendleton served at All Saints Church (Frederick, Maryland). Sandie studied at a private school for boys, since his parents thought that as the only boy in a household of girls and delicate in health, he needed association with other boys to develop manly qualities, although Sandie also experienced bullying there because of those same issues.

When Sandie was 13, the family moved to Lexington, Virginia, because of the free tuition available at Washington College to ministers' sons, as well as because Latimer Parish (Grace Episcopal Church) offered Rev. Pendleton a job and he thought he could also supplement his income by opening a boarding school for younger boys. Sandie Pendleton completed the course of studies at Washington College in three years, during which he met Maj. Thomas Jackson (later nicknamed Stonewall) of the VMI faculty through the Graham literary society. Sandie graduated at the top of his class in 1857 and delivered the commencement address on the character of Virginia exemplified in the patriots of 1776 such as his ancestors. Along with intellect, honor, and a spirit of independence, Pendleton extolled "a firm adherence to right, and a reverence for the wise and holy ruler of the universe." Sandie Pendleton remained in Lexington for the next two years, teaching mathematics and Latin at his alma mater, as well as helping his father at the school for boys and visiting relatives in Eastern Virginia.

By 1859, Sandie Pendleton had earned enough money to begin studies at the University of Virginia. During his first year, he completed half of the required coursework for a degree, but the civil war broke out in April of his second year, with the fall of Fort Sumter and as Virginia troops went toward Harpers Ferry to seize the federal arsenal. Because his family wanted Sandie to receive his degree on July 1, he sought a deferment to that date from the government in Richmond, but was denied. Thus, pursuant to his commission as a second lieutenant in the Provisional Army of Virginia, Sandie Pendleton left for Harpers Ferry on June 11, having completed only four of seven examinations necessary for the master's degree, and not having submitted the required essay.

== Civil War ==
At Harper's Ferry, Sandie Pendleton reported for duty and temporarily worked with the Rockbridge Artillery, a volunteer unit his father had organized and brought there a few weeks earlier. Soon Stonewall Jackson, commanding the First Brigade of the Army of the Shenandoah (i.e. Confederate forces in Harpers Ferry led by General Joseph E. Johnston), requested young Pendleton join his staff as its ordnance officer. Sandie Pendleton soon showed his capabilities as a staff officer and his valor at the First Battle of Bull Run (a/k/a Manassas, where Jackson got his nickname). He served with distinction in the Valley Campaign and helped transport Jackson's troops to surprise Union forces at Mechanicsville to protect Richmond in June. He then returned with Jackson to the Shenandoah Valley to launch the Maryland Campaign in the summer of 1862, which culminated in the bloody Battle of Antietam. Jackson later promoted him to his staff's adjutant general, and Pendleton continued to serve Jackson (whose exact commands varied) in every battle until the latter's death at the Battle of Chancellorsville in May 1863.

After accompanying Jackson's corpse to its final resting place back at Lexington in the Shenandoah Valley, Pendleton returned to duty with the Second Corps staff under its new commander, Richard S. Ewell during the Gettysburg campaign. In 1864, when Jubal A. Early assumed command of the Second Corps, he promoted Pendleton to chief of staff with the rank of lieutenant colonel. The Second Corps again returned to the Shenandoah Valley that summer, and attempted the last Confederate invasion of the north.

The Union assigned Major General Philip Sheridan to put down resistance in the valley once and for all. Early was defeated at the Third Battle of Winchester on September 19, 1864, forcing the Confederates to retreat to nearby Fisher's Hill. When Union forces attacked on September 22, 1864, Pendleton was fatally wounded in the abdomen. He was moved to the nearby town of Woodstock, where he died the following day. Initially interred near the battlefield, his body was exhumed and returned to his family in Lexington, where he was buried near Stonewall Jackson on October 24, 1864.

== Family and genealogy ==
Sandie Pendleton met Catherine "Kate" Carter Corbin when General "Stonewall" Jackson and his troops were stationed at her father's Moss Neck Manor near Fredericksburg during the winter of 1862. The two were engaged just before the Chancellorsville campaign, and married on December 29, 1863 at Moss Neck Manor. Kate was pregnant at the time of Sandie's death, and gave birth to a son, named Sandie after his father, a month later. The boy contracted diphtheria and died in September 1865. Kate Corbin had moved to Lexington after her marriage, and eventually married former Confederate naval officer and professor John Mercer Brooke. They had three children. She is buried beside her second husband in Lexington, near her first husband and where Stonewall Jackson was originally buried.

Kate Corbin was the daughter of James Parke Corbin, whose family had lived in the Rappahannock River valley for generations. A sister-in-law through Kate's brother, Spotswood Wellford Corbin, was Diana Fontaine Maury-Corbin, daughter of Commander Matthew Fontaine Maury who also had lived in Fredericksburg. Moss Neck Manor still stands and has been renovated. An ancestor of Kate, Richard Corbin succeeded Lord Dunmore when the latter fled Williamsburg, Virginia, and served as royal governor until the beginning of the American Revolution, when he was deposed as a Loyalist.

Sandie's family was also one of the First Families of Virginia. His paternal grandfather was Edmund Pendleton, Jr., the grandnephew and adopted son of Edmund Pendleton. Wm.N. Pendleton's mother was Lucy Nelson, daughter of Hugh Nelson of York County, Virginia and niece of Revolutionary War Governor Thomas Nelson. Anzolette Pendleton was the granddaughter of both Governor Nelson and Governor John Page. Family biographer Susan Pendleton Lee noted the Pendletons, Pages and Nelsons were conspicuous for "their intellectual vigor, unswerving patriotism, honorable discharge of duty in important positions, and devoted piety."

== In popular media ==
Pendleton was portrayed by Jeremy London in the 2003 Civil War film Gods and Generals, and was a minor character in the Jeff Shaara book of the same name.
