= Louis Beauregard Pendleton =

American newspaper editor, columnist, and author (1861–1939)

Louis Beauregard Pendleton (1861–1939) was a newspaper editor, columnist, and author in the state of Georgia in the United States. He wrote novels and young adult literature, many set in the South, as well as a biography of Alexander H. Stephens.

Phillip Coleman Pendleton and Catharine née Tebeau Pendleton were his parents. His father served in the U.S. Army during the Seminole Wars in Florida and the Confederate States Army. He started the Southern Georgia Times and published it until his death in 1869. Louis Beauregard Pendleton was born in Tebeauville, Georgia. Charles Rittenhouse Pendleton and Bishop N. D. Pendleton were two of Louis' 10 siblings. He studied at the Sorbonne in Paris during summers.

He wrote for the Daily Telegraph in Macon, Georgia from 1899 to 1914. He was a member of the Authors' League of America, the Virginia Historical Society, and Franklin Inn of Philadelphia. He never married.

His last book, Echo of Drums, published in 1938 a year before his death was marketed as: "This powerful, dramatic novel is part the story of a Georgia editor's troubles under carpetbag and Negro rule during the reconstruction period after the War between the States. More important than that, it is told from the point of view of Beau Carroll, the editor's son, and his reactions to the scenes he witnesses are significant of the effect upon the adolescent youth of the South of an ugly political and economic situation."

== Writings ==
- Bewitched, Cassell, 1888
- In the Wire-Grass, D. Appleton, 1889
- Corona of the Nantalhalas: a romance 1895
- In the Okefenokee; a story of war time and the great Georgia swamp 1895
- The Sons of Ham, Roberts, 1895
- Carita, Lamson, Wolffe, 1898
- Lost Prince Almon, Jewish Publication Society, 1898
- The Wedding Garment; A Tale of the Life to Come, Little, Brown, 1900
- In Assyrian Tents
- A Forest Drama, Henry T. Coates, 1904
- Captain Ted, D. Appleton, 1918
- The Invisible Police, New-Church, 1932
- Echo of Drums, Sovereign House, 1938

=== Juvenile Fiction ===
- King Tom and the Runaways, D. Appleton, 1890
- In the Okefenokee, Roberts, 1895
- In the Camp of the Creeks, Penn Pub., 1903
- In Assyrian Tents, Jewish Publication Society, 1904

=== Non-Fiction ===
- Alexander H. Stephens, G.W. Jacobs, 1907

== See also ==
- Edmund Pendleton
