= Judy Shelton =

American economist

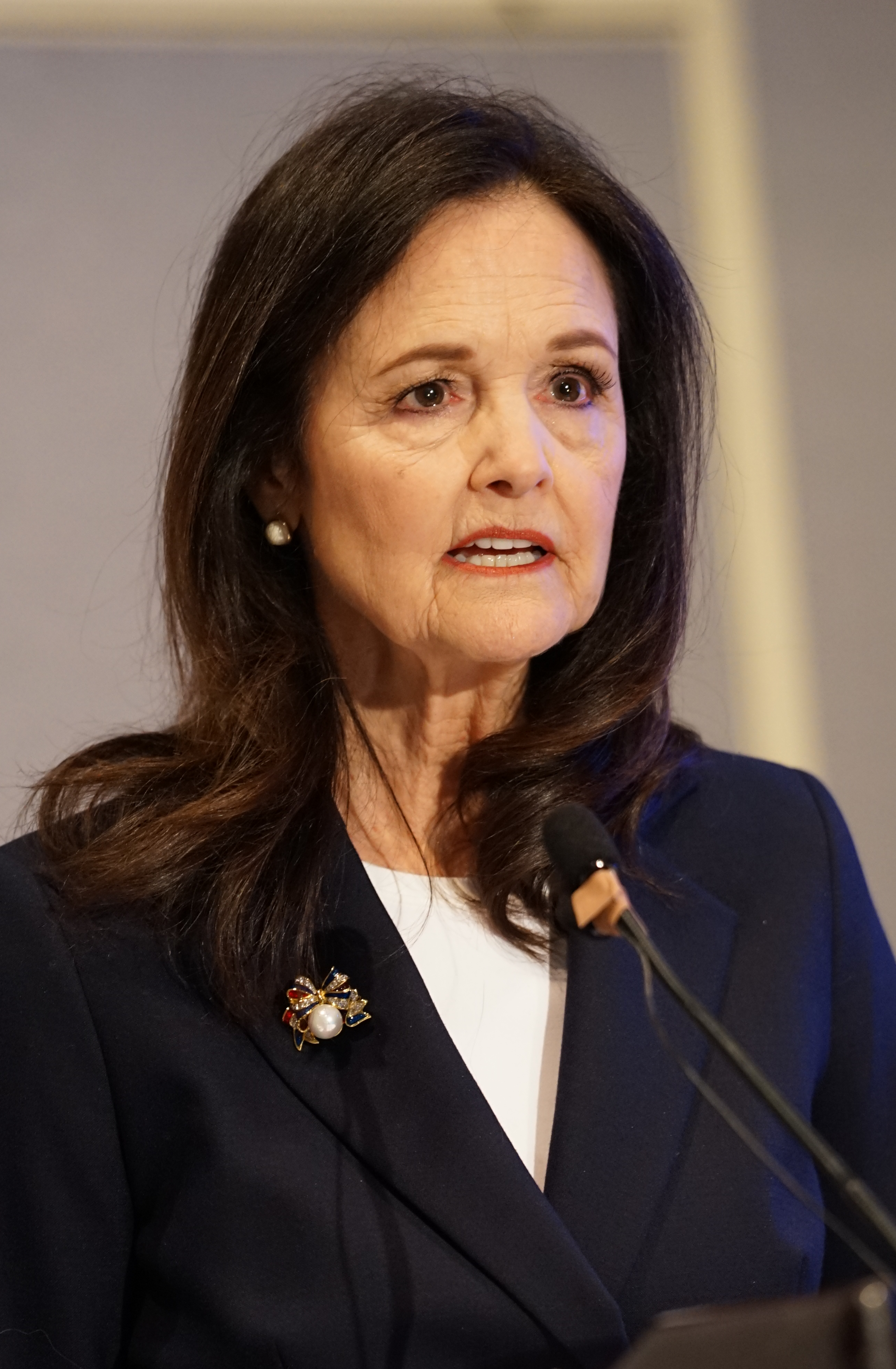
- Shelton in 2026
- Born: Judy Lynn Shelton; 1954 or 1955 (age 71–72); Los Angeles, California, U.S.
- Education: Portland State University (BS); University of Utah (MBA, PhD)
- Political party: Republican
- Spouse: Gilbert Shelton

Judy Lynn Shelton (born 1954/55) is a former American economic advisor to President Donald Trump in his first term. She is known for her advocacy for a return to the gold standard and for her criticisms of the Federal Reserve (which she has compared to the Soviet Union's economic planning). Trump announced on July 2, 2019, that he would nominate Shelton to the Fed. Her nomination stalled on November 17, 2020, with a 47–50 vote in the Senate, and her nomination was eventually withdrawn by President Joe Biden in February 2021.

During the Obama presidency, she advocated for a tight monetary policy, but reversed her position during Trump's first presidency, when Trump advocated for a loose monetary policy (lower interest rates). Her nomination was held up in the Senate, as senators of both parties were skeptical of her. However, shortly after Joe Biden won the presidential election, Senate Republicans appeared to move ahead to confirm her. More than 100 economists, including seven Nobel laureates, signed a letter opposing her confirmation, saying her views were "extreme and ill-considered." She ultimately could not retain enough Republican support after senators Rick Scott (R-Fla.) and Chuck Grassley (R-Iowa) were absent due to exposure to COVID-19, and two present Republicans voted against her and one absent one did not support her.

On October 9, 2026, the U.S. Department of the Treasury announced that Shelton had been hired to advise Secretary of the Treasury Scott Bessent.

== Early life and education ==
Shelton was born in Los Angeles and raised in suburban San Fernando Valley. She is one of five children; her father was a businessman and her mother stayed at home to care for Shelton and her siblings. Shelton attended Portland State University, where she earned her Bachelor of Science in business. Shelton earned her MBA and PhD in business administration from the University of Utah.

== Politics ==
She worked at the Hoover Institution from 1985 to 1995. She worked on Bob Dole's 1996 presidential campaign. In 2016, she worked for the Ben Carson presidential campaign, but joined the Trump campaign in August 2016 after writing a supportive opinion editorial about Trump in The Wall Street Journal.

In 2012, Shelton joined TheGoldStandardNow.Org (a project of the Lehrman Institute) as a senior advisor.

Before joining the Trump administration, she was the director of the Sound Money Project at the Atlas Network. In a video interview with The Atlas Network, she described currency counterfeiter Bernard von NotHaus as "the Rosa Parks of monetary policy." She has donated to conservative candidates and causes.

Shelton worked for the first Trump presidential transition team. After Trump took office, she was appointed as the United States director of the European Bank for Reconstruction and Development (EBRD); the U.S. Senate confirmed the nomination by voice vote in March 2018. The Wall Street Journal reported that she was absent for 12 of 28 board meetings during her tenure. She resigned from her EBRD post in July 2019, while her appointment to the Board of Governors of the Federal Reserve was pending.

=== Views on monetary policy ===
Shelton is a longtime staunch critic of the Federal Reserve. In 2011, she called the Fed "almost a rogue agency" and questioned whether it could be trusted in having oversight of the dollar. "She has called for a 0% inflation target, contradicting the bank's current 2% target. She has written that a "fundamental question" of economics is "why do we need a central bank?" Shelton has criticized the Fed's longstanding policy of independence from the White House, saying in 2019 interview that she saw "no reference to independence" in the Fed's authorizing legislation. Shelton describes herself as "highly skeptical" of the Federal Reserve's "nebulous" dual mandate of maximum employment and price stability.

During the Obama years, she criticized the Federal Reserve's low interest rates. During the Trump presidency, she advocated for the Federal Reserve to adopt lower interest rates as a form of economic stimulus. (Trump frequently criticized the Federal Reserve for not lowering interest rates.) She supported the Republican Party's 2017 tax legislation, and the Trump administration's deregulation agenda. Before Trump became president, she was a longtime advocate for free trade, once advocating for "open borders" with Mexico; after Trump became president, she supported his administration's trade war.

Shelton opposes federal deposit insurance. In her book Money Meltdown, she writes that "Eliminating federal deposit insurance would restore the essential character of banking as a vehicle for channeling financial capital into productive investment while striving to meet the risk and timing preference of depositors."

Shelton is a long-time proponent of pegging the value of the dollar to gold. In 2019, she said that she hoped for a new Bretton Woods-style conference where countries would agree to return to the gold standard, saying, "If it takes place at Mar-a-Lago that would be great." (Mar-a-Lago is a resort run by President Trump.)

In a 2012 piece in the Cato Institute's Cato Journal, Shelton called for the establishment of a "Universal Gold Reserve Bank" with "potential to become a sort of global monetary authority"; she expressed similar views in a 1999 op-ed in the Wall Street Journal. In 2000, she advocated for open borders with Mexico, and said that "even better would be a global common market with a single worldwide currency." She has favored virtual currencies that compete against the U.S. dollar.

=== Failed nomination to Federal Reserve ===
On July 3, 2019, President Donald Trump used his Twitter account to announce his intention to nominate Shelton and a regional Fed official, Christopher Waller, to the Federal Reserve board. His previous nominees, former chairman of the Federal Reserve Bank of Kansas City Omaha Branch, Herman Cain and economic commentator Stephen Moore, had withdrawn for lack of Senate support. During the months in which Shelton was being considered for the post by Trump, she was a guest at the Trump International Hotel, Washington, D.C.

During her February 2020 confirmation hearings, both Republicans and Democrats on the Senate Banking Committee expressed concerns about her writings and statements. On July 21, 2020, a 13–12 vote along party lines advanced Shelton's nomination to the full Senate. On September 15, 2020, Senator John Thune, Republican Whip, announced that Shelton would not be brought up for a vote until she had the 51 votes required to confirm her to the Federal Reserve.

In August, 130 economists, including seven Nobel laureates, recommended the Senate reject her nomination, writing that Shelton was unfit for the post due to her "extreme and ill-considered" views, and writing that rejection of her nomination was needed for Fed to maintain its "nonpartisan approach." Seventy-eight former Federal Reserve economists, attorneys and presidents of Federal Reserve Banks also signed the letter.

Among key Republican senators, Lisa Murkowski supported Shelton's nomination, but Susan Collins, Mitt Romney, and Lamar Alexander came out in opposition to the nomination, leaving Shelton's ability to be confirmed in doubt.

On November 17, 2020, the motion to invoke cloture on the Shelton nomination failed on a 47–50 vote. All Democratic senators (including Vice President-elect Kamala Harris, who had to return to Washington for the vote), along with the Republican senators Romney and Collins, voted against her nomination; Lamar Alexander said that he opposed the nomination, but was not present for the vote. Senators Rick Scott and Chuck Grassley—crucial Republican votes needed to confirm Shelton's nomination—were absent due to quarantine measures enforced after being exposed to COVID-19.

On January 3, 2021, her nomination was returned to the President under Rule XXXI, Paragraph 6 of the United States Senate. When Democrats took control of the Senate in January 2021, Shelton's chances of nomination were effectively ended, and on February 4, 2021, President Joe Biden withdrew her nomination to the Fed.

== Personal life ==
Shelton is married to Gilbert Shelton. The Sheltons had eleven French Charolais cattle, six dogs and peacocks as of 2009. Her husband is a former entrepreneurial banker in Utah, Colorado, and Hawaii who sold his businesses in the early-1980s. They have lived at Moss Neck Manor, a historic antebellum plantation house in Rappahannock Academy, Virginia, since 2005. The property borders Fort Walker.

== Bibliography ==
- Money Meltdown: Restoring Order to the Global Currency System. The Free Press. 2014 [1994]. ISBN 978-1439188460.
- The Coming Soviet Crash: Gorbachev's Desperate Pursuit of Credit in Western Financial Markets. The Free Press. 1989 [1985]. ISBN 978-0029285817. OCLC 25259724.
