= Battle of Rappahannock Station =

Battle of Rappahannock Station may refer to two battles during the American Civil War near modern Remington, Virginia, along the Rappahannock River:

- First Battle of Rappahannock Station, August 23, 1862, a skirmish early in the Second Manassas campaign
- Second Battle of Rappahannock Station, November 7, 1863, a battle during the Bristoe campaign

== See also ==
- Rappahannock (disambiguation)
