= John Mercer Brooke =

American sailor, engineer and scientist

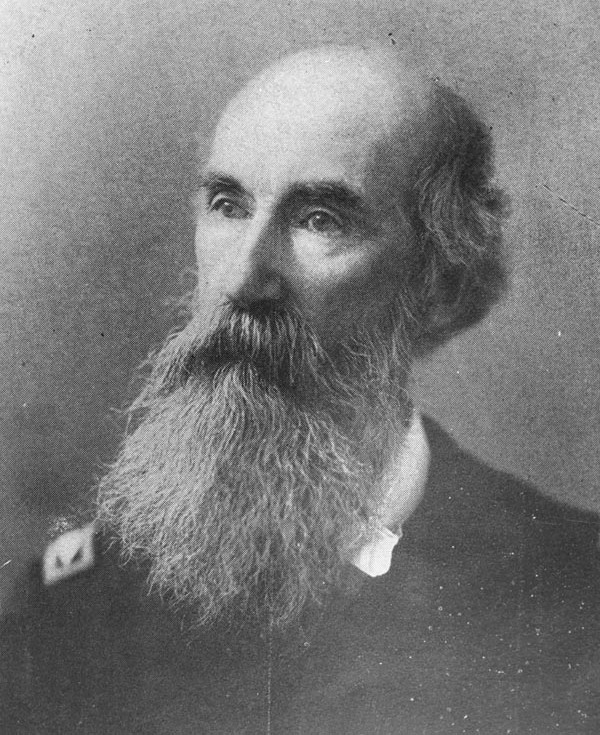
- John Mercer Brooke, c. 1858
- Born: December 18, 1826; Fort Brooke, Florida, U.S.
- Died: December 14, 1906 (aged 79); Lexington, Virginia, U.S.

John Mercer Brooke (December 18, 1826 – December 14, 1906) was an American sailor, engineer, scientist, and educator. He was instrumental in the creation of the Transatlantic Cable, and was a noted marine and military innovator.

== Early life and career ==
John M. Brooke was born in Fort Brooke (modern-day Tampa), Florida. He was related to Congressman John Francis Mercer. His father was an army officer, General George Mercer Brooke, who died in San Antonio, Texas. He was a kinsman of General Dabney Herndon Maury as well as Virginia governor Robert Brooke.

Brooke graduated in 1847 from one of the earliest classes of the United States Naval Academy and became a lieutenant in the United States Navy in 1855. He worked for many years with Commander Matthew Fontaine Maury at the United States Naval Observatory (USNO), charting the stars as well as assisting in taking soundings of the ocean's bottom to determine the shape of the sea floor. Many believed the sea floor was flat, but all previous soundings as deep as eleven miles (18 km) could not find the ocean bottom. Part of this was due to powerful undercurrents far below, rivers in the ocean traveling in various directions. In the struggles with soundings, which nobody had done anything of value at great depths, it was Maury's failure with a unique device he invented that gave Brooke an idea of taking deep sea soundings. Brooke perfected a "deep-sea sounding device" which was used afterwards by navies of the world until modern times and modern equipment replaced it. At Maury's direction, Brooke also added a "core-sampling device" for taking samples of the material of the sea floor.

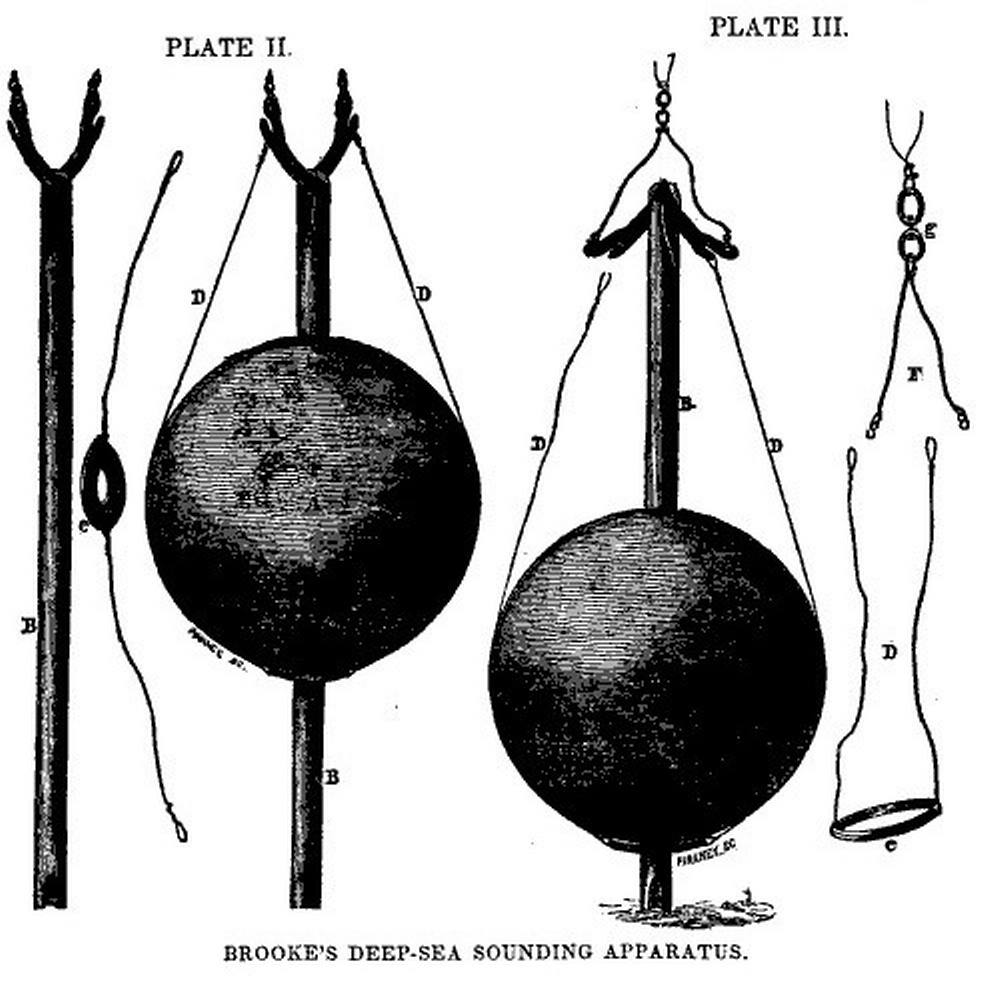
Brooke's deep-sea sounding and core-sampling device

The outcome was a cannonball with a hollow tube through the center of it — a tube coated on the inside so as not to contaminate the samples. Studying this seafloor material with his microscope, Maury saw something that fascinated him. A sample was sent to Jacob Whitman Bailey at the United States Military Academy, who in November 1853 responded:

I was greatly delighted to find that all these deep soundings are filled with microscopic shells; not a particle of sand or gravel exists in them. They are chiefly made up of perfect little calcareous shells (Foraminifera) and contain, also, a small number of silicious shells (Diatomaceae). It is not probable that these animals lived at the depths where these shells are found, but I rather think that they inhabit the waters near the surface; and when they die, their shells settle to the bottom.

== Telegraph ==
The inference in all of this is that the area where the samples came from was the "telegraphic plateau" as called by Maury who had sent out ships to sound those depths at two hundred mile intervals from Newfoundland to Ireland. Maury had charted the underwater mountain ridge. The microscopic organisms left the sea floor on this "telegraphic plateau" were deep and soft so that the area was that of a long mountain chain with the top of those underwater mountains having a firm and soft coating of these dead organisms. This meant that the area was deep enough that no ship's anchor nor any fisherman's net would drag the area. The fact that there was no abrasion on these minute organisms meant that there were no strong currents in that area at that depth. Soon after publishing this, Cyrus West Field wrote to Maury of the USNO on the feasibility of laying a transatlantic cable and was given a positive reply and later details explanation face to face. Cyrus Field also contacted Samuel Morse regarding the feasibility of transmitting an electric current a distance of 1,600 miles (2,600 km) underwater. Again, Field was given an affirmative and soon visited Morse. Cyrus Field continued contacting these two men, Maury and Morse, gathering all possible information and offered them shares in his great adventure that would become a reality in 1858 when the Queen of the United Kingdom communicated with President Buchanan in Morse code through the transatlantic cable.

== Later career ==
As an expert in maritime surveys, he participated in exploratory missions in the Pacific. He served in the North Pacific Exploring and Surveying Expedition on the USS Vincennes and was in charge of the astronomical department. On his return to the United States, he worked with Commodore John Rodgers to prepare the official charts and records of the expedition. In 1858, he returned to sea on the USS Fenimore Cooper to map the topography of the north Pacific seafloor and to survey the east coast of Japan. After the Fenimore Cooper was wrecked in a typhoon off Yokohama in 1859, he had a role in the counseling and instruction of officers of the nascent Japanese Navy and returned to the United States as a technical adviser aboard the Japanese steamer Kanrin Maru in February 1860. He was accompanied by Japanese representatives aboard the USS Powhatan.

In 1861, Brooke resigned from the U.S. Navy to join the Confederate Navy. He was involved in the conversion of the frigate USS Merrimack into the ironclad CSS Virginia. He was also instrumental in the development of a new rifled gun for the Navy that became known as the Brooke rifle. In 1862, he was promoted to commander, and in 1863, to Chief of the Confederate Navy's Bureau of Ordnance and Hydrography, until the end of the war. He was instrumental in the organization and establishment of the Confederate States Naval Academy.

After the war, he became a professor of physics and astronomy at the Virginia Military Institute, at Lexington, Virginia. He retired in Lexington in 1899. He died there in 1906 and is buried in its Oak Grove Cemetery.

== Family life ==
John Mercer Brooke's parents were George Mercer Brooke, b. 1785 (Va.) and Lucy Thomas.

John Mercer Brooke married:

1. Mary Elizabeth Selden Garnett, b. 1 Mar 1826 who died. They had one daughter named Anna Maria Brooke, b. 12 Dec 1856 who never married.
2. Catherine Carter "Kate" Corbin, the widow of Alexander Swift "Sandie" Pendleton kia September 22, 1864.

John Mercer Brooke and Catherine Carter "Kate" Corbin of Moss Neck Manor (and widow of Sandie Pendleton) married on 14 Mar 1871 at St. George's Episcopal Church (Fredericksburg, Virginia). John and "Kate" had three children:--

1. George Mercer Brooke II b. 17 May 1875 (Father of George Mercer Brooke Jr.)
2. Rosa Johnston Brooke, b. 1876
3. Richard Corbin Brooke, b. 1878

John Mercer Brooke and Catherine Carter "Kate" Corbin-Pendelton-Brooke are buried beside each other in Oak Grove Cemetery, Lexington, Virginia.

== Legacy and honors ==
During World War II the Liberty ship SS John M. Brooke was built in Panama City, Florida, and named in his honor.

The US Navy honored his career by naming Brooke (FFG-1), the namesake of the Brooke-class frigate, after him.
