= Richard Corbin (delegate) =

American planter and politician

Member of the Virginia House of Delegates for King and Queen County, Virginia
- In office December 3, 1798 – November 30, 1800 Serving with Henry Young, Larkin Smith
- Preceded by: Richard Brooke
- Succeeded by: Benjamin Dabney

Member of the Virginia House of Delegates for Middlesex County, Virginia
- In office November 8, 1796 – December 2, 1798 Serving with William Segar
- Preceded by: Thomas Churchill
- Succeeded by: Norborne Berkeley

Personal details
- Born: December 2, 1771 Laneville plantation, King and Queen County, Colony of Virginia
- Died: June 10, 1819 (aged 47) Laneville plantation, King and Queen County, Virginia
- Resting place: Christ Church cemetery, Middlesex County, Virginia
- Spouse: Rebecca Farley of Antigua
- Children: at least 3 sons and 3 daughters
- Parent(s): John Tayloe Corbin, Maria Waller
- Relatives: Richard Corbin (grandfather)
- Occupation: planter, officer, politician

Military service
- Branch/service: Virginia militia
- Rank: Captain
- Battles/wars: War of 1812

Richard Corbin (December 2, 1771 – June 10, 1819) was a Virginia planter, officer and politician who at times represented Middlesex County and King and Queen County in the Virginia House of Delegates.

== Early life and education ==
Born to the former Maria Waller, daughter of burgess and judge Benjamin Waller of Williamsburg, and her husband, John Tayloe Corbin (1739–1794), he was descended from the First Families of Virginia. His name honors his grandfather, Richard Corbin who had been a member of the Virginia Governor's Council before the American Revolutionary War, and who died when this boy was a teenager. During his childhood, his father had been imprisoned for Loyalist activities, but posted a bond and agreed to stay on his Caroline County properties until the conflict ended. Like his brother and cousins, this Richard Corbin received a private education appropriate to his class.

His younger brother Gawin Lane Corbin (1778–1821) moved to the Kings Creek Plantation in York County, which their father purchased shortly before his death, and became a Virginia militia hero of in the War of 1812 after representing that county in the Virginia House of Delegates.

== Career ==
Like his father and grandfather, Corbin was a planter, who farmed using enslaved labor. His primary plantation was Laneville in King and Queen County. Other plantations were Corbin Hall, Moss's Neck, Farley Vale and Nesting Green Branch. In the 1810 census, he owned 73 enslaved people in King and Queen County. Furthermore, in that same census, although not a resident of Middlesex County, he paid taxes on 62 enslaved people. A decade later, although this man had died the previous year, the censustakers made three listings on the same page for "R P Corbin", for 20, 15 and 59 slaves, in addition to his nephew Richard Randolph Corbin (1801–1855) with one slave.

Corbin raised, led and supported an artillery company in the War of 1812. Although family sources indicate his rank as "Major", the payroll from March 1813 indicates his rank as "Captain" and having been based as Smithfield under Col. F.M. Boykin. He presumably received promotions while continuing to lead militia after the conflict.

Middlesex County voters elected Richard Corbin to the Virginia House of Delegates in 1796. Then King and Queen County voters elected this Richard Corbin and Henry Young as their representatives in the Virginia House of Delegates, and re-elected both men once, then Larkin Smith replaced Young.

== Personal life ==
He married Rebecca Farley of Antigua, the daughter of James Parke Farley and granddaughter of Col. William Byrd III of Westover plantation in Virginia. They had two sons. John Tayloe Corbin (1795–1815) named to honor this man's father (but with the same name as his cousin who lived at Gales plantation in Middlesex County), died at Carlisle College in Pennsylvania of wounds received in a duel. James Parke Corbin (1809–1868), who thus became this man's principal heir, married twice, moved to Caroline County where he built Moss Neck plantation and survived the American Civil War. Two of their daughters married into the Fauntleroy family of Middlesex County.

== Death and legacy ==
He died at Laneville, which was inherited by his son James Parke Corbin, who lived there until it burned in 1843, but chose not to rebuild the showpiece. Instead, he may have resided at plantation called Dixon's which his grandfather had acquired adjacent to the family's Moss Neck plantation in Caroline County. At Moss Neck, James Parke Corbin built a showpiece mansion, where he moved in 1856, and where the family graveyard also remains. Three of his grandsons fought for the Confederate States of America. His namesake, private Henry Corbin (1833–1863) joined the 9th Virginia Cavalry, fought in many battles, including the Battle of Gettysburg, and died near Culpepper Courthouse. Another grandson, Spottswood Wellford Corbin (1835–1897) became a Confederate naval officer and after being paroled, became a major farmer in King George County and member of the state board of agriculture. His youngest full brother, James Parke Corbin Jr. (1847–1904) while a student at the Virginia Military Institute fought at the Battle of New Market, and later became a prominent freemason as well as clerk of the court in Fredericksburg. Some of his and his family's papers are held by the Library of Virginia.
