= Rappahannock Academy =

Rappahannock Academy may refer to:

- Rappahannock Academy, Virginia, an unincorporated community in Caroline County, Virginia
- Rappahannock Academy & Military Institute, a defunct military academy
- Rappahannock Industrial Academy, a school for African Americans
