= Moss Neck Manor =

Historic house in Virginia, United States

- U.S. National Register of Historic Places
- Virginia Landmarks Register
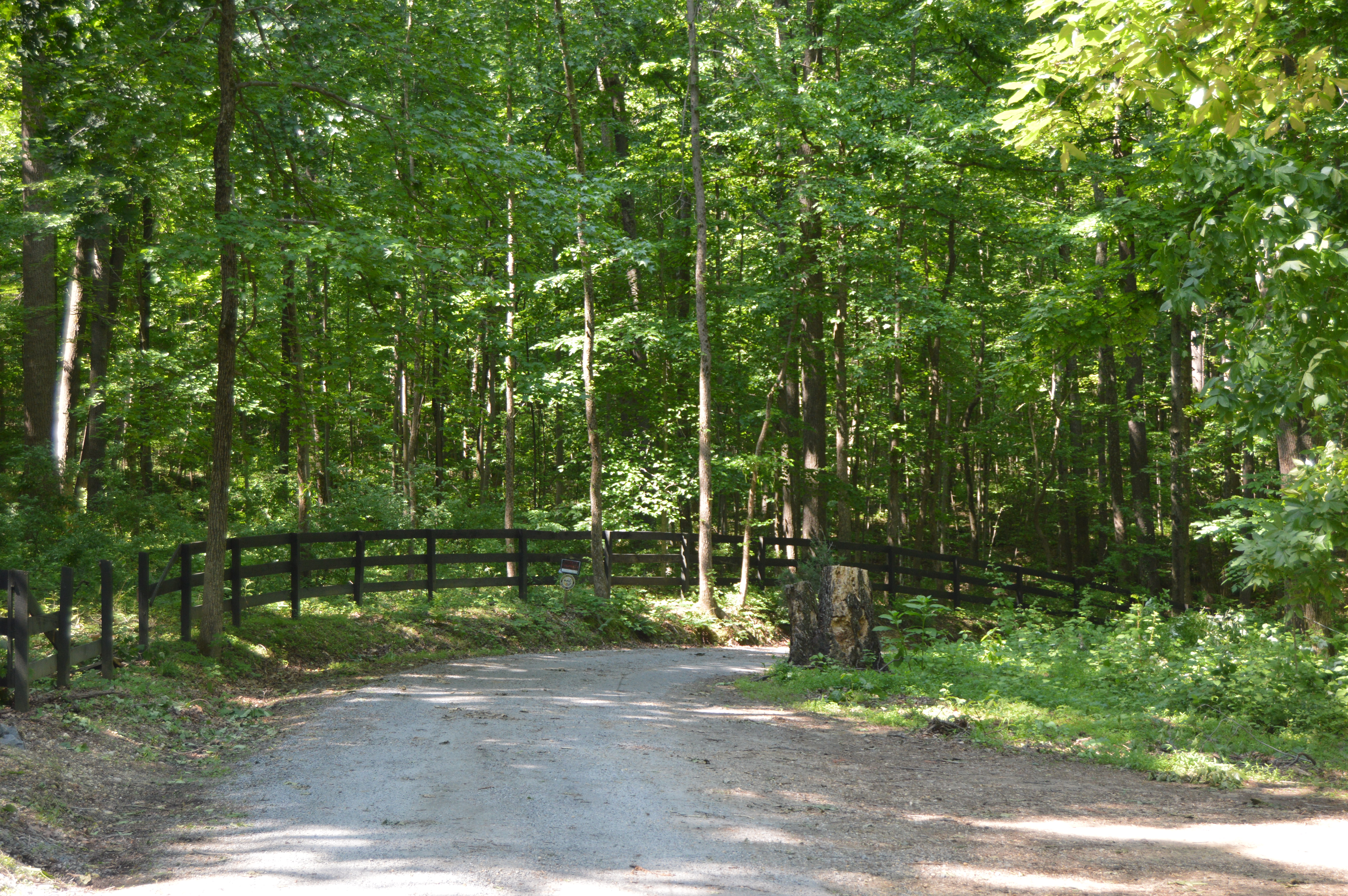
- Property entrance

- Location within Virginia Location within the United States
- Location: VA 766, S side of Rappahannock R., Rappahannock Academy, Virginia
- Coordinates: 38°12′30.528″N 77°19′32.772″W
- Area: 280 acres (110 ha)
- Built: 1856
- Architectural style: Mid 19th Century Revival
- NRHP reference No.: 99000069
- VLR No.: 016-0018

Significant dates
- Added to NRHP: January 27, 1999
- Designated VLR: December 10, 1998

Moss Neck Manor is a historic antebellum plantation house located at Rappahannock Academy, Caroline County, Virginia, United States.

== Construction ==
James Parke Corbin (1808-1868) inherited the plantation, which did not have a significant house, from his father, Richard Corbin (1771-1819). After his and his father's main plantation house, Laneville in King and Queen county, burned in 1843, Corbin began construction of the manor in the then-popular Greek Revival style. Enslaved labor probably both helped construct the building, as well as provided the income for the building project. In the 1850 census, Corbin owned 33 enslaved people in King and Queen County, and about 100 in Caroline County.

The house was completed in 1856, shortly after the death of his first wife, the former Jane Katherine Wellford. She had already borne three sons, all of whom would fight for the Confederacy: Richard Corbin (1833-1863), Spottswood Wellford Corbin (1835-1897), and James Parke Corbin Jr.(1847-1909). Their younger daughter Katherine (1839-1920) would marry CSA staff officer Sandie Pendleton during the conflict.

The two-story central section features long hyphens, and pedimented terminal wings. The colonnaded verandahs have Doric order columns, a two-level portico, and octagonal cupola. The house measures 225 feet long. It was listed on the National Register of Historic Places in 1999.

== Civil War ==
Moss Neck Manor, situated about 10 miles from the site of the Battle of Fredericksburg, was then owned by the Corbin family. The Corbins invited General Stonewall Jackson to stay at Moss Neck Manor during the winter of 1862–63. He declined to stay in the main house, but accepted the use of an office outbuilding. Moss Neck Plantation became the winter quarters of the Second Corps of the Army of Northern Virginia.

Jackson entertained Confederate generals Robert E. Lee, Jeb Stuart, and William N. Pendleton in the office on Christmas Day, 1862. The event was inaccurately depicted in the film, Gods and Generals.

Mrs. Thomas Jackson (Anna) with infant daughter, Julia Jackson, arrived by train at Guiney's Station on April 20, 1863, for a visit with General Jackson. They stayed at nearby Belvoir. Julia Jackson was baptized by the Reverend Tucker Lacy three days later. The visit ended suddenly nine days later when a report came that Union forces had crossed the Rappahannock River near Chancellorsville, Virginia.

== Today ==
The 290-acre property is privately owned by Gilbert and Judy Shelton. The house has been renovated and updated and is occasionally open for tour.
