= USS Brooke =

Guided-missile frigate of the United States and later Pakistan

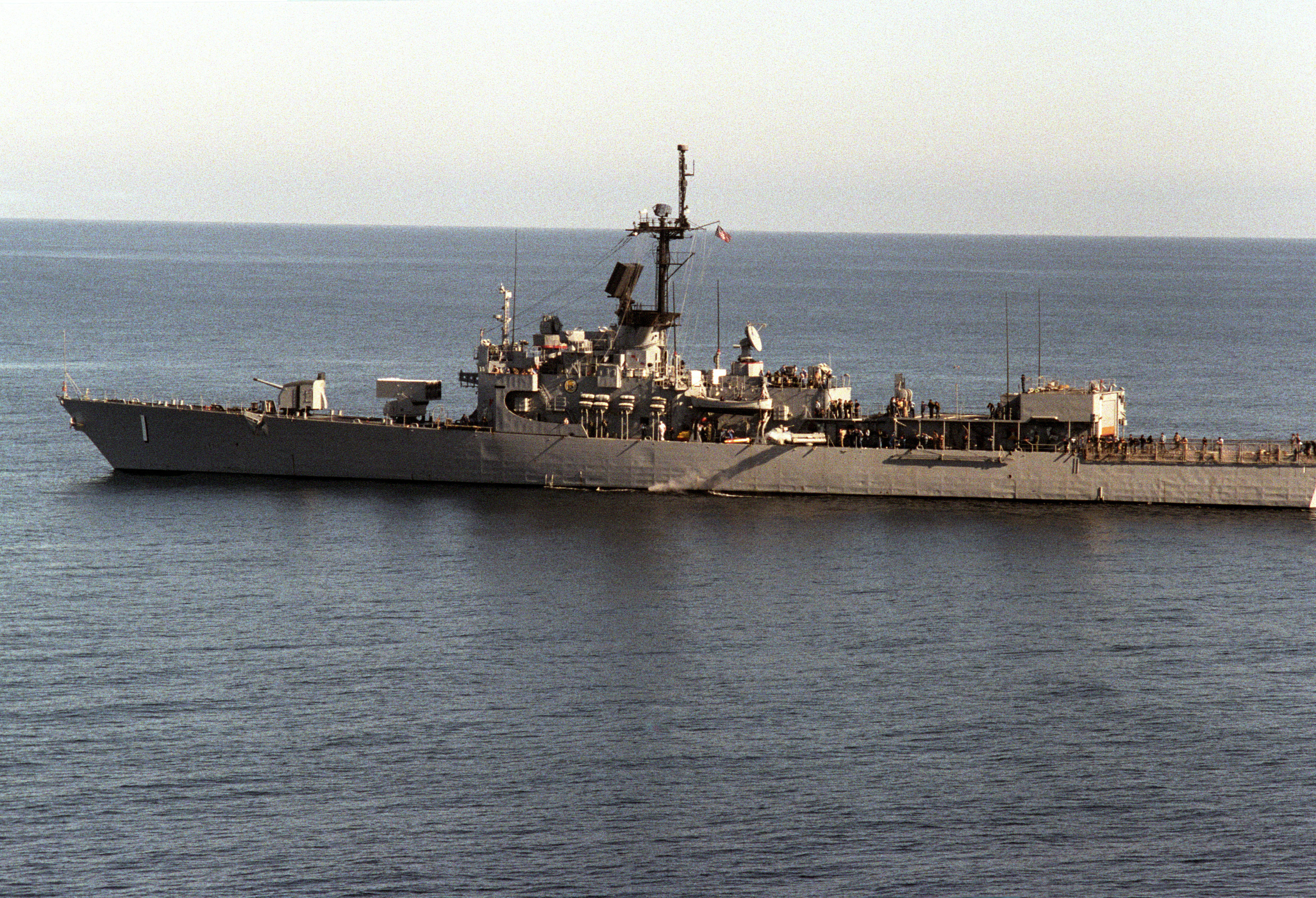
- USS Brooke (FFG-1)

History

United States
- Name: Brooke
- Namesake: John Mercer Brooke
- Ordered: 4 January 1962
- Builder: Lockheed Shipbuilding and Construction Company, Seattle, Washington
- Laid down: 19 December 1962
- Launched: 19 July 1963
- Acquired: 7 March 1966
- Commissioned: 12 March 1966
- Decommissioned: 16 September 1988
- Stricken: 2 January 1994
- Motto: Prima et Optima (English: First and Finest)
- Fate: Disposed of by Navy title transfer to the Maritime Administration, 28 March 1994
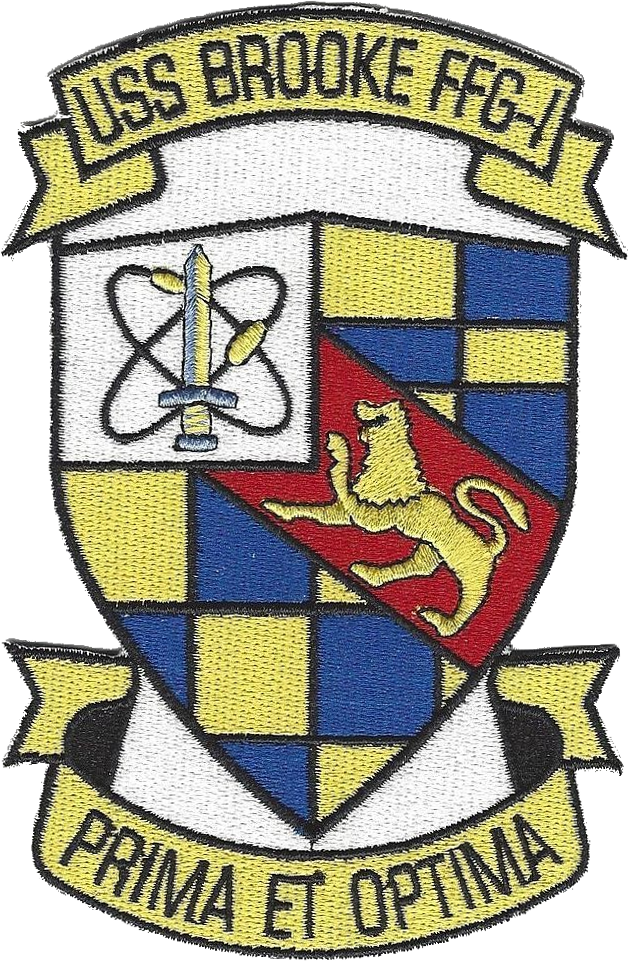
- Badge

General characteristics
- Class & type: Brooke-class frigate
- Displacement: 5,400 tons
- Length: 390 ft (120 m)
- Beam: 44 ft (13 m)
- Draft: 14 ft 6 in (4.42 m)
- Propulsion: 2 Foster-Wheeler boilers, 1 Westinghouse geared turbine
- Speed: 27.2 knots (50.4 km/h)
- Range: 4,000 nautical miles (7,000 km)
- Complement: 14 officers, 214 crew
- Sensors & processing systems: AN/SPS-52 3D air search radar; AN/SPS-10 surface search radar; AN/SPG-51 missile fire control radar; AN/SQS-26 bow mounted sonar
- Electronic warfare & decoys: AN/SLQ-32; AN/SLQ-25 Nixie
- Armament: 1 × 5"/38 caliber gun; 1 × Mk 22 RIM-24 Tartar/RIM-66 Standard missile launcher (16 missiles); 1 × 8 cell ASROC launcher; 2 × triple 12.75 in (324 mm) Mk 32 torpedo tubes, Mk 46 torpedoes (6 torpedoes); 1 × twin Mk 25MK 37 torpedo tubes (fixed, stern, removed later) (8 torpedoes)
- Aircraft carried: SH-2 Seasprite

USS Brooke (FFG-1) was the lead ship of her class of guided missile frigates in the United States Navy from 1962 to 1988. She was named for John Mercer Brooke. As of 2021, no other ship in the United States Navy has been named Brooke.

Laid down on 19 December 1962 by Lockheed Ship Building, Brooke was launched on 19 July 1963 and commissioned on 12 March 1966. Originally designated DEG-1, she was redesignated FFG-1 in 1975. She served in the Pacific Fleet and was homeported in San Diego, California.

== Pakistan service ==
Following decommissioning in 1988, she was transferred to Pakistan on 1 February 1989. Renamed Khaibar, she was returned to the United States on 14 November 1993 and sold for scrap on 29 March 1994.

== Ship awards ==
- Navy Meritorious Unit Commendation (2)
- Navy Battle "E" Ribbon
- National Defense Service Medal
- Armed Forces Expeditionary Medal
- Vietnam Service Medal (6)
- Navy Sea Service Deployment Ribbon
- Republic of Vietnam Campaign Medal
