= Edmund Pendleton =

American planter, politician, lawyer, and judge (1721–1803)

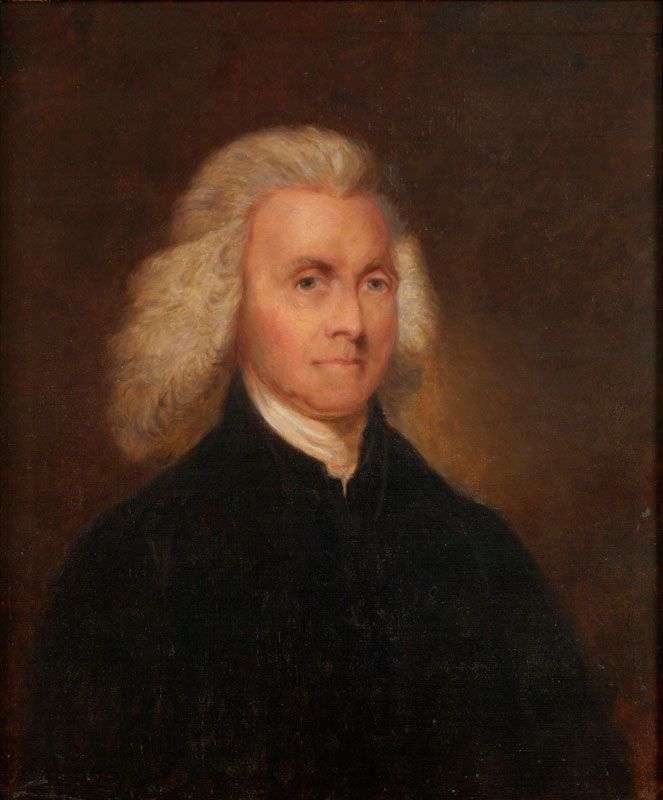
- Posthumous portrait, c. 1850

1st Chief Justice of Virginia
- In office December 24, 1788 – October 23, 1803
- Preceded by: Position established
- Succeeded by: Peter Lyons

Governor of Virginia
- Acting; August 16, 1775 – July 5, 1776
- Preceded by: Position established
- Succeeded by: Patrick Henry

Speaker of the Virginia House of Delegates
- In office 1776–1777
- Preceded by: Position established
- Succeeded by: George Wythe

Personal details
- Born: September 9, 1721 Caroline County, Colony of Virginia, British America
- Died: October 23, 1803 (aged 82) Edmundsbury, Caroline County, Virginia, U.S.
- Resting place: Bruton Parish Episcopal Church Cemetery (Williamsburg, Virginia, U.S.)
- Party: Federalist (informally)
- Spouse(s): 1st, Elizabeth Roy, 2nd, Sarah Pollard
- Occupation: Lawyer, judge, delegate to First Continental Congress

Edmund Pendleton (September 9, 1721 – October 23, 1803) was an American planter, politician, lawyer, and judge. He served in the Virginia legislature before and during the American Revolutionary War, becoming the first speaker of the Virginia House of Delegates (which succeeded the House of Burgesses terminated by Virginia's last colonial Governor, Lord Dunmore). Pendleton attended the First Continental Congress as one of Virginia's delegates alongside George Washington and Patrick Henry, signed the Continental Association, and led the conventions both wherein Virginia declared independence (1776) and adopted the United States Constitution (1788).

Unlike his sometime political rival Henry, Pendleton was a moderate who initially hoped for reconciliation rather than revolt. With Thomas Jefferson and George Wythe, Pendleton revised Virginia's legal code after the break with Britain. To contemporaries, Pendleton may have distinguished himself most as a judge, particularly in the appellate roles in which he spent his final 25 years, including leadership of what is now known as the Supreme Court of Virginia.

On hearing of his death, Congress agreed to wear badges of mourning for 30 days and expressed "their regret that another star is fallen from the splendid constellation of virtue and talents which guided the people of the United States, in their struggle for independence".

== Early life ==
Pendleton was born in Caroline County, Virginia, to Mary Bishop Taylor, whose young husband (and father of her six other children), Henry Pendleton, had died four months earlier. Pendleton's maternal grandfather, James Taylor, was a large landowner in nearby Rappahannock County and may have helped raise the children until the widow remarried Edward Watkins two years later. James Taylor was born near Winchester in Hampshire, England in 1671 and had emigrated to America as a child with his parents in 1679. Pendleton's paternal grandfather, Philip Pendleton was born in Norwich, England in 1650 and emigrated to America in 1674. When Edmund was 14 years old, he became apprenticed to Benjamin Robinson, clerk of the Caroline County Court, which is where he learned about political issues and soon began reading law books and learning legal procedures. In 1737, Pendleton was made clerk of the vestry of St. Mary's Parish in Caroline, which began his involvement with practical church-related matters which would continue throughout his life.

== Career ==
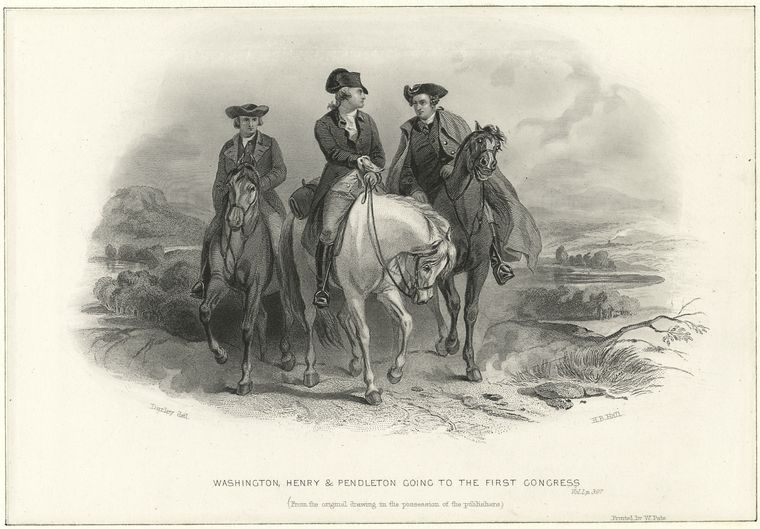
Washington, Henry & Pendleton going to the First Congress, lithograph, Henry Bryan Hall

Pendleton received a license to practice law in April 1741. His success before nearby county courts, including as the prosecuting attorney for Essex County, allowed Pendleton to become a member of the General Court bar in October 1745. When attorneys were forbidden to practice before both courts, Pendleton chose the General Court and wrapped up his lower court practice—which allowed him to accept appointment as a justice of the peace for Caroline County in 1751. Pendleton also trained many young lawyers, including his nephews John Penn (later one of the signers of the Declaration of Independence) and John Taylor of Caroline (who became a U.S. Senator).

From 1752 to 1776, Pendleton represented Caroline County in the House of Burgesses. In May 1766, his mentor, the powerful speaker John Robinson died, and Pendleton was appointed one of the executors, thus becoming involved in the John Robinson estate scandal throughout the rest of his legal career.

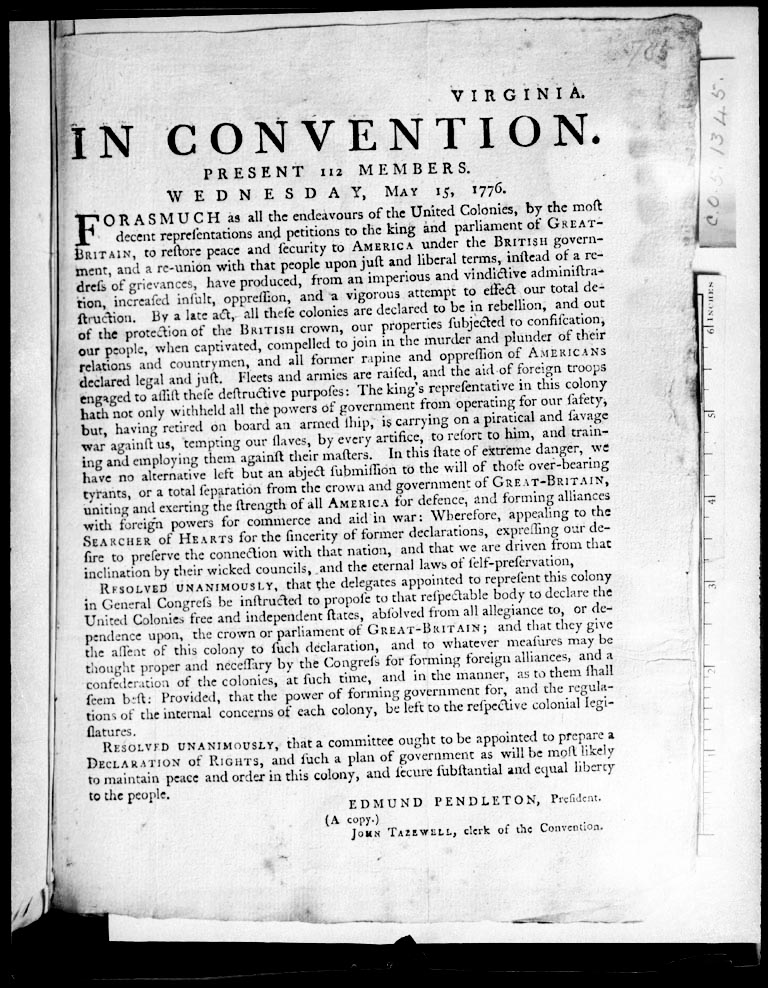
Sent to Virginia Delegation to the Continental Congress and Richard Henry Lee to move for Independence Lee Resolution June 7, 1776.

Pendleton was on the Virginia Committee of Correspondence in 1773 and was a delegate to Continental Congress from Virginia in 1774. A moderate among the revolutionaries, in a resolution at the Second Continental Congress he said: "The ground and foundation of the present unhappy dispute between the British Ministry and Parliament and America, is a Right claimed by the former to tax the Subjects of the latter without their consent, and not an inclination on our part to set up for independency, which we utterly disavow and wish to restore to a Constitutional Connection upon the most solid and reasonable basis."

Pendleton served as president of the Virginia Committee of Safety from August 16, 1775, to July 5, 1776 (effectively serving as governor of the colony), and as president of the Virginia Convention which authorized Virginia's delegates to propose a resolution to move for the break from Britain and create a Declaration of Independence. The Convention debated the Virginia Declaration of Rights, drafted by George Mason, which served as a model for the Declaration of Independence. Pendleton proposed the modification in the statement of universal rights in Virginia's declaration to exclude slaves, thus winning support of slave owners.

Fellow delegates elected Pendleton the first speaker of Virginia's new House of Delegates, although he dislocated his hip in a fall from a horse in March 1777 which caused him to miss the first session. He used crutches the rest of his life. Pendleton, along with Thomas Jefferson and George Wythe, revised Virginia's law code. He became judge of the High Court of Chancery in 1777. When Virginia created a Supreme Court of Appeals in 1778, Pendleton was appointed its first president and served until his death. In 1788 delegates unanimously selected Pendleton president of the Virginia Ratifying Convention; an event held at the Richmond Theatre. When Wythe took the chair, Pendleton addressing colleagues thus: "...the people by us are peaceably assembled, to contemplate in the calm lights of mild philosophy, what Government is best calculated to promote their happiness, and secure their liberty. This I am sure we shall effect, if we do not lose sight of them by too much attachment to pictures of beauty, or horror, in our researches into antiquity, our travels for examples into remote regions".

== Family ==
Pendleton married twice. He married Betty Roy on January 21, 1741, but she died in childbirth on November 16, 1742, and their infant son died shortly thereafter. On June 20, 1743, Pendleton married Sarah Pollard, daughter of Joseph Pollard and Priscilla Hoomes. Edmund and Sarah had no children, but in his extensive correspondence with contemporaries he often referred to their marriage as happy.

Since Pendleton had no direct descendants, his nieces, nephews, grandnieces, and grandnephews became his heirs. Pendleton did not grant freedom to any slaves in his will, unlike George Washington who similarly died without direct descendants, and Wythe who freed all his slaves in his lifetime. His brother John Pendleton's son, also named Edmund Pendleton (1743–1827), added "Jr." to distinguish himself from the judge whose principal heir he became. His oldest brother, James Pendleton, 19 years his senior, died in 1762 and left a large estate in Culpeper that Edmund administered for the widow and four children.

Many relatives were named after the judge, including grandnephews Edmund Pendleton (1776–1820, Edmund Jr.'s son), Edmund Pendleton (1790–1823, son of Nathaniel Pendleton's son Philip), Edmund Pendleton (1786–1838, son of Henry Pendleton), and General Edmund Pendleton Gaines (1777–1849). His nephew Nathaniel Pendleton, Jr. distinguished himself in the American Revolution as an aide to General Nathaniel Greene, and United States district judge for Georgia. He served as Hamilton's second in the duel with Burr. His son Edmund Henry Pendleton (1788–1862) also became a judge, as well as a U.S. congressman for New York. Another descendant, Edmund Monroe Pendleton (1815–1884), distinguished himself in developing fertilizer products, and became a professor of agriculture and horticulture at the University of Georgia.

Philip Clayton Pendleton (1779–1863) also served as a United States District Judge, and Philip P. Barbour (1783–1841) served as an Associate Justice of the United States Supreme Court after serving as Speaker of the United States House of Representatives (his brother James Barbour was Virginia's 18th governor as well as later a United States Senator and Secretary of War). Edmund Henry Pendleton (1843–1910) served in the 4th New York artillery as a Union staff officer in the Civil War; Reverend and Brigadier General William Nelson Pendleton (1809–1883) commanded the Rockbridge Artillery and Confederate artillery units in that war, and his son Sandie Pendleton (1840–1864) became a distinguished staff officer before dying in the Valley campaigns of 1864.

== Death and legacy ==
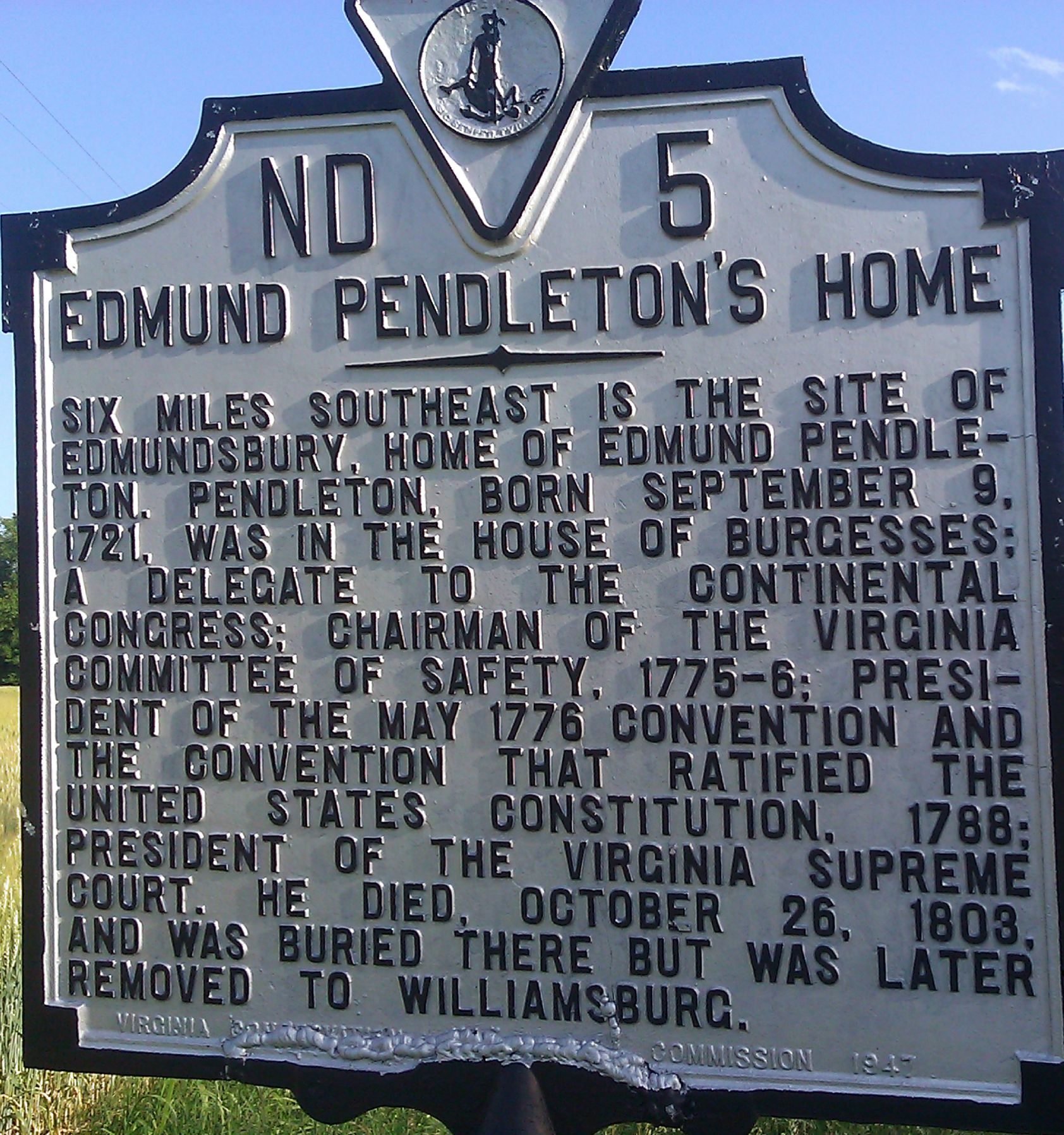
Pendleton marker off Richmond Highway

Pendleton died in 1803, and after lying in state in Richmond he was buried at his home, Edmundsbury, in Caroline County. Because of the ravages of time upon the estate's buildings, his body was removed circa 1907 and moved to Bruton Parish Church in what became Colonial Williamsburg. A memorial to Pendleton is located near the former estate. Pendleton County, West Virginia (formed 1788) and Pendleton County, Kentucky (formed 1798) are both named in Pendleton's honor.

== See also ==
- Fifth Virginia Convention
- Virginia Ratifying Convention
