= George Mercer Brooke =

George Mercer Brooke (October 16, 1785 – March 9, 1851) was a brevet major general in the U.S. Army. While a colonel, Brooke was ordered in 1823, along with James Gadsden, to establish a military presence in the vicinity of Tampa Bay, in the newly acquired Florida Territory.

Objectives included containing the Seminole Indians and curtailing illegal activities along the Gulf Coast.

== Background ==
Brooke was born in King William County, Virginia, to Richard Brooke (1760–1816), a planter and state senator, and Maria Mercer Brooke (1761-?).

He married Lucy Thomas Brooke (1804–1839) and fathered John Mercer Brooke (1826–1906).

== Career ==
Brooke was commissioned as a first lieutenant in May 1808, and served during the War of 1812. He and four full companies of the U.S. 4th Infantry Regiment from Pensacola established 'Cantonment Brooke" on 10 January 1824 at the mouth of the Hillsborough River, near where today's Tampa Convention Center is located in downtown Tampa. The site was marked by a huge hickory tree atop an ancient Indian mound most likely built by the Tocobaga culture centuries before. Brooke directed his troops to clear the area for the construction of a wooden log fort and support buildings. He ordered that several ancient live oak trees inside the encampment be spared to provide shade and cheer. In 1824, the post was officially rechristened Fort Brooke.

On June 10, 1846, he was appointed commander of the Western Division of the United States Army, taking over for General Edmund P. Gaines. Brooke was in charge of territory of the United States west of the Mississippi River. He was responsible for forwarding reinforcements and supplies to the field armies of generals Zachary Taylor and Winfield Scott in Mexico and operated out of headquarters in New Orleans.

== Legacy ==
His great-grandson is George Mercer Brooke, Jr. (born to George Mercer Brooke II).

There is a George Mercer Brooke Chapter in the National Society Daughters of the American Revolution.
