= John Tayloe Corbin =

Virginian planter and politician

Richard Corbin

Member of the House of Burgesses for King and Queen County, Virginia
- In office 1769–1774 Serving with William Lyne, George Brooke
- Preceded by: Richard Tunstall
- Succeeded by: Christopher Robinson

Personal details
- Born: December 15, 1739 Laneville plantation, King and Queen County, Colony of Virginia
- Died: February 16, 1794 (aged 54) Laneville plantation, King and Queen County, Virginia
- Resting place: Christ Church cemetery, Middlesex County, Virginia
- Spouse: Maria Waller
- Children: at least 4 sons and 4 daughters including Richard Corbin and Gawin Lane Corbin
- Parent(s): Richard Corbin, Elizabeth (Betty) Tayloe
- Relatives: John Tayloe I (grandfather)
- Occupation: planter, politician

John Tayloe Corbin (December 15, 1739 – February 16, 1794) was a Virginia planter and politician who represented King and Queen County in the House of Burgesses. The son of powerful planter Richard Corbin, a member of the Governor's Council, he was likewise a Loyalist during the American Revolutionary War (during which two brothers served in British forces), but remained in Virginia. He was named after his maternal grandfather John Tayloe I.

== Early life and education ==
The eldest son of the former Elizabeth Tayloe, daughter of burgess John Tayloe I, and her planter husband Richard Corbin. He was descended from the First Families of Virginia and his father would rise to a seat on the Virginia Governor's Council during this boy's childhood. Corbin received an education appropriate to his class.

== Career ==
Corbin continued the family's planter and political traditions. In the Virginia tax census of 1787, he paid taxes on 30 enslaved adults and 54 teenage slaves, as well as 14 horses, 54 cattle and ten wheels (including 2 chariots and 1 chair) in King and Queen County. He also owned 28 adult slaves and 45 teenage slaves, thirteen horses and 99 cattle in Middlesex County which were not tithable.

King and Queen County voters first elected Corbin as one of their representatives in the House of Burgesses in 1769, and he won re-election until 1775. During that time his father continued as a member of the Virginia Governor's Council. In 1776 the Virginia Convention noted his loyalty to Britain, and he stopped his public activity, instead concentrating on his plantations.

== Personal life ==
In 1771, he married Mary Waller (1752-1796), daughter of burgess and judgeBenjamin Waller. They had sons Richard Corbin (1771-1819), John T. Corbin Jr. of Gales plantation in Middlesex County (1776-1799), Gawin Lane Corbin (1778-1821) and Henry Eltonhead Corbin of Gales plantation in Middlesex County (1794-1826) and daughters Elizabeth Tayloe Corbin (1780-1832; who married her cousin Richard Henry Corbin and then Elliott Muse), Martha Maria Corbin (b. 1784; who married John B. Whiting of Gloucester County), Ann Frances Corbin (1786-1811; who married Tayloe Braxton), and Henrietta Matilda Corbin (b. 1792; who married Madison Dillard).

== Death and legacy ==
John Tayloe Corbin died in 1794. His sons Major Richard Corbin of Laneville plantation and Gawin Lane Corbin of Kings Creek Plantation in York County would both distinguish themselves in the War of 1812 as well as serve in the Virginia House of Delegates representing various Tidewater counties. The Library of Virginia has his papers.
