= Gawin Lane Corbin =

Virginia politician

Gavin Lane Corbin

Member of the Virginia House of Delegates for York, Virginia
- In office December 3, 1810 – November 29, 1812 Serving with Samuel Shield
- Preceded by: William Tazewell
- Succeeded by: Robert Pescud
- In office December 5, 1808 – December 3, 1809 Serving with Peyton Southall
- Preceded by: William Tazewell
- Succeeded by: William Tazewell

Personal details
- Born: December 2, 1771 Laneville plantation, King and Queen County, Colony of Virginia
- Died: November 3, 1821 (aged 49) Kings Creek plantation, York County, Virginia
- Spouse: Maria Beverley Randolph
- Children: at least 2 sons and 2 daughters
- Parent(s): John Tayloe Corbin, Maria Waller
- Relatives: Richard Corbin (grandfather); Richard Corbin (brother); Gawin Corbin of Middlesex, Francis Corbin(uncles)
- Education: College of William and Mary
- Occupation: planter, officer, politician

Military service
- Branch/service: Virginia militia
- Rank: Major
- Battles/wars: War of 1812; Battle of Hampton

Gawin Lane Corbin (December 2, 1771 – June 10, 1819) was a Virginia planter, officer and politician who thrice represented York County in the Virginia House of Delegates and was severely wounded defending Hampton in the War of 1812.

== Early and family life ==
Born to the former Maria Waller, daughter of burgess and judge Benjamin Waller of Williamsburg, and her husband, John Tayloe Corbin (1739-1794), he was descended from the First Families of Virginia. His grandfather Richard Corbin had been a member of the Virginia Governor's Council before the American Revolutionary War, and died when this boy was a teenager. During his childhood, his father had been imprisoned for Loyalist activities, but posted a bond and agreed to stay on his Caroline County properties until the conflict ended, possibly because a nephew, Gawin Corbin of Yew Springs, had sided with the Revolutionary cause. Like his brother and cousins, this Richard Corbin received a private education appropriate to his class. He attended the College of William and Mary in Williamsburg.

== Career ==
Upon coming of age, he inherited Kings Creek Plantation in York County, which his father had purchased shortly before his own death. Enslaved labor operated the farm. In the 1810 census, Corbin owned 71 slaves.

York County voters three times elected him as one of their representatives in the Virginia House of Delegate.

During the War of 1812, Corbin was a major on the staff of Lt.Col. Burwell Bassett. He at least twice commanded the 68th Virginia regiment, charged with protecting Hampton near the York River's confluence into Chesapeake Bay and for whom the Hampton Roads area was named. Before March 1813, he directed a revenue cutter and pilot boat that captured British barges at Hampton Roads, but additional British ships arrived so conditions deteriorated by June so he mustered additional York County troops for Hampton's defense. On June 22, 1813, American forces successfully defended Craney Island, a fortress on an island in the York River across from Hampton, which was guarding the Elizabeth River, a tidal estuary leading to Norfolk and Portsmouth. About 1500 British troops and mercenaries failed to seize the island, saving Norfolk.

However, three days later, 2000 British troops and mercenaries sought revenge in a two-pronged attack on Hampton, guarded by fewer than 450 militiamen and two artillery batteries. Admiral Sir George Cockburn personally led one of the attacking columns, and Thomas Sydney Beckwith the other. Gawin Lane Corbin became one of the heroes of the battle, together with artillery Major Stapleton Crutchfield and Capt. Brazelton Pryor. Corbin was carted from the field after minie balls shattered his arm, as well as wounded his leg and killed his horse, and was initially thought dead, but recovered. The British captured the 68th Regiment's battle flag, and sacked Hampton for days. In Jan 1814, after Col. Walker's resignation and before Col. Bassett could return from Washington, Corbin assumed command and called three militia companies and the Williamsburg cavalry into service.

== Personal life ==
On August 12, 1800, Corbin married the former Maria Beverley Randolph, whose father was Robert Beverley of Blandfield plantation, and whose first husband had been Richard Randolph of Curles plantation. She already had a year-old son, Gavin, whom this man adopted. They had two sons, of whom Richard Randolph Corbin (1801-1853) would move to Mississippi, (where he died) and John Tayloe Corbin died as an infant. Their daughter Lucy Beverley Corbin (1804-1836) married Capt. John Goodall of James City County, and Anna Byrd Corbin (1808-1847) married Dr. William H. Shield of York County.

== Death and legacy ==
Corbin died at his Kings Creek plantation on November 3, 1821, and was probably buried there.
