= Cheatham Annex =

U.S. Military base

- Part of Navy Expeditionary Logistics Support Group
- York County, Virginia
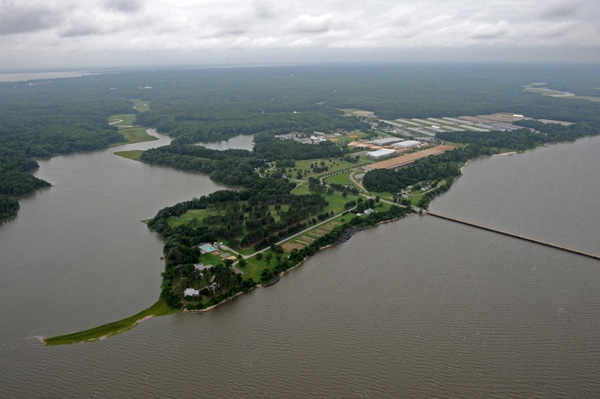
- Aerial photograph of Naval Weapons System Yorktown, Va and Cheatham Annex (June 17, 2009)

Site information
- Type: Military base

Location
- Cheatham Annex
- Coordinates: 37°17′8″N 76°36′24″W

Cheatham Annex (abbreviated CAX) is a Naval Base, located near Williamsburg, Virginia on the York River approximately 35 miles northwest of Norfolk in the heart of the famous Jamestown–Williamsburg–Yorktown "Historic Triangle." Although Cheatham Annex was not commissioned until June 1943, the land on which the base is located can claim the unique distinction of having been associated with every conflict involving the United States freedom and independence. The mission of Cheatham Annex includes supplying Atlantic Fleet ships and providing recreational opportunities to military and civilian personnel.

== Location ==
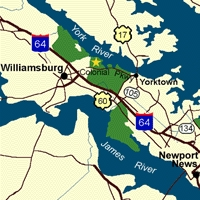
Cheatham is on the York River, in Virginia

Cheatham Annex facility is located outside of Williamsburg in York County, Virginia. The annex is adjacent to the York River, between Queen Creek and King Creek, approximately 15 miles upstream from the Chesapeake Bay. Located in York County, Virginia at latitude 37.284 and longitude -76.591. or Latitude: 37°17’2”N Longitude: 76°35’25”W. The average elevation is 26 feet 5 inches.

The eastern section of Cheatham Annex is a 1,579-acre federal facility bounded by the entrance of Queen Creek into the York River to the north, the York River to the east, ane King Creek to the south, the western boundaries are with Department of Interior (DOI) property. The former Virginia Fuel Farm is across the Colonial Parkway, southwest of this section of the annex. This former part of Cheatham Annex, 262 acres of contaminated soil, is being turned into a golf course.

The western section of Cheatham Annex is bounded to the north by the Colonial Parkway, and half of the eastern boundary is adjacent to the Virginia Fuel Farm. The remaining western, southern, and lower eastern boundary is adjacent to non-federal government land. There are several ponds on, or adjacent to the annex, including Penniman Lake, Youth Pond, Jones Pond, and Cheatham Pond. Overland drainage from the sources at the annex may flow into these ponds or the York River

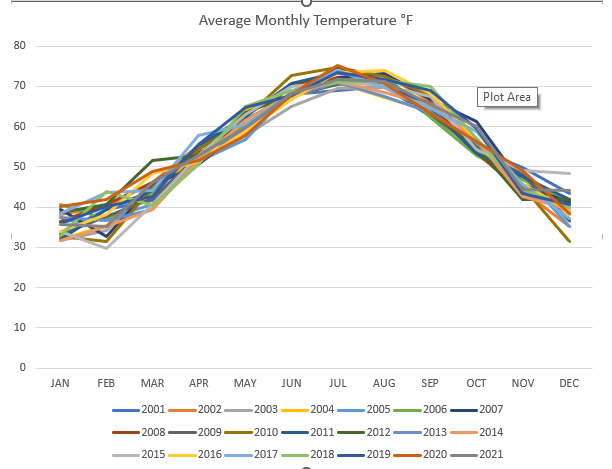
Temperatures - Cheatham Annex

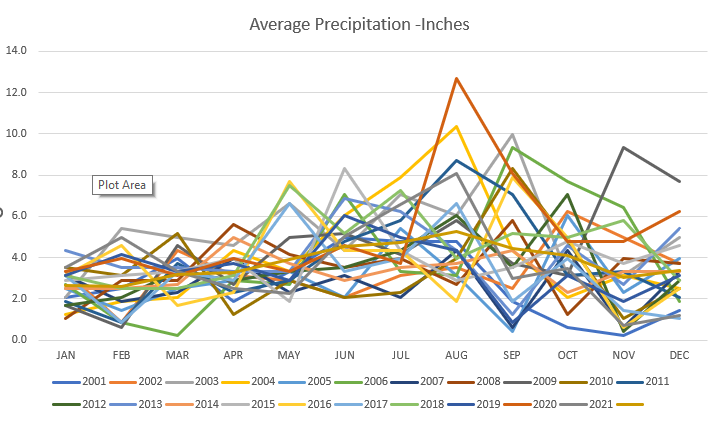
Precipitation - Cheatham Annex

The climate is moderate. Between 2001 and 2021, the average temperature was 55 °F. During the same period, the hottest month was July, averaging 74 °F, while January had the coldest average temperature at 35°F.

For 2001 to 2021, the average rainfall at Cheatham Annex was 45.2 inches per year. In that timeframe, August was the wettest month with an average of 5.3 inches, with the driest month over the same period was February, with 2.6 inches.

== History ==
=== Before 1630 ===
Positioned in the center of the Jamestown–Williamsburg–Yorktown "Historic Triangle," CAX was once the location of a native Indian village. Old maps and artifacts indicate an Indian village existed in the area of Penniman Spit, located on base. Historians believe that a Spanish Jesuit Mission occupied the area and was annihilated in an Indian massacre in 1572. Beginning in the 1700s colonial settlers gradually displaced the Indians. The initial settlement of Virginia was the task of the Virginia Company, a private English corporation. From the founding of Jamestown in 1607 to dissolution of the company in 1624, colonization activity was confined to the James River, and practically everyone in the Colony lived on the banks of this one river.

=== Utiemaria (1630-1640) ===
A census taken when the crown assumed administration of the fledgling Colony lists a total of 1,232 individuals alive in Virginia in January 1625. Included among the 1,232 were Ensign John Utie, his wife Anne, their son John, and three servants living on a plantation of 100 acres called Utopia, on the James River below Jamestown. John Utie is credited as being the first known fiddler on American soil.

In 1630, the Virginia Colony decided to settle the lands along the lower York River. On the south banks of the river, John West (governor) received 600 acres on the east side of Felgates creek (later known as Bellfield Plantation and the "E.D. Plantation"). At the same time, Captain John Utie was awarded 600 acres on the west side of King’s Creek. Captain Utie named his new plantation "Utiemaria" and lived there until he died in November 1638. His son John Utie acquired Utiemaria and possessed it until it was sold to Col William Tayloe (the immigrant) in 1640.

=== Kings Creek Plantation (1640-1830s) ===
William Tayloe (the immigrant) died in 1655. In 1656 or 1657 Col William Tayloe's widow, Elizabeth Kingsmill, married Colonel Nathaniel Bacon (This Colonel Bacon, who rose to the president of the Council of the State, was first cousin once removed of Nathaniel Bacon, Jr., who led Bacon's Rebellion.) Though they owned other property, Bacon and his wife used King's Creek Plantation (as it was then called) as their residence, although the deed was still held by the estate of the late William Tayloe. Another resident of King's Creek was Colonel Bacon's young niece, Abigail Smith. In 1672, Abigail Smith married Lewis Burwell II, a prosperous planter. On Nov 23, 1693 Col. William Tayloe (the nephew) of Richmond Co., VA, nephew and heir of Maj. William Tayloe (the immigrant), late of King's Creek in York Co., deceased, deeds to Lewis Burwell, 1200 acres between King's Creek and Queen's Creek on York River, formerly the property of Col. William Tayloe (the immigrant), the elder.

==== Burwell Family era (1697-1830s) ====
Kings Creek Plantation would be held by the Burwell family into the 1800s. On Lewis Burwell's death in 1710. King's Creek Plantation passed to his son Major James Burwell. James Burwell was one of the justices for York County and a burgess from 1715 to 1718. James Burwell's 1718 grave is located in a brick-walled cemetery adjacent to a tee on the modern day golf course.

In the 1780s Cornwallis' British troops and General Washington's Continental Army used a site on what is now Cheatham.

Owners of King's Creek Plantation:
Person	Dates	Notes
Captain John Utie	1630-1638	"Utiemaria"
John Utie	1638-1640	Inherited "Utiemaria"
Col. William Tayloe (the immigrant)	1640-1655	purchased from John Utie
Mrs. Elizabeth Kingsmill (Tayloe) (Bacon)	1655-1657	deed was held by estate of late Col. William Tayloe
Nathaniel Bacon (Virginia politician)	1657-March 16, 1692	married widow of late Col. William Tayloe, deed was held by Tayloe's estate. Died without children
Mrs. Abigail Smith (Burwell)	March 16, 1692 – Nov 23, 1693	niece and primary heir of Nathaniel Bacon. Had married Lewis Burwell around 1674. She died November 12, 1692, shortly after Bacon. Deed still held by Tayloe's estate.
Lewis Burwell, Jr.	Nov 23, 1693 – September 1696	acquired from estate of the late Col. William Tayloe
Lewis Burwell	September 1696 – December 1710	
James Burwell	December 1710 – October 1718	
Nathaniel Bacon Burwell	October 1718 – May 1746	
James Burwell	May 1746 – September 1775	
Nathaniel Burwell	September 1775 – April 1790	
John Tayloe Corbin	April 1790 – 1794	
Gawin Lane Corbin	1794-1821	
Dr. Richard Randolph Corbin	1821-183?	
?	183? - before 1914	
DuPont	before 1914-1926	
?	1926-1942	
U.S. Navy	1942-	

=== 1830s to 1916 ===
In April 1862 all of Yorktown, including this site, was caught under a thirty-day siege which included the largest concentration of artillery in one place at one time in history. This was during the Seven Days Battles or more correctly referred to as the Peninsula Campaign. This was the unsuccessful attempt by McClellan to capture the Confederate capital of Richmond and end the war.

=== Penniman, Virginia (1916 to 1942) ===
The area land was used primarily for farming until World War I when the E.I. DuPont Nemours Company built a large powder and shell-loading plant. The DuPont plant loaded explosives into large-caliber shell. Founded during the early 1900s the town was named Penniman, in honor of Russell S. Penniman, inventor of ammonia dynamite. Penniman, Virginia, eventually grew to a city of over 15,000 residents.

During World War I, prior to Navy ownership and activity, a portion of the current Navy property was the location of a large powder and shell-loading plant, the duPont de Nemours Company's U.S. Penniman shell-loading plant. The Penniman shell-loading plant operated under contract to the U.S. government loading shells from 1917 to 1918. The facility consisted of approximately 3,300 acres and included what is now the Cheatham Annex, the United States Department on the Interior National Park Service (National Colonial Park), and the Virginia Department of Emergency Services fuel farm (no longer active).

During this time the area included a city of 10,000 people and was named Penniman. The Penniman shell-loading plant, which was a large powder- and shell-loading facility operated during World War I. The Penniman facility closed in 1918. By May 1919, less than 100 people remained in the city of Penniman and by 1920 the land had reverted to farmland.

Following the end of World War I in 1918, through 1926, the U.S. government operated the Penniman General Ordnance Depot to prepare manufactured ordnance and explosives for long-term storage and shipment to permanent U.S. ordnance depots. At the same time, E.I. duPont de Nemours Engineering Company was decommissioning military ordnance and dismantling the former shell-loading plant and TNT plant structures. From 1926 to 1942, the land was in private ownership and was used for farming or left idle.

=== 1942 and WWII ===
With the outbreak of World War 2, the US government construction began on August 27, 1942 at Cheatham with the erection of a supply pier. The pier consisted of an approach, 2,850 feet long by 28 feet wide, with an L-head at the extreme outboard end, 1,215 feet long by 42 feet wide, parallel to the river channel.

Early in September, 1942, work began on the construction at Cheatham of 10 storehouses, an administration building, and all the appurtenant buildings and services needed to make the annex a secure and independent naval installation. The warehouses were of temporary construction, without heat or sprinklers, 120 feet by 828 feet, one-story, affording approximately 1,000,000 square feet of covered storage space.

This area of land located in the Jamestown, Williamsburg, Yorktown historical triangle was seized by the Navy on June 21, 1943. When commissioned and annexed to the Naval Supply Depot at Norfolk, the facility was renamed FISC Cheatham Annex in honor of RADM Joseph Johnston Cheatham, the 1929 Chief of the Bureau of Supplies and Accounts, the forerunner of today's Naval Supply Systems Command. He was also the fifth and eighth commanding officer of Naval Supply Depot Norfolk.

The first ten storehouses at Cheatham Annex were built in 1943. They were one-story cinder-block and timber-frame structures, 835 feet by 120 feet, with concrete ground-level floors. The second group of warehouses, built in 1945, were six storehouses, doubled the station's general storage capacity, by virtue of the buildings' 200-foot width on the 835-foot length. Steel-frame construction was used. The transit shed was of bolted-steel construction, 1,500 feet long by 240 feet wide.

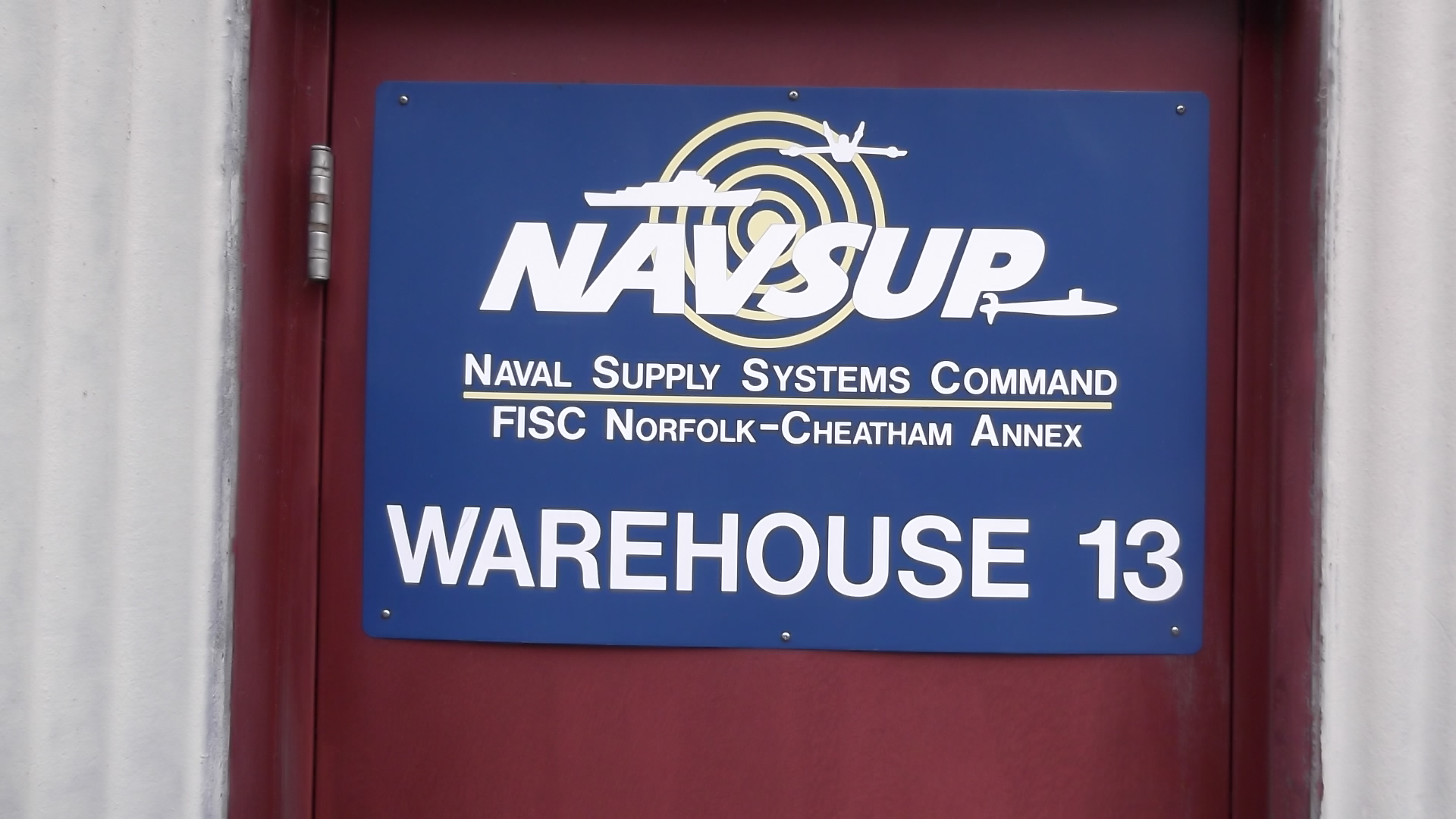
Door to Warehouse 13

The cold storage building, originally built 677 feet by 200 feet, was later extended to 877 feet in length. It had concrete foundations, brick and cinder-block walls, wood frame, and concrete floors at car-door height.

The Fleet Industrial Supply Center, Cheatham Annex, officially opened in 1943 as a storage depot, built on the site of a munitions plant. The 1,572-acre property included 7 archaeological sites, Colonial grave sites, DuPont Company buildings built in 1910, and several World War II buildings.

At inception, CAX occupied approximately 3,349 acres.

In March 1943, construction began of a sizable tank farm at Cheatham Annex, near the fuel depot at Yorktown. Fifteen tanks, of 50,000-barrel capacity each, were installed underground for the storage of fuel oil. Three more of these tanks were provided for diesel oil. A timber T-shaped fueling pier was constructed into the York River, with an approach 2,625 feet long and a head 910 feet long.

Several portions of the original base have since been declared surplus and transferred to other government jurisdictions, including the National Park Service, the Commonwealth of Virginia, and York County.

As a satellite unit of the Naval Supply Depot, Cheatham Annex provided bulk storage facilities and served as an assembly and overseas shipping point throughout World War II.

During World War II, from 1944 to 1945, 520 German and Italian prisoners of war were held at Cheatham Annex.

=== 21st century ===
CAX currently occupies 2,300 acres. CAX is divided into two parcels, with the larger parcel situated along the banks of the York River. Almost all of the activities at CAX (administration, training, maintenance, support, and housing) take place in this portion of the Installation. The smaller parcel is located south of the Colonial National Historic Parkway. This area contains Jones Pond and is used mainly as a watershed protection area. In July 1987, CAX was designated the Hampton Roads Navy Recreational Complex. Today, the mission of CAX includes supplying Atlantic Fleet ships and providing recreational opportunities to military and civilian personnel. As part of the Navy's Mid-Atlantic installation claimant consolidation, Cheatham Annex, formerly an annex of the Fleet Industrial Supply Center, Norfolk, was incorporated with the Yorktown Naval Weapons Station on October 1, 1998.

== Current status ==
The facility provides complete retail supply support services for approximately 40 tenant activities between Cheatham Annex, Williamsburg and Naval Weapons Station, Yorktown. Included as part of this support service is custody asset storage for large, bulky and unique Navy material and programs. At the 50th anniversary of the installation, in 1993, the base employed 128 civilians and housed 627 tenants from other military commands and 307 reservists.

Cheatham Annex has also been called the “Capital of Navy Expeditionary Logistics” as the U.S. Navy reserve command, Navy Expeditionary Logistics Support Group. There are eighteen warehouses, providing approximately 2.3 million square feet of unheated space and 300,000 square feet of controlled humidity space. The command's new headquarters and training building was designated as a 2009 Leadership in Energy and Environmental Design (LEED) Silver certified building. The 38,960 square foot building joins the command element, administrative, operations and training departments under one roof– providing significantly enhanced capabilities for garrison operations.

Expeditionary training for Navy logistics and cargo handlers, both active duty and reserve, is conducted at Cheatham Annex. These units have deployed multiple times to Iraq and Afghanistan in support of operations on both fronts. CAX is also homeport to USNS Zeus (T-ARC 7), for Military Sealift Command (MSC). Zeus is capable of laying 1,000 miles of cable at depths of up to 9,000 feet and is the only ship of her type currently operated by the U.S. Navy.

Cheatham Annex is headquarters and home for the Navy's “Combat Stevedores” the predominantly Reserve cargo handling command with one active duty battalion, and home away from home for 10 Reserve battalions, and four regiments.

The Navy Expeditionary Medical Support Command (NEMSCOM) is a tenant command on Cheatham Annex. Navy Expeditionary Medical Support Command is Navy Medicine's lead agent for the deployable medical systems. This was originally the Fleet Hospital Support Office, providing medical and surgical support to the needs of all sailors, marines, soldiers and airmen deployed. In 1997, the Chief of Naval Operations, as part of the Base Realignment Act, moved the FHSO from Naval Air Station, Alameda, CA to Cheatham, VA. In April 1998, the mammoth relocation process was successfully completed as more than 100 Naval Reserve men and women from Navy Cargo Handling Battalion 5, home-ported in Tacoma, Washington, offloaded hundreds of containers, civil engineering support equipment, and military vehicles to warehouses at Cheatham Annex.

For government usage, the outdoor range at Cheatham Annex (CAX) is capable of handling all pistols, shotguns and rifles up to and including 7.62 mm. The surface danger zone (SDZ) of the outdoor range extends over portions of the York River. Utilization of the range may be affected at times due to the transit of boats through the SDZ. An increase of boat traffic occurs mainly during the summer months and through the commercial fishing season.

Since October 18, 2002, Cheatham Annex purchases its drinking water from the Newport News Waterworks, operated by the City of Newport News.

In 2009, Cheatham Annex was named “Tree City USA” community. The Arbor Day Foundation recognized the facility for its community forestry.

== On base recreation ==
MWR brochure, circa 2010

The Navy Morale Welfare and Recreation (NMWR) runs a cabin and recreation facility on Cheatham Annex. Cheatham Annex (CAX).

CAX is home to the largest Morale, Welfare and Recreation (MWR) Outdoor Recreation facility on the East Coast. Active duty, Reservists and military retirees and their dependents can take advantage of a wide range of facilities, including 54 cabins, 50 RV parking spots, 20 primitive campsites and more than 10 miles of hiking and mountain biking trails. Along with fishing on two lakes and the York River, swimming pool and an 18-hole golf course, the MWR Outdoor Recreation is ideal for military families looking for a chance to relax.

== Ecological footprint ==
=== Endangered animals ===
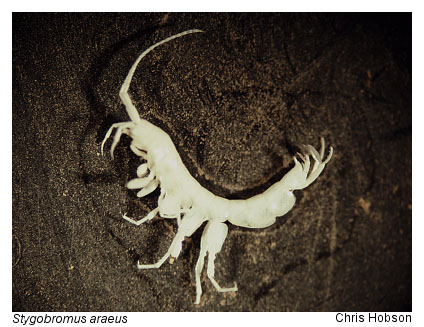
Stygobromus araeus

The globally rare interstitial amphipod, Stygobromus araeus, is closely associated with the groundwater in shell marl or limestone deposits. Identified in 1969 by Dr. John R. Holsinger, the 2002 DoD report on Species at Risk on DoD Installation describes this animal as 'A small, unpigmented, blind amphipod. The species is sexually dimorphic, with males ranging up to 0.70 cm in length, and females to 0.55 cm.' This extremely rare species is only found on the coast of southeastern Virginia.

=== Environmental sites ===
There are several sites designated on the Cheatham Annex grounds that illustrate the legacy and usage of the site over the years. The overhead view of the facility shows the sites either clustered around naval storage areas or abandoned manufacturing sites.

==== Sites designated as "No Further Action (NFA)" sites ====
- Site 1 was used for burn residues between 1942 and 1951, and as a general landfill between 1951 and 1981. Site 1 covers approximately 2 acres and is located along the York River and behind a former incinerator that was dismantled sometime between 1989 and 1992. From 1942 to 1951 the landfill was used as a disposal area for burn residues and from 1951 to 1972 as a general landfill. A variety of wastes, including empty paint cans and paint thinner cans, cartons of ether and other unspecified drugs, railroad ties, tar paper, sawdust, rags, concrete, and lumber, were burned and disposed in the landfill until 1981. After this time, the landfill was no longer used. An estimated 15,500 tons of solid waste were buried at the landfill (this is a very crude estimate). The landfill occupies an area of approximately 1.3 acres, including a large metal debris pile. It took the Navy 10 years to clean it up. That includes five separate "removal actions" from 2000 to 2007. In all, 28,000 cubic yards of material had to be hauled away.
- Site 2 was a 50-foot-diameter and 12- to 15-foot-deep food disposal pit. Based on the inert nature of the materials that were reportedly buried at Site 2, the site is not considered to be a significant source of contamination. No further action site.
- Site 3 was a storage area for 55 gallon drums of submarine dye waste. The dye was stored in 55-gallon drums on two or three pallets located between the warehouses. The drums corroded and dye leaked onto the ground and into the storm sewer system. During rain events, puddles containing a green fluorescein dye were observed. At times, the dye would leak into the storm sewer leading to the York River, turning the river green. The drums were subsequently removed in the early 1970s. No further action site.
- Site 5 was a borrow pit used as a disposal area for photographic chemicals. Outdated photographic chemicals (developers and fixers) were reportedly disposed in a pit, which was of unknown dimensions, in 1967 or 1968. Quantities mentioned included “20 to 40 gallons; or one pallet full, which was approximately six months’ accumulation.” This site was originally a “marl pit” located behind (southeast) of the old DuPont munitions factory area, near Second Street. No further action site.
- Site 6 is located to the west of the old DuPont ammunition factory. Reportedly, approximately 750 cubic yards of food spoiled in cold storage was buried in a 12 to 15 foot deep pit around 1970. Disposal was not ongoing, and the spoiled food had no hazardous properties. Based on the inert nature of the materials that were reportedly buried at Site 6, the site is not expected to be a significant source of contamination.
- Site 8 was a landfill is located approximately 300 feet north of Building CAD 14 and is estimated to be less than 1/4 acre in size. The disposal area reportedly consisted of a series of trenches with typical surface areas of 2,000 feet and depths of 10 feet. The site was used at various times since the early 1940s. The site was most active prior to the opening of the Landfill near the Incinerator (Site 1). It was reported that the site was used for waste disposal as recently as 1980. Specific information documenting disposal practices is not available. Reportedly, only nonhazardous materials such as spoiled meat, spoiled candy, and clothing have been disposed at the site.
- Site 10 is located south of First Street in the southernmost part of the old DuPont munitions plant. An estimated 75 to 100 gallons of decontamination agent (DS-2) was reportedly buried at the site. DS-2, which is toxic to humans and corrosive to metals, is used for decontaminating equipment contaminated with nerve or blister agents. DS-2 is 70% diethylene triamine; 28% ethylene glycol monomethyl ether; and 2% sodium hydroxide. It is not known if the DS-2 was neutralized prior to disposal. A magnetometer survey of Site 10 was performed in December 1985. The map shows the anomalous areas in terms of equivalent pounds of iron. While the source of the anomalies may indeed be buried metal, brick, slag, ash, or other disturbances the buried drums could also be the source of the anomalies. The mounds of soil present in the wooded area appeared to contain little iron.
- Site 12 was a scrap metal disposal site near water tower located approximately 2000 feet west of Jones Pond. The site was used for surface disposal of scrap metal; primarily old automobile parts and iron pipe. Based on visual inspection of the site approximately 10 to 110 cubic feet of material was disposed at the site.

==== Active sites ====
The following are considered sites requiring active environmental actions.

- Site 4 In the late 1960s, out-of-date, unused, medical supplies, including syringes and empty intravenous bottles, and one-inch metal banding, were unloaded down a bank in this area and covered with soil. Site 4 is a ravine located at the headwaters of an upstream pond and between buildings CAD 11 and CAD 12. It was reported that as much as 7,000 cubic yards of material was disposed at this site. Previously (date unknown), a considerable volume of these materials were reportedly removed from the site because syringe needles were getting stuck in deer hooves. After heavy rains, what appeared to be syringes could sometimes be seen floating in the adjacent pond and in Youth Pond (both upstream and downstream of D Street.) Observations in IAS field notes show that it is possible dyes were disposed of at the site. The location, volume or types of dyes are not known.
- Site 7: During the early 1900s, it was reported that non-hazardous and/or inert wastes from the City Penniman and the DuPont Company Penniman facility were disposed along the York River. The wastes were reported to be non-hazardous and/or inert. However, specific information documenting the types and quantities of wastes was not available. The surface of the site was described as level and supporting a variety of grasses. No evidence of stressed vegetation was noted during the IAS. The western, northern, and eastern boundaries of the site are clearly defined by steep banks rising an estimated 10 to 20 feet in elevation. In November 1999 a Virginia Department of Environment Field Investigation was conducted at Site 7 to verify the presence of a debris disposal area. One sediment sample was collected from the low-lying area to the east of the bermed area. Ten test pits were excavated to confirm the presence of buried debris. The test pit investigation revealed that debris is buried in the northern portion of the site. Aroclor-1260, a PCB pollutant, was detected in the sediment sample. Site 7 is located along the York River, east of Chase Road and Davis Road transects the site.
- Site 9 is approximately 7,000 square feet in size and located adjacent to the northwest corner of Building CAD 16. Between 1973 and 1980, electrical transformers, some of which contained PCBs, were reportedly stored at the site. These transformers were awaiting repair or disposal. Between six and thirty transformers were stored at the site at a time. The storage area surface was exposed soil enclosed by an earthen containment wall. Information regarding the number of leaking transformers, the volume of PCB oil stored or spilled is not known. Transformers were no longer stored at the site after 1980 and the area was graded and covered with gravel.. The storage area was not paved; however, it was enclosed by an earthen wall.
- Site 11: Between 1940 and 1978, Site 11 was used to store containers of waste-oil, tar, asphalt, and other scrap materials. It is approximately 2.7 acre area located 250 feet south of Antrim Road and the Public Works facility. South of the entrance, barrels containing petroleum products were discovered, as well as 500-gallon square tanks containing asphalt or oil used in making asphalt. The Bone Yard — formally known as Site 11 — cost about $2 million to clean up. The 2.7 acre-tract was used between 1940 and 1978 to store various construction materials including waste oil, tar and asphalt. The Navy hauled out nearly 4,440 tons of contaminated soil, debris and concrete along with dozens of 55-gallon drums containing petroleum products and non-hazardous liquids. The record of decision was signed in August. Because the materials were above ground, there was never a danger of toxic materials leaking into the groundwater and getting off site.

==== Areas of concern ====
- AOC 1 is a former debris disposal area located just west of Chapman Road within two ravines associated with unnamed tributaries to Jones Mill Pond. Wood and metal debris outcrop from the banks of the ravines, with debris being more extensive within the southern ravine. There is orange staining in the unnamed tributary that receives runoff from the southern ravine. This discoloration may be a result of natural oxidation processes and is not necessarily indicative of site contamination.
- AOC 2 was discovered during site visits performed by LANTDIV, USEPA, VDEQ, and Baker in late 1997 and early 1998. The area is situated in woods, north of Garrison Road, along the southern perimeter of CAX. The area contains several rows of concrete foundation piers which at one time apparently supported a shipping house associated with the former Penniman shell-loading plant. The majority of the structures associated with the Penniman facility was demolished somewhere between 1918 and 1925. There is no evidence of the structure other than the foundation piers. However, grass-covered lanes that lead to the area are likely locations of former rail lines that have been removed. Several glass bottles (many of that are labeled dextrose) were present both upon the ground surface and partially buried. In addition, several partially buried drums (apparently empty) were also noted. Mounds of soil that are present may also be indicative of buried materials. One buried drum (which can be seen through a void in the ground) is present to the east of the abandoned foundation. It is suspected that additional buried drums may be located in this area.
- AOC 3 – CAD 11/12 pond bank: AOC 3 consists of an approximately 20 foot by 20 foot by 10 foot high pile of metal banding along the north bank of the unnamed pond, north of D Street. The pond is situated between Buildings 11 and 12. This area, which also contains a few empty drums, is adjacent to Site 4.
- AOC 6 consists of five sub-areas related to the former Penniman shell-loading plant. The Penniman shell-loading plant was an explosives manufacturing facility operated by the DuPont de Nemours Company during World War I on what is now CAX and adjacent properties. The five AOC 6 sub-areas were identified through aerial photographic analysis as follows:
1. Ammonia settling pits – This area consists of earthen ammonia settling pits that were part of a former shell-loading area located on Cheatham Annex. Wastewater from an ammonia finishing building was discharged through these settling pits.
2. TNT-graining house sump – These areas consists of a concrete-lined, open-top pit believed to be the sump pit for the trinitrotoluene (TNT) graining house in the former shell-loading area. Located near the dam at Penniman Lake.
3. TNT catch box ruins – The catch box ruins area consists of an earthen, brick-lined depression located immediately adjacent to the TNT-graining house in the former shell-loading area. This area was used to separate TNT particles from wastewater. Located near the dam at Penniman Lake.
4. Waste slag material – This area consists of waste metallic slag material that is located throughout the shell-loading area predominantly along the railroad tracks.
5. 1918 drum storage – This area was used for the storage of 55-gallon drums when the shell-loading area was active. The site is currently a yard area around facility buildings.
- AOC 7 consists of several small surface debris disposal areas containing a few 55 gallon drums and cans. One of the areas of note is a pit approximately 30 feet by 20 feet and 8 feet deep that contained 40–50 10-gallon rusted cans with labeling containing the word “tetrachloroethene.” AOC 7 is located north of Building 14 and Site 8.
- AOC 8 is a very small area along the perimeter of the York River, buried debris (pipe, metal, and wood) can be seen cropping out from the edge of the slope and along the beach. Test pits conducted in 1999 indicate that the waste post-dates World War I and does not appear to be associated with DuPont Penniman facility waste disposal.
- AOC 9: Penniman Lake is 48-acre surface water body located in the southeastern portion of CAX that was created in 1943 when a portion of King Creek was dammed.

== Recent news ==
The senior enlisted chief at Cheatham Annex, Command Master Chief Richard Ward, was relieved by the Expeditionary Support Group Command in February, 2012. CMC Ward committed fraternization, willfully disobeyed a commissioned officer, misused a government cell phone, and made a false official statement.

The command master chief of Navy Cargo Handling Battalion (NCHB) 4 was relieved of duty March 14, 2012 by the commodore of 2nd Navy Expeditionary Logistics Regiment (NELR), at Cheatham Annex, VA. Capt. Charles Rink relieved Master Chief Logistics Specialist Scott Splitgerber, U.S. Navy Reserve, due to misconduct he committed while assigned as the command master chief of NCHB 4.

Marines and sailors of 2nd Marine Logistics Group participated in a large-scale training operation designed to prepare the nation's amphibious – logistics warfighters for an actual humanitarian aid and disaster relief operation, spanning the East Coast from Camp Lejeune, NC to Norfolk, Va., June 11–16, 2012. Elements of the Navy Expeditionary Logistics Support Group based at Naval Weapons Station Yorktown – Cheatham Annex, Williamsburg, Va., teamed with 2nd MLG's Combat Logistics Regiment 27, Combat Logistics Battalion 8, and CLB-6 to provide support for the Expeditionary Logistics Wargame.

A new Navy Ordnance Cargo Logistics Training Complex was completed in September 2013. The training facility consists of two buildings, with a 600-square-foot chemical test chamber and a new mock pier, warehouse and cargo hold for training with luffing cranes
