= William N. Pendleton =

American teacher, Episcopal priest, and Confederate soldier (1809-1883)

William Nelson Pendleton
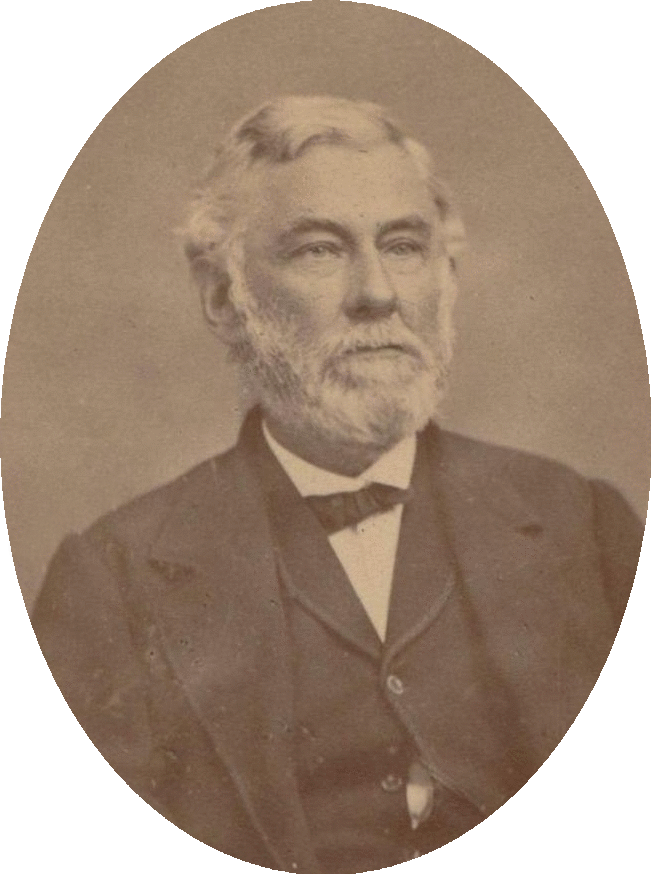
- William Nelson Pendleton
- Born: December 26, 1809; Richmond, Virginia, US
- Died: January 15, 1883 (aged 73); Lexington, Virginia, US
- Burial place: Oak Grove Cemetery; Lexington, Virginia
- Relatives: Lieutenant Colonel Alexander Pendleton
- Military career
- Allegiance: United States; Confederate States of America
- Branch: United States Army; Confederate States Army
- Service years: 1830–1833 (USA); 1861–1865 (CSA)
- Rank: Second Lieutenant (USA); Brigadier General (CSA)
- Nickname: "Parson" Pendleton
- Commands: 1st Rockbridge Artillery
- Conflicts: American Civil War: Battle of Hoke's Run; First Battle of Bull Run (WIA); Maryland Campaign; Battle of Shepherdstown
- Other work: Episcopal priest

William Nelson Pendleton (December 26, 1809 – January 15, 1883) was an American teacher, Episcopal priest, and Confederate soldier. He served as a Confederate general during the American Civil War, noted for his position as Gen. Robert E. Lee's chief of artillery for most of the conflict. After the war, Pendleton returned to his priestly duties and also wrote religious materials. He was also one of the initiators of the Myth of the Lost Cause of the Confederacy.

Camp Pendleton in Virginia Beach, Virginia, was named in his honor. As of March 2023 this Commonwealth of Virginia state facility is referred to as the "State Military Reservation".

== Early life and education ==
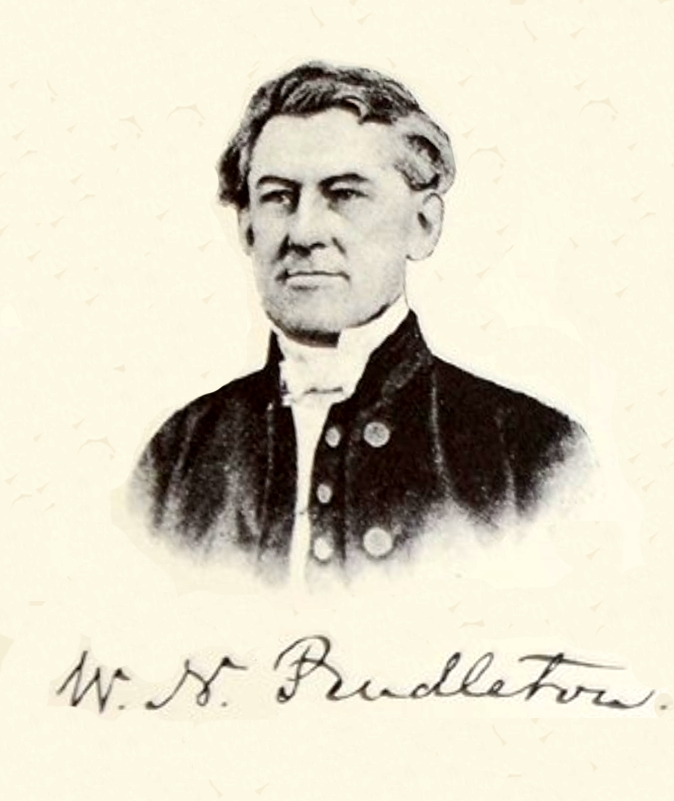
William Pendleton, D.D., Rector of Latimer Parish, Lexington, Virginia

William Nelson Pendleton was born in 1809 near Richmond, Virginia. He grew up on the Caroline County plantation belonging to his parents, Edmund Pendleton Jr., grandnephew and adopted son of Edmund Pendleton who established the plantation, and his wife Lucy (Nelson) Pendleton. Private tutors taught young William, who also attended John Nelson's School. Pendleton's family arranged for his older brother (Francis Walker Pendleton) to enter the United States Military Academy at West Point, but when Francis expressed little military interest, William went instead. He entered West Point in 1826 and graduated four years later, standing 5th out of 42 cadets.

Among Pendleton's contemporaries at West Point were future Confederate generals Joseph E. Johnston, Robert E. Lee, and John B. Magruder (with whom he was roommates), as well as future Confederate president Jefferson Davis. Appointed a brevet second lieutenant in the United States Army on graduating (July 1, 1830), Pendleton was assigned to the 2nd U.S. Artillery as a full second lieutenant. His regiment was ordered to Fort Moultrie to defend the harbor in Charleston, South Carolina, but that fall Pendleton fell sick with malaria and was reassigned to the arsenal in Augusta, Georgia to restore his health.

Pendleton returned to West Point in 1831 to teach mathematics, and on October 27, 1832, he was transferred to the 4th U.S. Artillery. He resigned his U.S. Army commission a year later on October 31, 1833, reportedly due to the issue of nullification in his home state. In 1833 Pendleton joined the faculty at Bristol College in Bucks County, Pennsylvania, and taught mathematics. In 1837 he began serving in the same capacity at Newark College in Delaware.

== Minister and teacher ==
In 1838, Pendleton was ordained an Episcopal priest by Bishop William Meade of Virginia. In 1839, he was appointed the first principal at the Episcopal High School in Alexandria, Virginia. The school grew quickly, but faced financial troubles and Pendleton resigned three years later.

He relocated to Baltimore, Maryland to serve as a priest in two parishes; he also served as rector of All Saints' Church in Easton, Maryland. In 1847 Pendleton moved to Frederick, Maryland to become rector of All Saints Church. In 1853, he returned to Virginia and became rector of Grace Episcopal Church in Lexington, where he remained as the American Civil War began.

== Civil War service ==
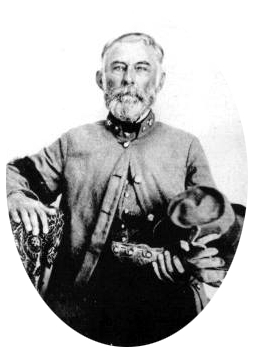
William Pendleton in the Civil War

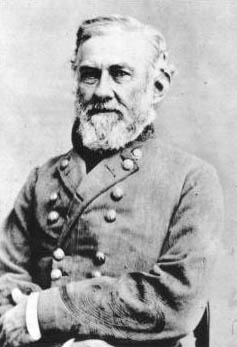
William Pendleton in his UCV frock coat

When the American Civil War commenced in 1861, Pendleton chose to follow the Confederate cause. On March 16 he entered the Regular Confederate Artillery with the rank of captain, and on May 1 he was elected captain in the Virginia Artillery. He commanded a four-gun battery called the Rockbridge Artillery, initially armed with training guns from the Virginia Military Institute. He named his guns "Matthew, Mark, Luke, & John" after the Gospel writers. On July 2 Pendleton participated in the minor Battle of Falling Waters, where "he and his battery performed capably." On July 13 Pendleton was promoted to colonel and began serving as chief of artillery for Brig. Gen. Joseph E. Johnston's command during the First Battle of Bull Run on July 21. He was wounded in this fight, injured in an ear and his back.

Beginning in July 1861, Pendleton led the artillery of the Confederate Army of the Potomac, and on March 14, 1862, he continued in this role after the army was renamed the Army of Northern Virginia. On March 26 he was promoted to brigadier general.

After Robert E. Lee took over command of the army in June 1862, he attempted to remove Pendleton as chief of artillery. However, Pendleton was a personal friend of Jefferson Davis, which ensured the security of his position.

On July 3, Pendleton was again wounded when a mule from his artillery kicked him in the leg and possibly breaking one of his bones there.

His most noted Civil War performance occurred during the 1862 Maryland Campaign. On the evening of September 19, Lee gave Pendleton command of the rearguard infantry following the Battle of Shepherdstown, ordering him to hold the Potomac River crossings until the morning. Despite a commanding position from which to defend the fords, "Pendleton lost track of his forces and lost control of the situation." Awakening Lee after midnight, he frantically reported his position lost and all of his guns captured.

This turned out to be a highly exaggerated and hasty account, as he lost only four guns, but he had pulled out the infantry "without sufficient cause." At least one military court of inquiry was held to investigate Pendleton's actions at Shepherdstown. Richmond newspapers viciously reported on this incident for the remainder of the war, and unflattering rumors and jokes were spread by his own soldiers and throughout the army. Pendleton was not particularly well-liked by the enlisted men, and it was said that "while the soldiers would gladly cheer most higher officers, they remained silent when Pendleton rode past them."

Pendleton served with the Army of Northern Virginia for the rest of the conflict, taking part in the 1863 and 1864 major campaigns of the Eastern Theater. When fellow "fighting bishop" Leonidas Polk was killed during the Atlanta campaign in June 1864, Jefferson Davis proposed assigning Pendleton to command of his corps in the Army of Tennessee, but Robert E. Lee convinced Davis that he was unsuited for the job. During the final two years of the war, Pendleton's role was mostly administrative, and his active command was only of the reserve ordnance. Throughout the war, he continued in his religious practices, always preaching to his men. Pendleton surrendered with Lee's army at Appomattox Court House on April 9, 1865, and was paroled from there and returned home.

== Postbellum career and death ==
Pendleton in later life

After the war, Pendleton returned to Lexington, Virginia, and his rectorship of Grace Church, which he would hold for the rest of his life. There in Lexington he retained a strong friendship with Matthew Fontaine Maury, Francis Henney Smith, and Robert E. Lee, and played a significant role in persuading his former commander to move to Lexington himself to take up the presidency of the institution that was to become Washington and Lee University. Lee, in turn, became one of Pendleton's parishioners, and Lee's last public transaction in 1870 was at a Grace Church vestry meeting in which Lee led a group of church leaders in a mutual pledge to increase Pendleton's salary. Rev. Pendleton conducted Lee's funeral in October 1870.

It was in Lexington on January 17, 1873, during a memorial to the departed Robert E. Lee, that Pendleton first blamed James Longstreet for Lee's defeat at the Battle of Gettysburg. Departing entirely from his own previous statements, including his Official Report written just days after the battle, he claimed that General Lee had ordered Longstreet to attack the Union right at "sunrise" on July 2, 1863. The attack was not begun until about 4:00 p. m., and Pendleton falsely claimed that Longstreet disobeyed Lee's orders and that the supposed delay was solely responsible for loss of the battle, which became a mainstay of the Lost Cause.

Pendleton remained in Lexington until his death in 1883, tirelessly promoting the Lost Cause and the reputation of Robert E. Lee. He traveled throughout the South raising money to build the Grace Episcopal Church in Lexington, and is buried next to his son at Oak Grove Cemetery. The first service in the new, completed church building was Rev. Pendleton's funeral.

== Family and genealogy ==
On July 15, 1831, Pendleton married Anzolette Elizabeth Page, and they had four children. His only son, Alexander Swift "Sandie" Pendleton, also served the Confederacy as an aide to Stonewall Jackson and was mortally wounded during the retreat that directly followed the Battle of Fishers Hill on September 20, 1864. His daughter Susan married future Confederate general Edwin G. Lee on November 16, 1856.

== In popular culture ==
Pendleton was portrayed in the 2003 Civil War film Gods and Generals by John Castle. The scene featured a conversation between Pendleton and Stonewall Jackson regarding his son, Sandie Pendleton, who was present. During the scene, Pendleton informed Jackson of the naming the howitzers Matthew, Mark, Luke, and John; to which, Jackson replied "I'm sure your men will spread the gospel wherever they encounter the enemy."

== See also ==
- List of American Civil War generals (Confederate)
