= Rappahannock Academy & Military Institute =

Rappahannock Academy was a military academy founded in 1813 in Caroline County, Virginia. Located on a hill near the Rappahannock River, the site was deemed well situated and brick buildings were constructed. The school's name was changed to Rappahannock Academy and Military Institute (RA&MI) in 1847.

It was preceded by the historic Mount Church (built circa 1750) that was given by the state of Virginia to the school.

William Mahone taught at RA&MI from January 1848 until July 1849. Subjects taught at the school included military science and uniform requirements. The American Civil War disrupted the school's program and drew most of its students into service.

Charles A. Lewis headed the school twice.

The school and its property were sold off in 1873.

== Alumni ==
- R. L. T. Beale
