= 1st Rockbridge Artillery =

Confederate States Army unit

- Flag of Virginia
- Active: 29 April 1861–9 April 1865
- Country: Confederate States of America
- Branch: Confederate States Army
- Type: Artillery
- Size: Battery of four field guns
- Nicknames: Pendelton's Battery, McLaughlin's Battery, Poague's Battery, Graham's Battery
- Engagements: American Civil War: First Battle of Manassas; First Battle of Kernstown; Battle of Port Republic; Battle of Malvern Hill; Battle of Antietam; Battle of Fredericksburg; Battle of Chancellorsville; Battle of Gettysburg; Battle of Spotsylvania Court House; Siege of Petersburg; Battle of Appomattox Court House

Commanders
- Notable commanders: William N. Pendleton; William T. Poague

The 1st Rockbridge Artillery was a light artillery battery in the Confederate States Army during the American Civil War.

The 1st Rockbridge Artillery were organized as part of the Stonewall Brigade in late April 1861 in Lexington, Virginia, from men of Rockbridge County. The battery fought at the First Battle of Manassas, supporting the brigade in its defense of Henry House Hill on 21 July. The battery provided artillery support for the brigade in the First Battle of Kernstown, the Battle of Port Republic, the Battle of Malvern Hill, the Second Battle of Manassas, and the Battle of Antietam. In October 1862 the 1st Rockbridge Artillery was detached from the brigade, and from that point in the war would be part of corps artillery battalions. The battery fought in the Battle of Fredericksburg, the Battle of Chancellorsville, the Battle of Gettysburg, the Battle of Spotsylvania Court House, and the Siege of Petersburg. After the Confederate abandonment of Petersburg, the 1st Rockbridge Artillery joined in the retreat and surrendered at Appomattox Court House on 9 April 1865.

== History ==
=== Formation ===
The seventy men of the 1st Rockbridge Artillery were organized in April 1861 by VMI professor John McCausland. William N. Pendleton took command of the battery in late April after McCausland was transferred to command another unit. The battery was initially equipped with two 6-pounders from VMI and two guns from Richmond. Pendleton named the first four guns "Matthew", "Mark", "Luke", and "John", after the Apostles. On 11 May, the battery departed for Harpers Ferry, where it joined Thomas J. Jackson's Virginia brigade, which was later called the Stonewall Brigade.

=== First Manassas ===
On 18 July, the battery moved east with the Stonewall Brigade to link up with Confederate general P. G. T. Beauregard's troops at Manassas Junction. On 21 July, during the First Battle of Manassas, Pendleton's Battery was among the Confederate batteries defending the key position of the battle, Henry House Hill. The battery was visited by Confederate president Jefferson Davis, who had gone to Manassas to watch the battle, during the Union retreat. In the aftermath of the battle, the battery received captured Union cannon.

== See also ==
- List of Virginia Civil War units
