= Rappahannock Academy, Virginia =

Unincorporated community in Virginia, US

- Unincorporated community
- Location within Virginia Location within the United States
- Coordinates: 38°10′53″N 77°16′35″W
- Country: United States
- State: Virginia
- County: Caroline
- Elevation: 200 ft (61 m)
- Time zone: UTC-5 (Eastern (EST))
  - Summer (DST): UTC-4 (EDT)
- ZIP code: 22538
- Area code: 804
- GNIS feature ID: 1472978

Rappahannock Academy is an unincorporated community in Caroline County, Virginia, United States. Rappahannock Academy is located on U.S. Route 17, 13 miles (21 km) southeast of Fredericksburg. Rappahannock Academy has a post office. The community was named after the Rappahannock Academy & Military Institute, a now-defunct military academy in the community.

Moss Neck Manor was listed on the National Register of Historic Places in 1999.
