= Rappahannock River =

River in Virginia, United States

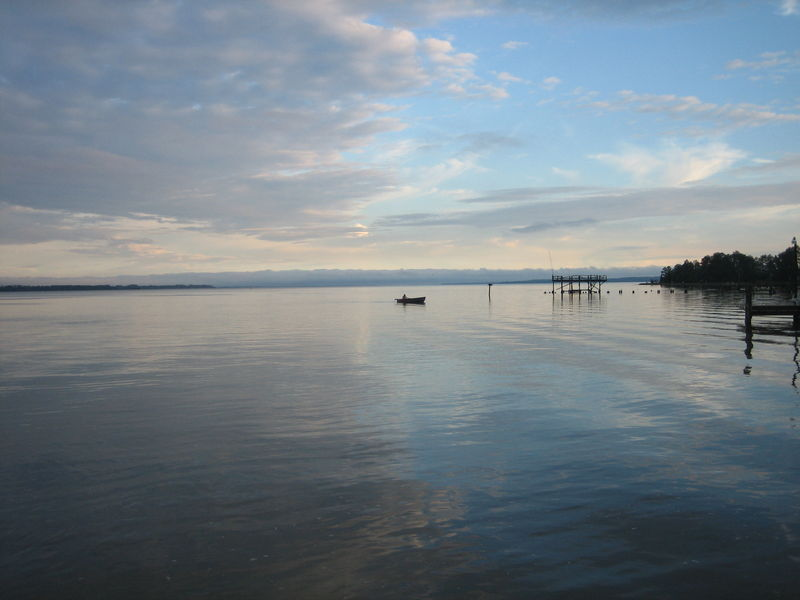
- The Rappahannock River at sunset in October 2005

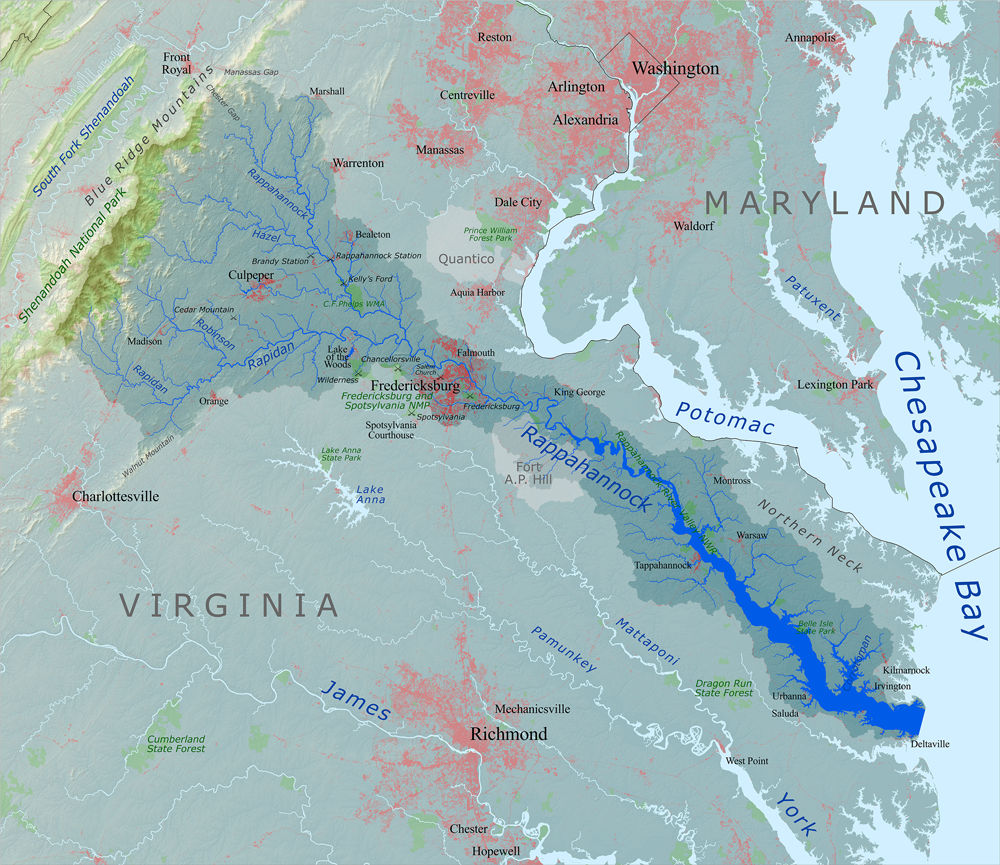
- Rappahannock River drainage basin

Location
- Country: United States
- State: Virginia
- Counties: Lancaster, Middlesex, Essex, Richmond, Westmoreland, King George, Caroline, Stafford, Spotsylvania, Culpeper, Fauquier, Rappahannock
- City: Fredericksburg

Physical characteristics
- Source
  - location: Chester Gap
  - elevation: 1,720 feet (520 m)
- Mouth
  - location: Chesapeake Bay
  - coordinates: 37°35′15″N 76°17′21″W
- Length: 195 miles (314 km)
- Basin size: 2,848 sq mi (7,380 km^{2})
- Discharge
  - average: 1,670 cubic feet per second (47 m^{3}/s)

The Rappahannock River is a river in eastern Virginia, in the United States, approximately 195 miles (314 km) in length. It traverses the entire northern part of the state, from the Blue Ridge Mountains in the west where it rises, across the Piedmont to the Fall Line, and onward through the coastal plain to flow into the Chesapeake Bay, south of the Potomac River.

An important river in American history, the Rappahannock was long an area of occupation by indigenous peoples, including the Rappahannock Tribe. Similarly, during the colonial era, early settlements in the Virginia Colony were formed along the river.

During the American Civil War, due to the river's acting as a barrier to north–south troop movements, it effectively functioned as the boundary of the eastern theater of the war, between the "North" (the Union) and the "South" (the Confederate States of America). It was at the center of a major theater of battle where tens of thousands of troops fought against each other. In this period some 10,000 enslaved African Americans escaped to freedom across the river to Union lines, after the first Battle of Fredericksburg.

The river drains an area of 2,848 square miles (7,380 km^{2}), approximately 6% of Virginia. Much of the watershed is rural and forested. Development in the area has increased since the late 20th century with the southward expansion of the metropolitan Washington, D.C. suburbs.

== Course ==
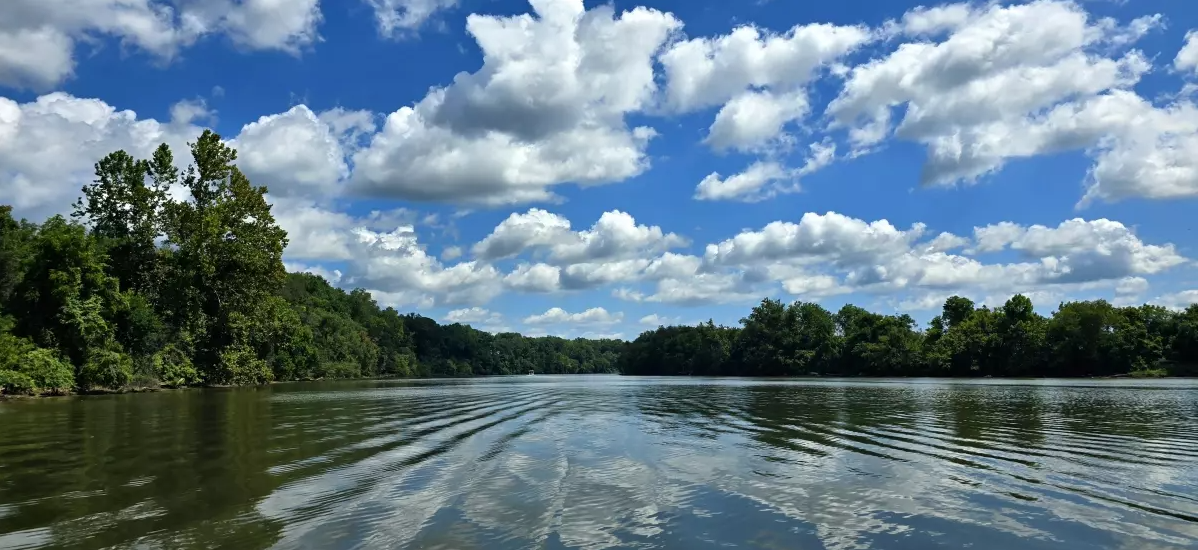
The Rappahannock River on August 19, 2024.

The Rappahannock River rises at Chester Gap, a wind gap in the Blue Ridge Mountains a few miles southeast of Front Royal, Virginia, near the single point where Warren, Fauquier, and Rappahannock counties come together. (Source Coordinates 38°49'40.1"N 78°06'08.8"W.) It flows southeastward, past Remington, Kelly's Ford, and Richardsville, before it is joined from the right by the Rapidan River, its largest tributary. The Rappahannock passes through the city of Fredericksburg.

Southeast of Fredericksburg, the river begins to slow and widens into a brackish tidal estuary approximately 50 miles (80 km) long. It passes two small, important historic, river towns, Port Royal and Port Conway, which developed opposite each other, the former on the south bank, the latter on the north. The last navigable points for ocean-going ships, they were early ports for the export of tobacco, the major commodity crop.

As it flows past Tappahannock on its southern bank, the river is well over a mile wide. The last settlements of any size before it reaches the Chesapeake Bay are Irvington, Urbanna, Stingray Point, and White Stone Beach.

The broad river enters the Chesapeake Bay approximately 20 miles (32 km) south of the mouth of the Potomac River and approximately 60 miles (97 km) east of the state capital, Richmond. At the point where the river enters the bay, between Windmill Point, on the north, and Stingray Point, on the south, it is more than 3.5 miles (5.6 km) wide. This estuary, south of the Northern Neck peninsula, is a productive oyster and crab fishery.

Above Fredericksburg, the Rappahannock provides fine opportunities for recreational canoeing and kayaking. Most of the rapids are Class I and Class II in difficulty, but, near Remington, there are some rapids that are considered to be Class III.

The river's watershed is protected in various places as parcels of the Rappahannock River Valley National Wildlife Refuge.

== Oysters ==
The oysters that thrive in the estuary of the Rappahannock River are the least salty oysters of the East Coast. They are renowned for their sweet and smooth flavor, described as almost buttery. The low salinity allows a Blue Ridge minerality to come through. These oysters are known for being good to consume with wine.

The nutritious oysters were eaten on a large scale in 19th-century Washington. They were served fresh, grilled, stewed, or as part of a pie.

== History ==
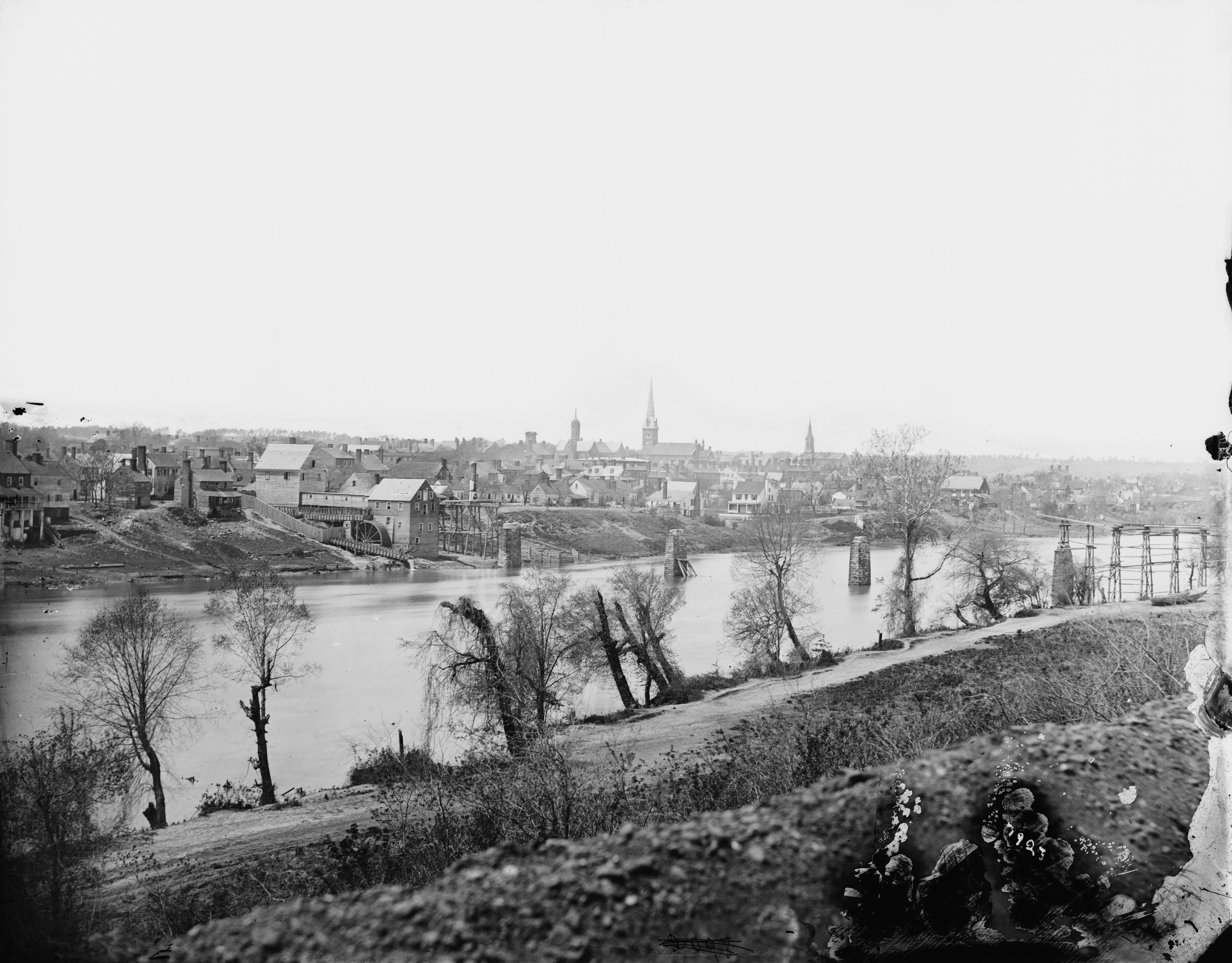
Fredericksburg, Virginia in March 1863. View from the north across the Rappahannock River.

The name of the river comes from an Algonquian word, lappihanne (also recorded as toppehannock), meaning "river of quick, rising water" or "where the tide ebbs and flows," the name used by the local Rappahannock tribe. In 2018 it became one of the federally recognized tribes in Virginia.

Although a few small hamlets developed along the lower Rappahannock during early colonial times, the settlement of the Rappahannock River valley began in earnest during the first years of the eighteenth century, at the urging of Governor Alexander Spotswood. The James River had been surveyed up to its fall line, the point where, geologically, continental bedrock of the Piedmont meets the sedimentary rocks and alluvial soils of the coastal plain. It is usually the last navigable portion of a river from the sea.

Spotswood encouraged settlement in a river valley other than that of the James. In 1714, he began recruiting Protestant immigrants from the Rhineland-Palatinate and Switzerland to homestead on lands he controlled near the confluence of the Rappahannock and the Rapidan. Known as the Germanna settlement(s), these villages were founded in order to exploit the iron ore deposits of the region.

During the War of 1812, the Battle of Rappahannock River was fought on the river. Seventeen British boats filled with hundreds of marines and sailors captured four American privateers.

During the American Civil War, the river, with few convenient fords and fewer bridges, provided a barrier and defensive line behind which movements of troops could be accomplished with little fear of attack from the river-side flank. It was an especially difficult barrier for Union troops to overcome in their attempts to thrust into southern Virginia, as they were vulnerable to attack while trying to cross the river on temporary bridges. Control of the river changed hands many times during the course of the war. Significant battles fought along the river include the Battle of Fredericksburg, the Battle of Chancellorsville, and two Battles of Rappahannock Station. The defensive line at the river was finally circumvented by General Ulysses S. Grant in the Wilderness (or Overland) Campaign of 1864, ending in the ultimate Union victory.

During and after the first battle at Fredericksburg in late December 1862, about 10,000 enslaved African Americans from area plantations and the city reached for their futures, crossing the river to gain freedom behind Union lines. This exodus and its "Trail of Freedom" was commemorated in 2010 by installation of historical markers on both sides of the river, in Fredericksburg and in Stafford County. The exodus to freedom is now celebrated in an annual re-enactment starting in Fredericksburg.

In some 18th- and 19th-century documents, including some Civil War records, the Rappahannock River was referred to as "Hedgeman's River". A 1736–1737 survey labeled the Rappahannock above the mouth of the Rapidan as "Cannon", and further upstream it was identified as "Hedgeman's River," named after Nathaniel Hedgeman, an early settler of the region.

== See also ==
- Ferry Farm
- Knights of the Golden Horseshoe Expedition
- List of rivers of Virginia
- Robert O. Norris Bridge
- Stingray Point Light
- Windmill Point Light
