= Philip Ludwell Lee =

Virginia colony tobacco planter (1727–1775)

Member of the Virginia Governor's Council
- In office 1757–1774

Member of the House of Burgesses for Westmoreland County
- In office 1756–1757 Serving with Augustine Washington Jr.
- Preceded by: Charles Barber
- Succeeded by: Richard Henry Lee

Personal details
- Born: February 24, 1727 "Mount Pleasant" plantation near Machodoc, Westmoreland County, Colony of Virginia
- Died: February 21, 1775 (aged 47) Stratford Hall, Westmoreland County, Colony of Virginia
- Spouse: Elizabeth Steptoe
- Relations: Francis Lightfoot Lee, Richard Henry Lee, William, Arthur Lee (brothers), Hannah Lee Corbin (sister)
- Parent(s): Thomas Lee, Hannah Harrison Ludwell
- Education: England, including Inner Temple
- Occupation: planter, lawyer, politician
- Known for: Stratford Hall

Philip Ludwell Lee (February 24, 1727 – February 21, 1775) (sometimes nicknamed "Colonel Phil") was a Virginia planter and politician who briefly represented Westmoreland County on Virginia's Northern Neck in the House of Burgesses in 1756 before serving on the Virginia Governor's Council (1757-1774).

== Early and family life ==
Lee was born in late 1727 or early 1728 at one of the Lee family plantations, either "Mount Pleasant" in Westmoreland County (destroyed by arson in 1729) or "Paradise" in Gloucester County. (Note: Although Alexander cites tradition that all the sons were born at Stratford Hall Plantation, it was only constructed after the fire during his infancy) Both his parents, Thomas Lee and Hannah Harrison Ludwell were of the First Families of Virginia, with considerable wealth as well as political power. His elder brother died shortly after being christened "Richard Lee" in February 1727. The family would also include Richard Henry Lee, Francis Lightfoot Lee, Arthur Lee, William Lee and Hannah Lee Corbin. Shortly after his father's death in 1750, this Philip Lee returned from England, where he had graduated from Eton and was studying law. He then assumed responsibility for his orphaned younger siblings.

In 1763 he married his heiress ward, Elizabeth, daughter of James Steptoe of Westmoreland County, who survived him and remarried to Philip Richard Fendall, but their son died as an infant. (Note: Note that Forgotten Book's re-publication was of his unrevised edition and pagination differs, to pp. 97-100) Matilda would marry her cousin Lighthorse Henry Lee (whose financial profligacy caused difficulties for later generations) and Flora married her cousin Ludwell Lee.

== Career ==
Although nicknamed "Colonel Phil" for his rank in the local militia, Lee's primary business was operating Stratford Hall and associated plantations he inherited mostly pursuant to primogeniture (including more than 12,000 acres in what had been Northumberland and Stafford Counties in Virginia). He participated in the creation of Loudoun County in 1757 from Fairfax County, which had been formed from Prince William County in 1742, which had been formed from Stafford county in 1731). Lee also owned acreage on Maryland's Eastern Shore and two islands. His property in Dorchester County, Maryland, on the northwest fork of the Nanticoke River had been part of land owned by Capt. John Lee, who died without children, so it was inherited by his brother Richard Lee of "Mount Pleasant" (this man's grandfather). He in turned willed it to his younger sons Philip Corbin Lee and Thomas Lee (this man's father, who called his 1300-acre plantation "Rehoboth" and established an entail so it would be inherited by his eldest son, i.e. this man). Lee also owned many slaves (including over 100 at the 2800 acre Stratford plantation alone). He increased his landholdings in 1763 by marrying his heiress ward, but they had no children that survived their parents.

Westmoreland County voters elected Philip Lee as one of their representatives in the House of Burgesses, but he only served part of his term, being succeeded by his younger brother Richard Henry Lee. He resigned his position in the lower house of the Virginia General Assembly upon being nominated to the upper house of the Virginia General Assembly Council of State, and that appointment was ratified by the Board of Trade in London, so his service in the upper house began in 1757 and continued until his death.

Col. Phil became unpopular with his younger siblings because of the slow pace at which he settled their father's estate (that is awarded them their inheritances). Although he attributed the delays to needing to settle debts incurred by their father, they resented his lavish entertainments at Stratford Hall.

== Death and legacy ==
Col. Philip L. Lee died at Stratford Hall in 1775, as relations between England and her Virginia colony became strained. Two of his brothers, Richard Henry Lee and Francis Lightfoot Lee would become signatories of the U.S. Declaration of Independence.

In modern times, the Rehoboth property became known as "Lee Mansion." Dorchester County records concerning Philip Ludwell Lee's share of Rehoboth are unclear, because many records of its subdivision were lost over time, especially when arsonists burned down his father's house. His cousin Philip Corbin Lee's share had been inherited by his son Francis Lee who served in the Maryland General Assembly in 1745, but moved slightly north into Cecil County the following year. In 1787 his sister Letitia Corbin Lee of Harford County sold 200 acres called "Rehoboth" to John Smoot. Major Frank Turpin, a Revolutionary War veteran owned it for many years, and became known for his lavish hospitality.
