= Lee Family Digital Archive =

Archive of the Lee family of the United States

The Lee Family Digital Archive is a scholarly effort to collect, edit, and disseminate the papers of the Lee family of Virginia. The Lees of Virginia included Richard Lee I, the immigrant founder of the family, who came to Virginia from England around 1640, and his descendants. Some of the most famous Lees are Thomas Lee, a colonist of Virginia; Richard Henry Lee and Francis Lightfoot Lee, signers of the Declaration of Independence; Arthur Lee, an early American diplomat and abolitionist; Light-Horse Harry Lee, a cavalry officer of the Continental army, three-time governor of Virginia, and the father of Robert E. Lee; Thomas Sim Lee, Revolutionary governor of Maryland; Richard Bland Lee; Charles Lee (Attorney General), 3rd U. S. Attorney General; Richard Bland Lee II, a noted explorer; Robert E. Lee, the Confederate general who is by far the most famous of the family; William Henry Fitzhugh (Rooney) Lee, the son of Robert E. Lee and a U.S. Congressman from Virginia; and Fitzhugh Lee, Governor of Virginia and Civil War cavalry general. President Zachary Taylor was a Lee descendant, on his mother's side.

A comprehensive search for Lee Family papers, which are widely scattered, is ongoing.

Since October 2014, the Lee Family Digital Archive has been hosted by Stratford Hall, which was built by Thomas Lee and where Robert E. Lee was born. Dr. Colin Woodward, a historian of the Civil War era and the U.S. South, is the Editor of the Lee Family Digital Archive. Previously, the archive was hosted by Washington and Lee University in Lexington, Virginia, and directed by Frank E. Grizzard, Jr., a historian, author, and editor. The LFDA also contains the full text of many relevant secondary sources to the Lees and a section on George Washington.

== See also ==
- Lee Family of Virginia
- Richard Lee, The Scholar
- George Washington Custis Lee
