= Hannah Lee Corbin =

American planter and feminist

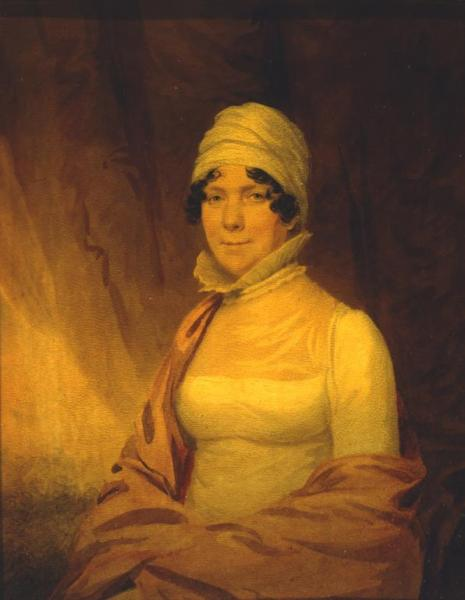
- Born: Hannah Ludwell Lee; February 6, 1728; Westmoreland County, Colony of Virginia, British America
- Died: c. October 7, 1782
- Spouse: Gawin Corbin (m. 1747; died 1760)
- Children: 3
- Parent(s): Thomas Lee (father); Hannah Ludwell (mother)

Hannah Ludwell Lee Corbin (February 6, 1728 – c. October 7, 1782) was an American women's rights advocate and member of the Lee family in Virginia. A controversial widow in her own time in part for her refusal to marry her paramour (with whom she had children) or conversion from the Church of England to the Baptists, she may today be best known for asking that women be given the right to vote.

== Personal life ==
Lee Family Coat of Arms

A member of the politically influential Lee family, Hannah Ludwell Lee was born on February 6, 1728, on her parents' Stratford Hall plantation in Westmoreland County, Virginia. Her father was prominent civil servant Thomas Lee and her mother was colonial heiress Hannah Ludwell. The fourth of eleven children, her siblings included Philip Ludwell; Francis Lightfoot and Richard Henry, both of whom signed the United States Declaration of Independence; Thomas Ludwell; diplomat Arthur; alderman; William; and Alice. In 1747, Hannah Lee married her cousin Gawin Corbin, who had succeeded his father as burgess but died in 1760 from injuries sustained in a horse-riding mishap; they had one daughter, Martha.

Following her husband's death, Corbin inherited vast swathes of property, including 500 acres (200 ha) in Lancaster County and 2,250 acres (910 ha) in Caroline County, as well as slaves. She subsequently cohabited with physician Richard Lingan Hall (died 1774), although they never married and she gave their children the Corbin surname, so as to not violate her husband's will, which stipulated that her inheritance would be forfeited if she remarried; Corbin and Hall had a son, Elisha, and a daughter, also named Martha. Formerly an attendee of the Church of England, Corbin became a member of the Baptist church around 1764, to the disapproval of her siblings.

== Career ==
In March 1778, Corbin wrote to her brother Richard Henry, complaining about the "male domination in law and politics", while arguing for women's suffrage: "Why should widows pay taxes when they have no voice in making the laws or in choosing the men who made them?" In response, he asserted that women were "already possessed of that right". According to The Virginia Baptist Register, Corbin was the "first Virginia woman to take a stand for women's rights".

== Death and legacy ==
She died around October 7, 1782.
