= Thomas Ludwell Lee =

American politician (1730–1778)

Member of the Virginia House of Burgesses representing Stafford County
- In office 1758–1765 Serving with Thompson Mason, William Fitzhugh
- Preceded by: Peter Hedgman
- Succeeded by: John Alexander
- In office 1775–1776 Serving with Charles Carter
- Preceded by: John Alexander
- Succeeded by: office abolished

Member of the Virginia Senate representing King George, Stafford, and Westmoreland Counties
- In office October 7, 1776 – April 13, 1778
- Preceded by: office created
- Succeeded by: Thomas Jett

Personal details
- Born: December 13, 1730 Stratford Hall Plantation, Westmoreland County, Virginia
- Died: April 13, 1778 (aged 47) Belleview, Stafford County, Virginia
- Spouse: Mary Aylett
- Occupation: planter

Thomas Ludwell Lee, Sr. (December 13, 1730 – April 13, 1778) was a Virginia planter and politician who served in the House of Burgesses and later the Virginia Senate, and may be best known as one of the editors of the Virginia Declaration of Rights. He was a member of the Lee Family of Virginia.

== Early life ==
Lee was born on December 13, 1730, probably at Stratford Hall Plantation, Westmoreland County, Virginia to Thomas Lee and his wife Hannah Harrison Ludwell. Born into the First Families of Virginia (as described below), he was the couple's third son and the second to survive into adulthood. Although the couple's firstborn son died shortly after being christened "Richard Lee", in February 1727 Hannah Ludwell Lee bore Philip Ludwell Lee (1727–1775) and named him for her beloved father. The man later known as "Colonel Phil" would be the first of her sons to survive, and he returned to Virginia from England (where he had graduated from Eton and was studying law) upon his father's death in late 1750. Col. Phil then assumed responsibility for this boy and his other orphaned younger siblings, as well as operated Stratford Hall and associated plantations he inherited mostly pursuant to primogeniture (including more than 12,000 acres in Northumberland and Stafford Counties in Virginia as well as acreage on Maryland's Eastern Shore and two islands) and many slaves (including over 100 at the 2800 acre Stratford plantation alone). Colonel Phil would be named to Virginia's Council of State in 1757, and increased his landholdings in 1763 by marrying his heiress ward, but he became unpopular with his younger siblings for the slow pace at which he settled their father's estate, contrasted with his lavish entertainments at Stratford Hall.

This brother, Thomas Ludwell Lee, was the other co-executor of their father's estate, inheriting land in Stafford county, 50 slaves and his father's gold watch, but remained in England until 1756 to finish his legal studies at the Inner Temple. His older sister had been born at the family's Machodoc plantation in Westmoreland County and named Hannah Ludwell Lee (1729–1782) to honor her mother, who was highly involved in raising Philip and Hannah and running the family's estates during her husband's long absences on family and government business, but much less involved in raising their six youngest children, possibly in part from distress because arson burned the Machodoc plantation house later in 1729, necessitating temporary stays with various Lee relatives during Stratford Hall's completion and the family's resettlement. Mother Hannah Lee had died aged 49 on January 25, 1750; her husband had her buried at what became known as Burnt House Field graveyard at Machodoc, and wrote a will expressing his intent to be buried beside her, as happened by year's end. When Thomas Ludwell Lee returned from England in 1756, he empathized with his less-wealthy younger brothers Richard Henry Lee (born 1730, and who inherited land in Prince William County as well as 40 slaves), Francis Lightfoot Lee (born 1734, and who inherited land then in the part of Fairfax County that became Loudoun County and 30 slaves), William Lee (born 1739, and who married an heiress) and Arthur Lee (born 1740), and their sister Alice Lee Shippen (1736–1817; who moved to Philadelphia but continued involved in Lee family matters), all became involved in the American Revolutionary War.

== Planter and politician ==
Thomas Ludwell Lee resided at Belleview, a plantation in Stafford County, Virginia, and farmed using enslaved labor. In September 1763, he hosted the first annual meeting of the Mississippi Company at Belleview. George Washington (1732–1799) and his brother, John Augustine Washington, attended that event in September 1763.

In 1758, a year after Col. Philip Lee's accession to the Virginia Council of State (normally a lifetime appointment), his brothers and cousins, led by Richard Henry Lee, began their legislative involvement in the House of Burgesses. Stafford County voters elected Thomas Ludwell Lee as one of their delegates to the House of Burgesses in 1758, and he won re-election once before returning to private life. In the previous session, Richard Lee (Henry Lee's son and unmarried squire of Lee Hall since 1747) became one of Westmoreland County's representatives and would continue as such winning re-election until 1793; and in 1758 his favorite nephew, this man's brother Richard Henry Lee, won his first of what would be many terms in the House of Burgesses. Moreover, Francis Lightfoot Lee won his first term as Burgess from newly created Loudoun County, and cousin John Lee represented Essex County. Colonel Philip Lee, who always considered England "home", fell ill with a "nervous pleurisy" shortly after New Year's Day 1775 and died on February 21, 1775.

The months after his death proved the eve of the American Revolutionary War. John Alexander (who had replaced Thomas Ludwell Lee as Burgess from Stafford County) also died, so Thomas Ludwell Lee returned to at what proved to be the last session of the House of Burgesses, for Virginia's governor suppressed the assembly. He then continued his political involvement as one of Stafford County's representatives to the Third, Fourth and Fifth Virginia Conventions. Meanwhile, his brothers William and Arthur Lee from England encouraged their Virginia kinsman from England to establish committees of correspondence and keep in step with agitation in Massachusetts, and Richard Henry Lee and Francis Lightfoot Lee were the radicals in Virginia's delegation to the Continental Congress. Thomas Ludwell Lee and his cousin Richard Lee corresponded with their kinfolk in Philadelphia and kept Williamsburg politics in sync, forwarding resolutions to Philadelphia which Tom Lee had helped prepare, and imploring R.H. Lee to return to Williamsburg to help draft a constitution for Virginia (his words "We cannot do without you" would be engraved on Richard Henry Lee's tombstone).

Unlike his brothers, Lee refused to enter into national politics. John Adams, quoting George Wythe, once said that Lee was "the delight of the eyes of every Virginian, but would not engage in public life."

After Virginia established its own constitution, and the Virginia General Assembly became bicameral, Lee was elected to the Virginia Senate to represent the Northern Neck of Virginia--King George, Stafford, and Westmoreland Counties, and served in that part-time position until his death less than two years later. On October 14, 1776, he was appointed to a committee headed by Thomas Jefferson and including Wythe, Edmund Pendleton, and George Mason to revise, amend, or repeal any Virginia law, subject to the approval of the Virginia House of Delegates.

== Personal life ==
Thomas married Mary Aylett, who bore six children as shown below, and survived him. Mary was the daughter of William Aylett and Elizabeth Eskridge (1719). When widowed, Elizabeth remarried, to Dr. James Steptoe, Col. (1709–1757).

- 1. Thomas Ludwell Lee, Jr. (c. 1752–1807), who married Frances "Fanny" Carter (c. 1755), daughter of Robert Wormley Carter (c. 1735–1797) of Sabine Hall and Winifred Tavener Beale (c. 1740).
- 2. William Aylett Lee (c. 1754), who died young).
- 3. George Lee, Sr. (c. 1756–1802), who married Evelyn Byrd Beverley (1782). Evelyn married secondly, Dr. Patrick Hume Douglas. Evelyn was the daughter of Robert Beverley (1740–1800) and Maria Carter (1745–1817).
- 4. Anne Fenton Lee (c. 1758), who married Daniel Carroll Brent (1759–1814), son of William Brent III (1733–1782) and Eleanor Carroll.
- 5. Lucinda Lee (c. 1760), who married John Dalrymple Orr (1761), son of John Orr (1726) and Susan Monroe Grayson (1743).
- 6. Rebecca Lee (c. 1763).

== Ancestry ==
Coat of Arms of Thomas Ludwell Lee

Thomas was the son of Col. Thomas Lee, Hon. (1690–1750) of Stratford Hall, Westmoreland Co., Virginia. Thomas married Hannah Harrison Ludwell (1701–1750).

Hannah was the daughter of Col. Philip Ludwell II (1672–1726) of "Greenspring", and Hannah Harrison (1679–1731).

Thomas was the son of Col. Richard Lee II, Esq., "the scholar" (1647–1715) and Laetitia Corbin (c. 1657–1706).

Laetitia was the daughter of Richard's neighbor and, Councillor, Hon. Henry Corbin, Sr. (1629–1676) and Alice (Eltonhead) Burnham (c. 1627–1684).

Richard II, was the son of Col. Richard Lee I, Esq., "the immigrant" (1618–1664) and Anne Constable (c. 1621–1666).

Anne was the daughter of Francis Constable and a ward of Sir John Thoroughgood.
