= Richard "Squire" Lee =

American politician

Richard Lee

Member of the Virginia House of Delegates representing Westmoreland County
- In office 1776–1795 Serving with John Augustine Washington, Richard Henry Lee, Richard Parker, Daniel McCarty, Henry Lee Jr, Bushrod Washington, William Augustine Washington, Henry Lee, Willoughby Newton
- Preceded by: position established
- Succeeded by: Daniel McCarty

Member of the Virginia House of Burgesses representing Westmoreland County
- In office 1757–1775 Serving with Richard Henry Lee
- Preceded by: Philip Ludwell Lee
- Succeeded by: position eliminated

Personal details
- Born: ca. 1726 "Lee Hall", Westmoreland County, Colony of Virginia
- Died: 1795 (aged 68–69) Westmoreland County, Virginia
- Spouse: Sarah Bland Poythress
- Relations: John Lee (brother); Richard Lee II(grandfather)
- Parent(s): Henry Lee I and Mary Bland
- Occupation: planter, clerk, legislator

Richard Lee (1726–1795), known most commonly as "Squire", was a prominent Virginia planter, member of the Lee family of Virginia, and American politician, who was active in the American Revolutionary War. He represented Westmoreland County Virginia continuously (but on a part-time basis) in the Virginia General Assembly from 1757 when the lower house was known as the House of Burgesses, through the five Virginia Revolutionary Conventions until his death in 1795 (when it was known as the Virginia House of Delegates). Complicating matters, he had a cousin also known as Squire Richard Lee, who built Blenheim in Maryland.

== Early and family life ==
He was born at "Lee Hall" in Westmoreland County, Virginia, the third of seven children born to Henry Lee I (1691–1747) and Mary Bland (1704–1764). His eldest brother John Lee (1724–1767) inherited land by the will of his father as well as served as clerk of nearby Essex County. His brother Henry moved to Leesylvania in Prince William County, and his sister Letitia married Col. William Ball of Lancaster County. Through his father's brother, Thomas 1690–1750, he was the first cousin to Founding Fathers Richard Henry Lee and Francis Lightfoot Lee—both signers of the Declaration of Independence.

== Career ==
Squire Lee served in the Virginia House of Burgesses, as a representative from Westmoreland, after his cousin Philip Ludwell Lee was elevated to the Council of State (the legislature's upper hours), and the burgess position became vacant in 1757. Beginning in 1758, Westmoreland voters elected this man alongside his cousin Richard Henry Lee until Governor Dunmore dissolved the House of Burgesses in 1775. Westmoreland voters then continuously elected both men to all the Virginia Revolutionary Conventions, adding John Augustine Washington when three representatives were permitted beginning in the Third Revolutionary Convention, though J.A. Washington was disqualified in the 4th convention. Thus he served in the Virginia Constitutional Convention, which drafted the 1776 version of the Constitution of Virginia. Upon creation of the Virginia House of Delegates in 1776, after Virginia signed the Declaration of Independence and the American Revolutionary War began, Richard Lee continued winning re-election and representing Westmoreland County in the legislature until his death, although he had a number of different co-delegates.

Lee also served as Justice of the Peace for Westmoreland County, Virginia and was a Naval Officer for the Port of Potomac.

== Personal life ==
In 1786, at the age of 60, he married his cousin, 17-year-old Sarah Bland "Sally" Poythress (1768 – 24 May 1828), a daughter of Peter Poythress (1715–1785) of "Branchester" and Elizabeth Bland (1733–1792). The couple had at least 6 children;

1. Richard Lee II (1788–1790)
2. Mary Lee (12 February 1790 – 1848) who married Thomas Jones of Chesterfield County, Virginia
3. Lettice Lee (1792–1827) who married Dr. John Augustine Smith
4. Mattie Mae Lee (b. 1792) who married John Holmes Smith
5. a son who died in infancy (c. 1793)
6. Richardia (b. 1795) who married Presley Cox in 1815

== Death and legacy ==
He died at Lee hall in 1795 and was buried there. After his death, his widow Sally married secondly Willoughby Newton and was the mother of Willoughby Newton.
