= Elizabeth Eaton (silversmith) =

English silversmith

- Occupation: Silversmith

Elizabeth Eaton was an English silversmith.

Classified as a manufacturing silversmith, Eaton registered her mark in 1845, giving an address of 16 Jewin Crescent, Aldersgate, St. Cripplegate. She was the widow of manufacturing silversmith William Eaton (died 1845), with whom she had a son, John; her second mark was registered in partnership with him in 1854. She showed work at the Great Exhibition of 1851.

The National Museum of Women in the Arts owns two works by Eaton, a Victorian salt spoon of 1849 and a Victorian asparagus tongs of 1852. A pair of salt spoons dating to 1845-46 are in the collection of silver donated by Margaret Law to Stratford Hall.
