= Hannah Harrison Ludwell Lee =

Wife of Thomas Lee (1701–1750)

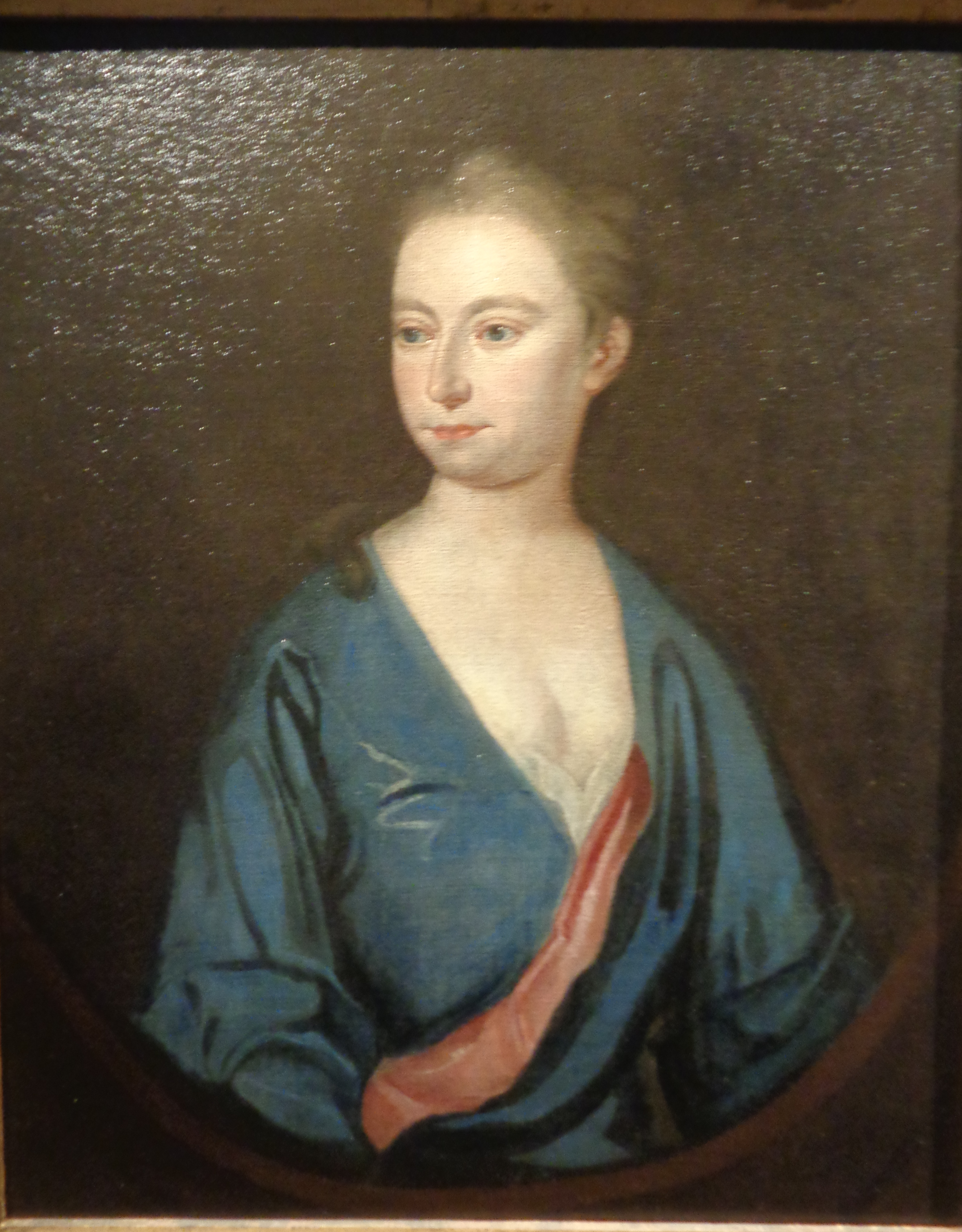
- Born: Hannah Harrison Ludwell; December 5, 1701; Green Spring Plantation, James City County, Colony of Virginia
- Died: January 25, 1750 (aged 48); Stratford Hall, Westmoreland, Colony of Virginia
- Resting place: Mount Pleasant, Hague, Virginia
- Spouse: Thomas Lee
- Children: 11 (including Thomas, Richard, Francis, William, and Arthur)
- Parent(s): Philip Ludwell II; Hannah Harrison

Hannah Harrison Ludwell Lee (December 5, 1701 – January 25, 1750) was an American colonial heiress and the wife of Colonel Thomas Lee. A granddaughter of Philip Ludwell and Benjamin Harrison II, she was a prominent figure within the American gentry. She grew up at Green Spring Plantation, her family's home in James City County. Upon her marriage, she became a member of the Lee family, bringing a large dowry and social prestige to the family. With her dowry, she and her husband built Stratford Hall, the family seat of the Lees.

== Early life and family ==
Lee was born Hannah Harrison Ludwell on December 5, 1701, at Green Spring Plantation to Hannah Harrison Ludwell and Philip Cottington Ludwell II. She was their second daughter. Her father served as a member of the Virginia Governor's Council and was an auditor of the king's revenue. Her paternal grandfather, Philip Ludwell, was the first Governor of the Province of Carolina and served as Speaker of the Virginia House of Burgesses. Through her mother, Ludwell was a descendant of the Harrison family of Virginia. Her maternal grandfather, Benjamin Harrison II, served as a sheriff, a member of the Virginia House of Burgesses, and as a member of the Governor's Council. She was a niece of Benjamin Harrison III.

Lee's brother, Philip Ludwell III, was the earliest-known Eastern Orthodox Christian in North America after his conversion to Russian Orthodoxy in 1738.

== Marriage and children ==
In May 1722 she married Thomas Lee at her family's plantation. She brought a large dowry, as well as social and political prestige, to the marriage, therefore increasing her husband's wealth and status in the colony. She and her husband had eleven children:

- Richard Lee (b. 1723)
- Philip Ludwell Lee (February 24, 1726 – February 21, 1775)
- John Lee (b. 1728 d. 1782)
- Hannah Ludwell Lee (February 1729 – 1782)
- Thomas Ludwell Lee (December 13, 1730 – April 13, 1778); a member of the Virginia Delegates and editor of the Virginia Declaration of Rights.
- Richard Henry Lee (January 20, 1732 – January 19, 1794); sponsor of the Lee Resolution, signer of the United States Declaration of Independence
- Francis Lightfoot Lee (October 14, 1734 – January 11, 1797); signer of the United States Declaration of Independence. Married Rebecca Tayloe, daughter of John Tayloe II of Mount Airy. Tayloe built Menokin for his daughter and her new husband.
- Alice Lee (June 4, 1736 – March 25, 1817)
- William Lee (August 31, 1737 – June 27, 1795)
- James Lee (b. and d. 1739)
- Arthur Lee (December 21, 1740 – December 12, 1792)

The family lived on a plantation in Machodoc until it was destroyed by a fire in 1728. Lee, who was pregnant with her fourth child, was thrown from her room on the second floor in order to escape the flames, resulting in the miscarriage of a son. The family reportedly lost no less than 50,000 pounds due to the fire. The British government later gave her husband 300 pounds as compensation, and Queen Caroline gave them money to finance rebuilding the plantation. While their home was being rebuilt, the family stayed at Lee Hall Mansion, the home of Lee's brother-in-law. The family later lived at Stratford Hall in Westmoreland County, Virginia. Lee's husband built Stratford with money from her dowry. She played a significant role in the design and construction of the house.

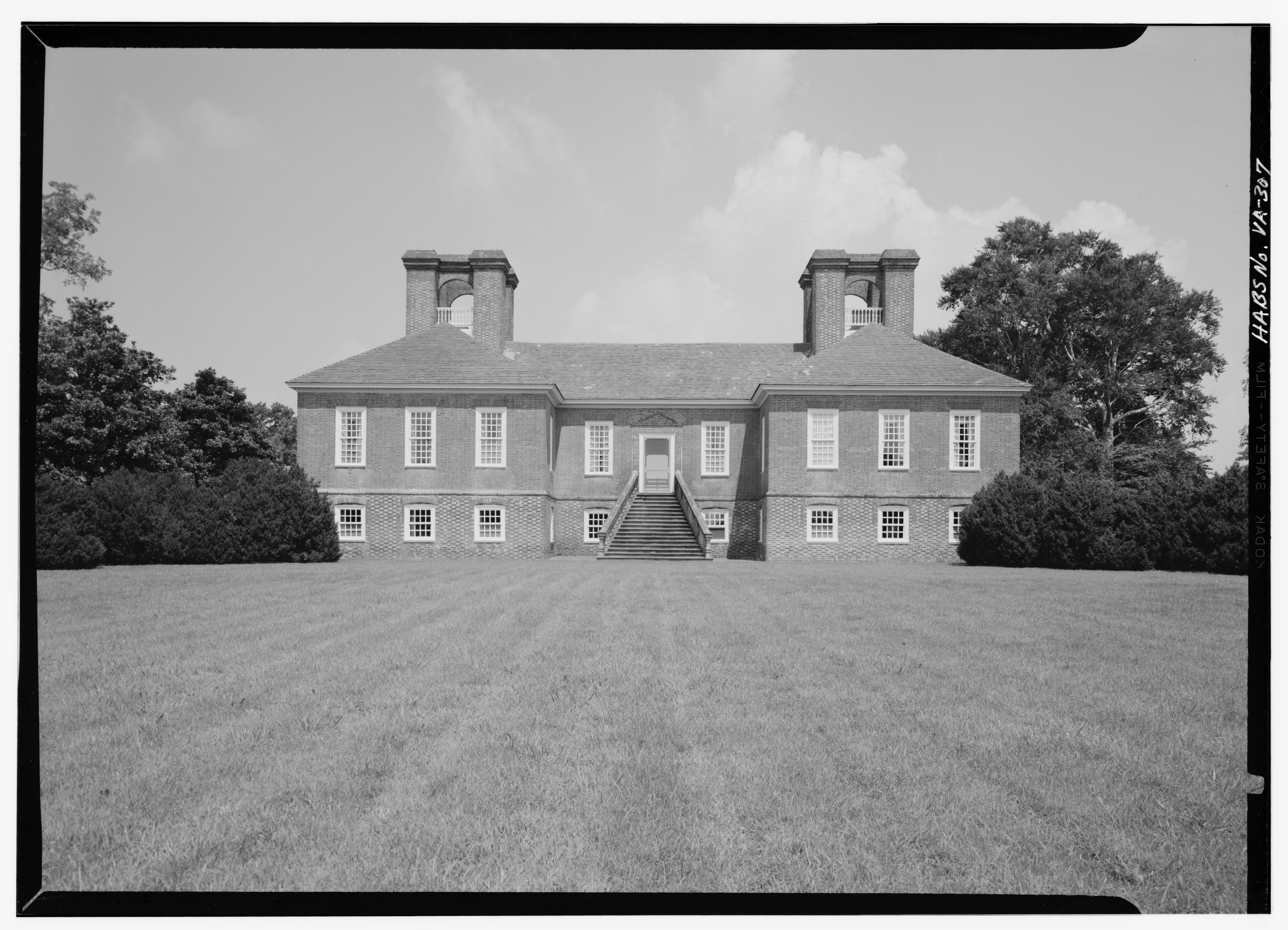
Stratford Hall

Lee's husband served as a vestryman, a justice of the peace, as a member of the House of Burgesses, and as a member of the Governor's Council. He served as de facto governor of the colony in 1749, when he was named President of the King's Council of Virginia after Governor William Gooch was recalled to England. He was nominated for an appointment as governor by George II, but died before the appointment took place.

== Death and burial ==
She died on January 25, 1750, at Stratford Hall. She was buried in the Burnt House Fields Cemetery at Mount Pleasant in January 1751. Her grave was later moved to Stratford.
