= Thomas Lee (Virginia colonist) =

Virginia colonist (c.1690–1750)

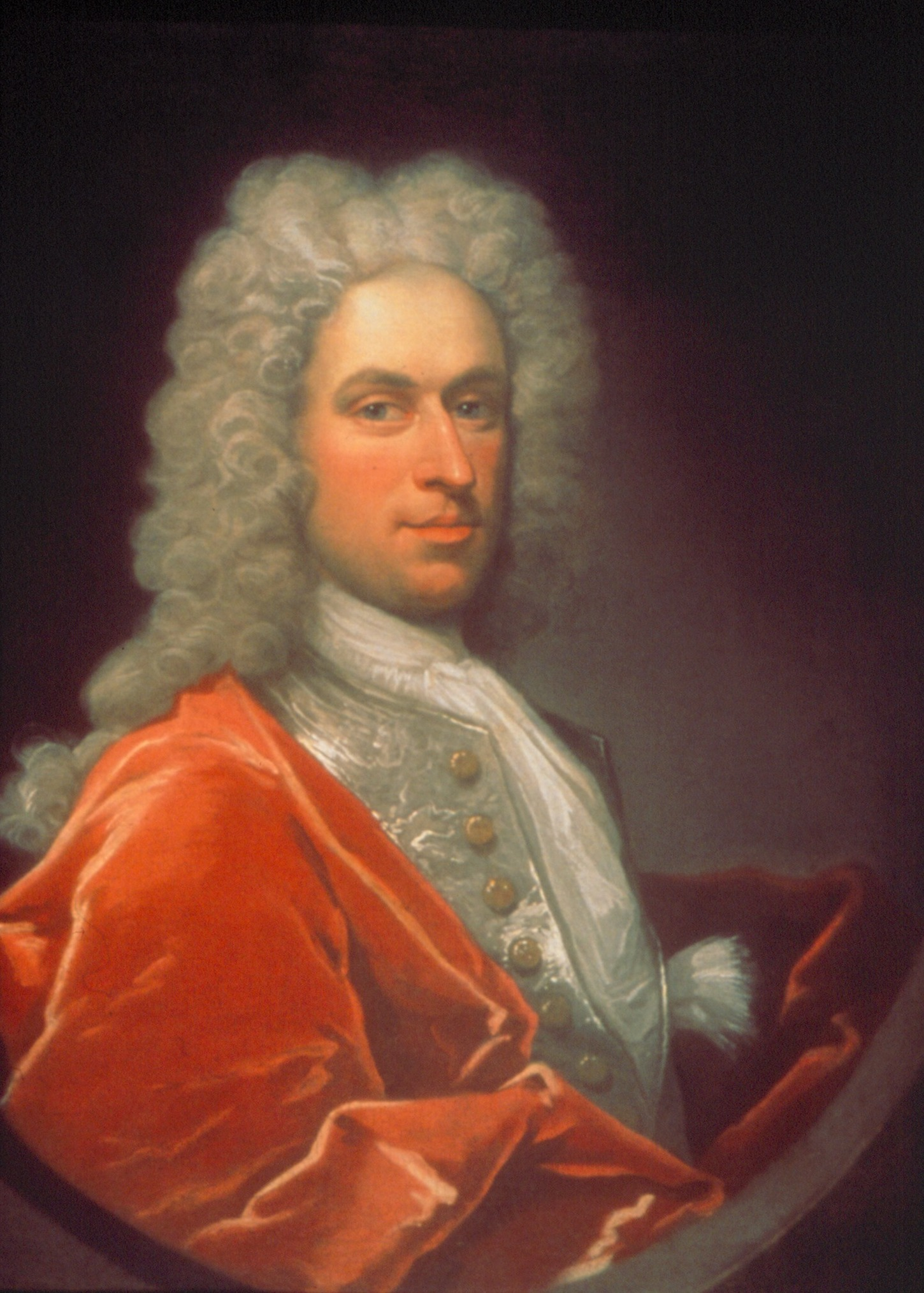
- Portrait of Lee

Royal Governor of Virginia
- Acting; August 24, 1749 – November 14, 1750
- Monarch: George II
- Preceded by: John Robinson
- Succeeded by: Lewis Burwell

Member of the Virginia Council of State
- In office 1733–1750

Member of the Virginia House of Burgesses from Westmoreland County
- In office 1726–1733 Serving with George Eskridge
- Preceded by: Daniel McCarty
- Succeeded by: Daniel McCarty Jr.

Personal details
- Born: c. 1690 Mount Pleasant at Machodoc River, Westmoreland County, Colony of Virginia
- Died: November 14, 1750 (aged 59-60) Stratford Hall, Westmoreland County, Colony of Virginia
- Spouse: Hannah Harrison Ludwell (m. 1722; died 1750)
- Children: 11, including Philip, Richard, Thomas, Francis, William, Arthur, and Hannah
- Parents: Richard Lee II; Laetitia Corbin
- Education: College of William & Mary

Colonel Thomas Lee (c. 1690 – November 14, 1750) was a planter and politician in colonial Virginia, and a member of the Lee family, a political dynasty. Lee became involved in politics in 1710, serving in both houses of the Virginia General Assembly, and also held important positions as Naval Officer for the Northern Potomac Region and agent for the Northern Neck Proprietary. After his father died, Lee inherited thousands of acres of land as well as enslaved people in then-vast Northumberland and Stafford Counties in Virginia as well as across the Potomac River in Charles County, Maryland. These properties were developed as tobacco plantations. Northumberland County was later subdivided, so some of Lee's properties were in present-day Fairfax, Fauquier, Prince William, and Loudoun counties and counties in the present-day Northern Neck of Virginia.

When Lee married Hannah Harrison Ludwell in 1722, he benefited from the connections of the already established Harrison family of Virginia. A year later, he would become a member of the House of Burgesses. Arson destroyed Lee's home, he used money from Caroline of Ansbach and Britain to build Stratford Hall overlooking the Potomac River. Four years later, in 1733, he was appointed to the Governor's Council, the upper house of the General Assembly. In 1747, he founded the Ohio Company of Virginia with fellow Virginian colonists who wished to expand Virginia's territory into the Ohio River Valley. For less than a year, in 1749 until his death in 1750, Lee served as the de facto royal governor of Virginia in place of the absent William Gooch.

== Early life and education ==
Thomas Lee was born around 1690 at Mount Pleasant, on the Machodoc River in Westmoreland County, Virginia. His parents were Colonel Richard Lee, "the scholar", and Laetitia Corbin, daughter of Henry Corbin. His ancestors had immigrated from Coton, Shropshire, to Virginia in 1642. As the fourth son of the couple, Lee would not receive as large an inheritance as his older brothers.

Lee attended college at the College of William & Mary around 1700. Lee's education was referred to as a "common Virginia education". He soon became interested in the working of the tobacco industry. He left home to work with his uncle Thomas Corbin in the tobacco business.

== Planter and naval officer ==
Coat of Arms of Thomas Lee

Lee's political career began in 1710 when he was appointed Naval Officer of the Northern Potomac River region. His father previously held the position, and resigned in favor of this son. The lucrative position involved collecting taxes for tobacco exported to England. In 1711, two of Lee's uncles, Thomas Corbin and Edmund Jenings, helped Lee become the Virginia agent for the Northern Neck Proprietary. This property consisted of all the land between the Potomac and Rappahnnock rivers, with Lee responsible for collecting the quit-rent.

Fellow planter Robert "King" Carter had previously held the position as Virginia-based agent, as had Jenings, and Carter regained it from this man in 1720 or 1722. While Jenings was in England, the agency's offices were located at Machodoc and under Lee's supervision. This lucrative position and multiple accusations of mismanagement led to decades of animosity between the Lee and Carter families.

In 1714, upon his father's death, Lee inherited lands in Northumberland County near Dividing Creek, as well as land in Maryland adjoining land inherited by Maryland-based his brother Philip from their childless uncle Captain John Lee. He leased the "Machodoc" estate from his elder brother Richard Lee III who was then living in London and experiencing severe financial problems. That same year Thomas visited England and remained for about a year attempting to resolve those finances.

Lee and his brother Henry negotiated a lease for 99 years on the Machodoc plantation from Richard's widow after his death. While in England, Lee also bought Clifts Plantation, on the Potomac River in Westmoreland County.

== Political career ==
In 1720 Thomas Lee attempted to begin a political career as one of the two Burgesses representing Westmoreland County. While voters clearly elected George Eskridge, the contest between Thomas Lee and fellow planter Daniel McCarty proved close. Although Lee was initially announced as the winner, McCarty successfully contested the results. McCarty was also elected as the burgess to accompany George Eskridge in 1723 but died before the 1726 session, so Lee succeeded him. Lee did win election in 1728 but relinquished the seat upon appointment to the legislature's upper house, the Governor's Council, in 1733, and McCarty's son, Daniel McCarty Jr. succeeded him.

Lee also served as a vestryman for Cople Parish and Justice of the Peace in Westmoreland County. In 1723, Lee became a member of the House of Burgesses. He held this office until he was appointed to the Governor's Council in the Virginia General Assembly in 1733. This position was a lifetime appointment. The council was made up of twelve appointed by the Governor of Virginia and was the upper half of the Virginia General Assembly. The lower half comprised the House of Burgesses. This position also gave Lee the rank of Colonel, a military rank that was second only to the governor. Council members were advisers to the governor and judges in the colony's General Court. Their work led them to spend about a third of the year in the capital Williamsburg.

When Governor William Gooch was recalled to England in 1749, Lee was the longest serving member and thus President of the King's Council of Virginia and Commander-in-Chief of the colony. Nominated for appointment as Governor of Virginia by King George II, he died before it took place.

=== Marriage and family ===
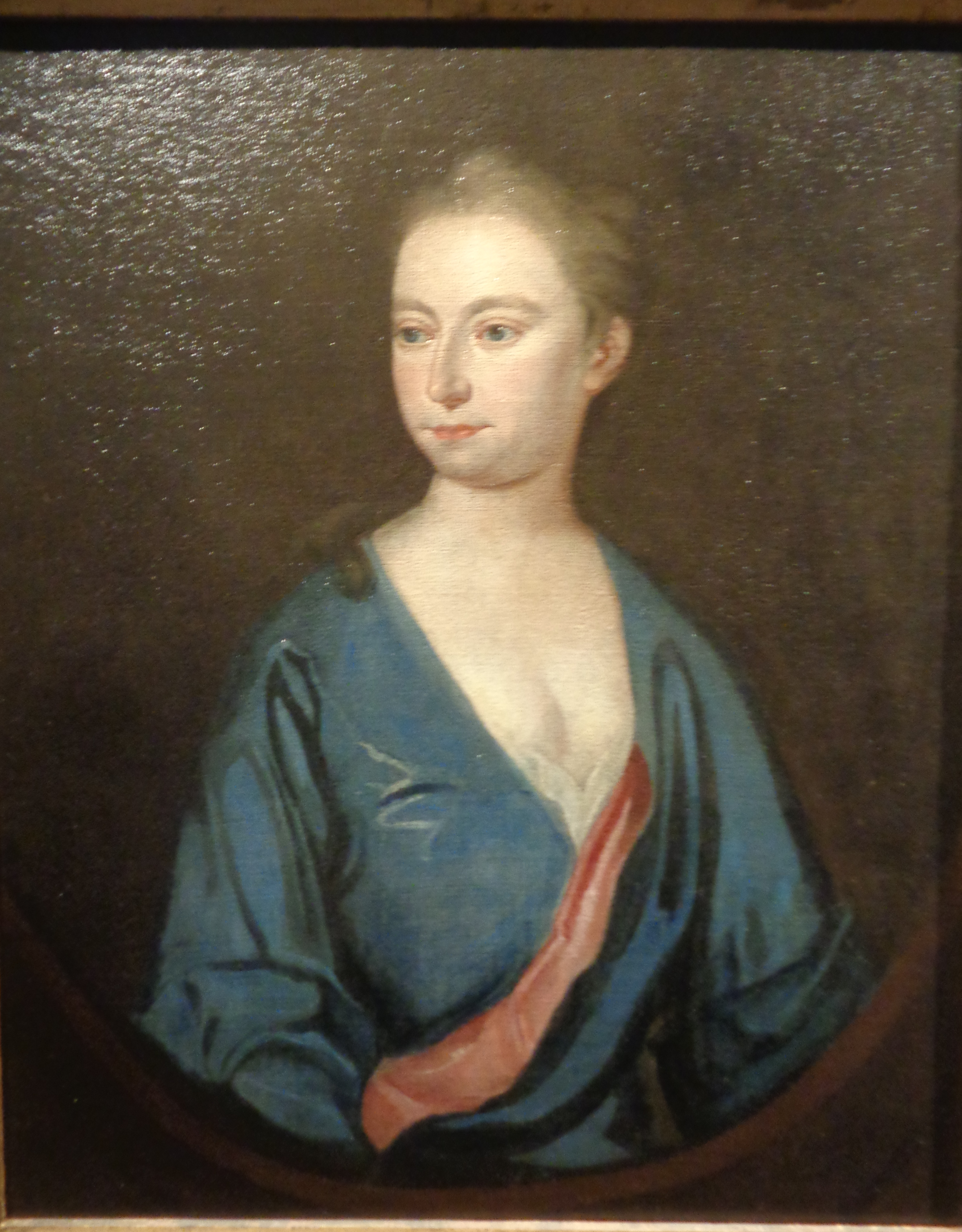
Portrait of Lee's wife Hannah

Lee thought that marriage was not only important between two individuals but for their families. A nephew of his later said, "Our Late Hon[ora]ble & worthy Unkle Presid[ent] Lee said that the first fall & ruin of families and estates were mostly Occasioned by Imprudent Matches to Imbeggar families and estates & to beget a race of beggars." He was engaged to Jenny Wilson in 1716. That year he returned to England to formalize the lease to the plantation before he married. Before his return, Jenny Wilson had found another husband, James Roscoe. Lee learned this from William Byrd.

In May 1722, Thomas Lee married Hannah Harrison Ludwell (December 5, 1701 – January 25, 1750), a member of the prominent Harrison family of Virginia, at Green Spring Plantation, James City County, Virginia. The marriage lasted his life and brought him increased wealth and status. Hannah was the daughter of Philip Ludwell II of Green Spring, and Hannah Harrison. The couple had eleven children; eight survived to adulthood:

- Richard Lee (b. 1723)
- Philip Ludwell Lee (February 24, 1726 – February 21, 1775)
- John Lee (b. 1728 d. 1782)
- Hannah Ludwell Lee Corbin (February 1729 – 1782)
- Thomas Ludwell Lee (December 13, 1730 – April 13, 1778); a member of the Virginia Delegates and editor of the Virginia Declaration of Rights.
- Richard Henry Lee (January 20, 1732 – January 19, 1794); signer of the United States Declaration of Independence
- Francis Lightfoot Lee (October 14, 1734 – January 11, 1797); signer of the United States Declaration of Independence. Married Rebecca Tayloe, daughter of John Tayloe II of Mount Airy. Tayloe built Menokin for his daughter and her new husband.
- Alice Lee (June 4, 1736 – March 25, 1817)
- William Lee (August 31, 1737 – June 27, 1795)
- James Lee (b. and d. 1739)
- Arthur Lee (December 21, 1740 – December 12, 1792)

1728 was a tragic year for Lee and his family. On January 29, thieves broke into the house, stealing the Lee family plate, jewelry, and other articles of value, and upon leaving, set fire to the plantation house at Machodoc. The fire destroyed the entire plantation, including Thomas' office, the barns, and the outhouses. Almost all of the Lees' possessions were destroyed, as well as up to 10,000 pounds in cash (equal to £1,559,186 today). The house quickly burned, and Hannah Lee, pregnant with her fourth child, had to be thrown from her chamber window on the second floor. This resulted in Hannah's miscarriage of a son (they named him John). Also injured in the fire was a young enslaved girl who died of her wounds. Virginia Governor William Gooch blamed transported convicts for the crime. It is said that Col. Lee's loss was not less than 50,000 pounds (equal to £7,795,928 today). British officials later gave Lee 300 pounds (equal to £46,776 today) as compensation, and Queen Caroline also gave him money from her private purse to help finance the rebuilding. The convicts and an accomplice were later found guilty. Their punishment is unknown because the trial records were destroyed. When construction began on the new Lee mansion, the family stayed with Thomas's brother Henry at Lee Hall. Lee sold the "Machodoc" estate to Richard Lee III's son, George Lee, who built "Mount Pleasant".

Lee's political career required trips to Williamsburg, causing him to be away from his family for extended periods. Lee managed to make the 80-mile (130-km) journey to his family and to be with his wife at the births of each of their children. Several of the sons became high-ranking political figures and were active in the American Revolutionary War and post-war politics. Richard Henry was a senator from Virginia to the United States Senate, and Francis Lightfoot was in the Virginia Senate. Lee's youngest sons William Lee and Arthur Lee served as diplomats to various European nations. William, along with Jan de Neufville, drafted an unofficial treaty between the United States and the Dutch Republic which Great Britain used as a casus belli for the Fourth Anglo-Dutch War.

=== Ohio Company ===
Lee was appointed commissioner, along with William Beverley, to negotiate with the Six Nations of the Iroquois at the Treaty of Lancaster in 1744. At the treaty, an agreement was made with the Six Nations for 400 pounds (equal to £86,061 today) in return for the right for Virginians to travel through and settle in the Shenandoah Valley.

In 1747, Lee co-founded the Ohio Company of Virginia along with Lawrence Washington, Augustine Washington Jr., the Duke of Bedford, and John Hanbury. The Ohio Company was a land speculation venture which helped colonize the Ohio Country. Lee's influence as a member of the Governor's Council helped lead to the success of the Ohio Company, and within seven years, the company had 100 families living in Ohio. He was also the company's first president and, after Lee died, was succeeded by Lawrence Washington.

=== Stratford Hall ===
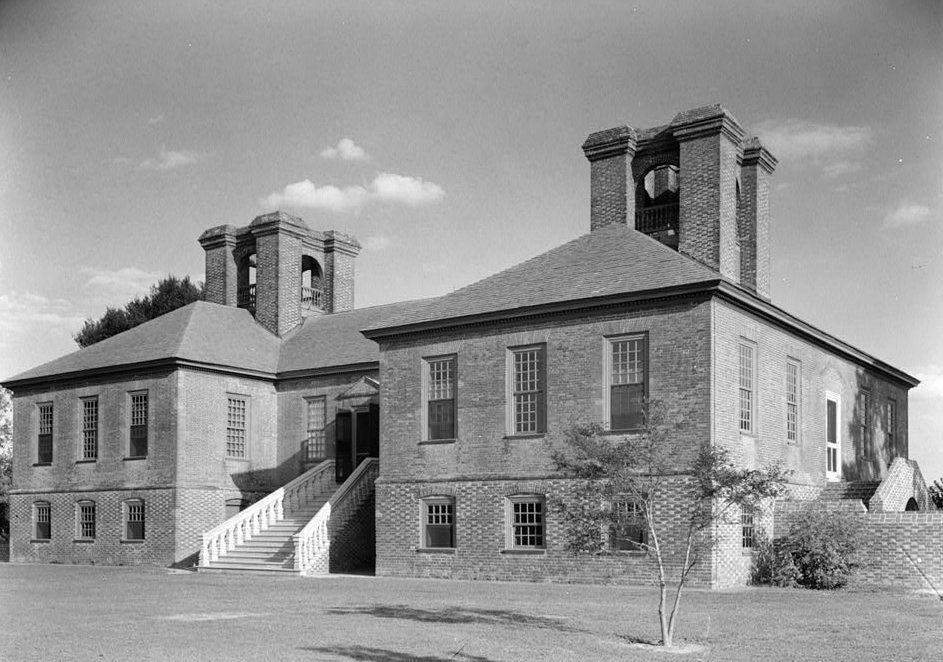
Stratford Hall Plantation, built by Thomas Lee

With Lee's higher rank in society and wealth, he decided he needed to build a mansion to secure his position as one of the Virginia gentry. he chose the "Clifts," which he had owned since the mid-1710s. Lee decided on this site because it was located in Westmoreland County, where he was born, and because it was located on the Potomac River. The land was sufficient for many construction laborers to live there. Hannah had an influential say in designing and planning the house's interior. Philip, the couple's eldest son, had said, "See what it is to be ruled by a woman. I should have been now living in a house like this ... had not my father been persuaded by his wife to put up this very inferior dwelling, now over my head." The exact construction date of the house is unknown, but it is estimated that construction began around 1725–30, as all of Lee's sons were born at Stratford. Workers on the plantation were from all the working class: free people and indentured servants (mostly from Europe), and enslaved people.

Between 1719 and 1746, Lee acquired vast holdings in what are now Fairfax, Fauquier, Prince William, and Loudoun counties. The town of Leesburg, was named in his honor as recommended by his two sons, the founders and trustees.

== Later years, death and legacy ==
Hannah Harrison died at "Stratford" on January 25, 1749, having borne eleven children. She was buried in the old family burying ground, called the "Burnt House Fields", at "Mount Pleasant". Her tombstone was later removed to "Stratford Hall", probably by Henry Lee, who built the new vault at that place. On November 14, 1750, Thomas Lee died at age sixty and was buried in the old "Burnt House Fields" at Mount Pleasant. According to his will, he wished to be buried in between his wife and his mother. He bequeathed Stratford Hall to his eldest son, Philip Ludwell Lee, and the Machodoc plantation to his nephew, George Lee.

== Notes ==
Government offices
Preceded by John Robinson	Colonial Governor of Virginia; 1749–1750	Succeeded by Lewis Burwell
