= Lee family =

American political family

Lee
- Current region: Virginia, Maryland, North Carolina, Pennsylvania, Washington, D.C., Florida
- Origin: England
- Members: Thomas Lee, Francis Lightfoot Lee, Richard Henry Lee, Henry Lee III, Thomas Sim Lee, Robert E. Lee
- Estate: Stratford Hall

The Lee family of the United States is a historically significant Virginia and Maryland political family, whose many prominent members are known for their accomplishments in politics and the military. The family became prominent when Richard Lee I ("The Immigrant") immigrated to the English Colony of Virginia in 1639 and made his fortune managing a tobacco plantation worked by enslaved Africans.

Members of the family include Thomas Lee (1690–1750), a founder of the Ohio Company and a member of the Virginia House of Burgesses; Francis Lightfoot Lee (1734–1797) and Richard Henry Lee (1732–1794), signers of the American Declaration of Independence, with Richard Lee also serving as one of Virginia's inaugural U.S. Senators; Henry "Light-Horse Harry" Lee (1756–1818), lieutenant colonel in the Continental Army and Governor of Virginia; Thomas Sim Lee (1745–1819), Governor of Maryland and lastly, and most famous, General Robert E. Lee (1807–1870), commander of the Army of Northern Virginia of the Confederate States of America in the American Civil War (1861–1865). Twelfth President Zachary Taylor (1784–1850, served 1849–1850), and ninth Chief Justice Edward Douglass White (1845–1921, served 1894–1921) were also descendants of Richard Lee I. Confederate President Jefferson Davis married Sarah Knox Taylor, daughter of Zachary Taylor.

Most recently, family members have marked over two hundred years of political service in the United States, as Blair Lee III (1916–1985), a descendant of Richard Henry Lee, served as the second Lieutenant Governor of Maryland when the office was revived, from 1971 to 1979 and Acting Governor of Maryland from 1977 to 1979. Charles Carter Lee, a descendant of Henry Lee III and a Superior Court Judge in Los Angeles County, California was named the U.S. team's Chef de Mission by the United States Olympic Committee for the 2008 Beijing Summer Olympics.

The Society of the Lees of Virginia, composed of descendants of Richard Lee I, was organised in 1921 and supports research on the family and preservation of associated historical sites.

== History ==
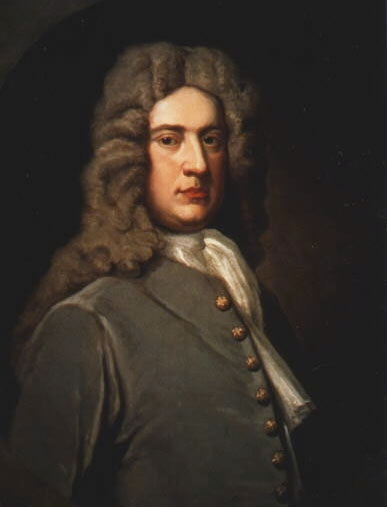
Richard Lee I, founder of the family in North America

Richard Lee asserted descent from the Lees of Shropshire and bore a coat of arms which was confirmed in 1660/1 by John Gibbon, Bluemantle Pursuivant of the College of Arms. In 1988, a study by William Thorndale was published in the National Genealogical Society Quarterly, asserting that Richard Lee I was actually the son of John Lee, a clothier, and his wife Jane Hancock; that Richard had been born not at Coton Hall in Shropshire, but in Worcester (some distance down the River Severn); and that several of their immediate relatives had been apprenticed as vintners. The question, then, has been 'how did Richard Lee descend from the family with whom he shared a coat of arms?' The book Collections for the Ancestry of Colonel Richard Lee, Virginia Emigrant, by English genealogist Alan Nicholls presents evidence for the English ancestry of Colonel Richard Lee using contemporary documents, transcribing records left by Richard Lee, his family, and their associates. His research, using original source documents, shows that some of William Thorndale's conclusions were likely based upon prior transcription errors. His work also looks at the records left by the Shropshire and Worcester Lee families. A great-uncle may have been Richard Lee, who was called 'Richard Lee, Gent' buried at Coton Hall's Alveley Parish in 1613.

=== Colonial Virginia ===
In the Thirteen Colonies destined to declare independence from British North America and become the United States, the family began when Richard Lee I immigrated to the Colony of Virginia and made his fortune in the cultivation of tobacco. His son Richard Lee II married Laetitia Corbin, daughter of The Hon. Henry Corbin of Rappahannock County, was a member of the House of Burgesses and later King's Council. His son, Richard Lee III, was a cotton broker in London for the family and leased to his brothers Thomas and Henry the plantation he inherited from his father, "Machodoc," for "an annual rent of one peppercorn only, payable on Christmas Day". The Lees first gained wider significance with the aforementioned Thomas Lee (1690–1750). He became a member of the House of Burgesses and later went on to found the Ohio Company, and was the co-executor of his uncle, John Tayloe I's, estate, what became Mount Airy.

=== Revolutionary War era ===
General Henry Lee III, "Light Horse Harry," Governor of Virginia

Thomas Lee (1690–1750) married Hannah Harrison Ludwell: their children, like the descendants of Thomas Lee's brother Henry Lee I (1691–1747), included a number of prominent Revolutionary War and pre-Revolution political figures.

Thomas and Hannah Lee's two eldest children were Philip Ludwell Lee (1726–1775) and Hannah Lee (1728–1782).

Thomas Ludwell Lee (1730–1778) was a member of the Virginia Delegates and a major editor of George Mason's Virginia Declaration of Rights (1776), a precursor to the United States Declaration of Independence, which was signed by his brothers Richard Henry Lee (1732–1794) and Francis Lightfoot Lee (1734–1797).

Richard Henry Lee was a delegate to Continental Congress from Virginia and president of that body, 1774, later serving as president of the Continental Congress under the Articles of Confederation, and United States Senator from Virginia (1789–1792) under the new United States Constitution.

Younger siblings included Alice Lee (1736–1818), who married American Chief Physician William Shippen, Jr. and diplomats William Lee (b. 1739, d. 1795) and Arthur Lee (b. 1740, d. 1792).

Henry Lee's grandson, Henry Lee III (1756–1818), known as "Light Horse Harry," was a Princeton graduate who served with great distinction under General George Washington in the American Revolutionary War, and was the only officer below the rank of General to receive the "Gold Medal," awarded for his leadership at the Battle of Paulus Hook in New Jersey, on 19 August 1779. He was Governor of Virginia from 1791 to 1794. Among his nine children was Robert Edward Lee, later the famed Confederate general during the American Civil War.

Henry Lee III's brothers were the noted Richard Bland Lee, a three-term U.S. Congressman from Virginia, and Charles Lee (1758–1815), Attorney General of the United States from 1795 to 1801.

Thomas Sim Lee, a second cousin of Henry Lee III, was elected Governor of Maryland in 1779 and 1792 and declined a third term in 1798. Born in the Province of Maryland in 1745, he played an important part in the birth of Maryland as a state and in the birth of the United States of America as a nation. A great-grandson of Thomas Sim Lee was John Lee Carroll, the 37th Governor of Maryland.

=== Civil War era ===
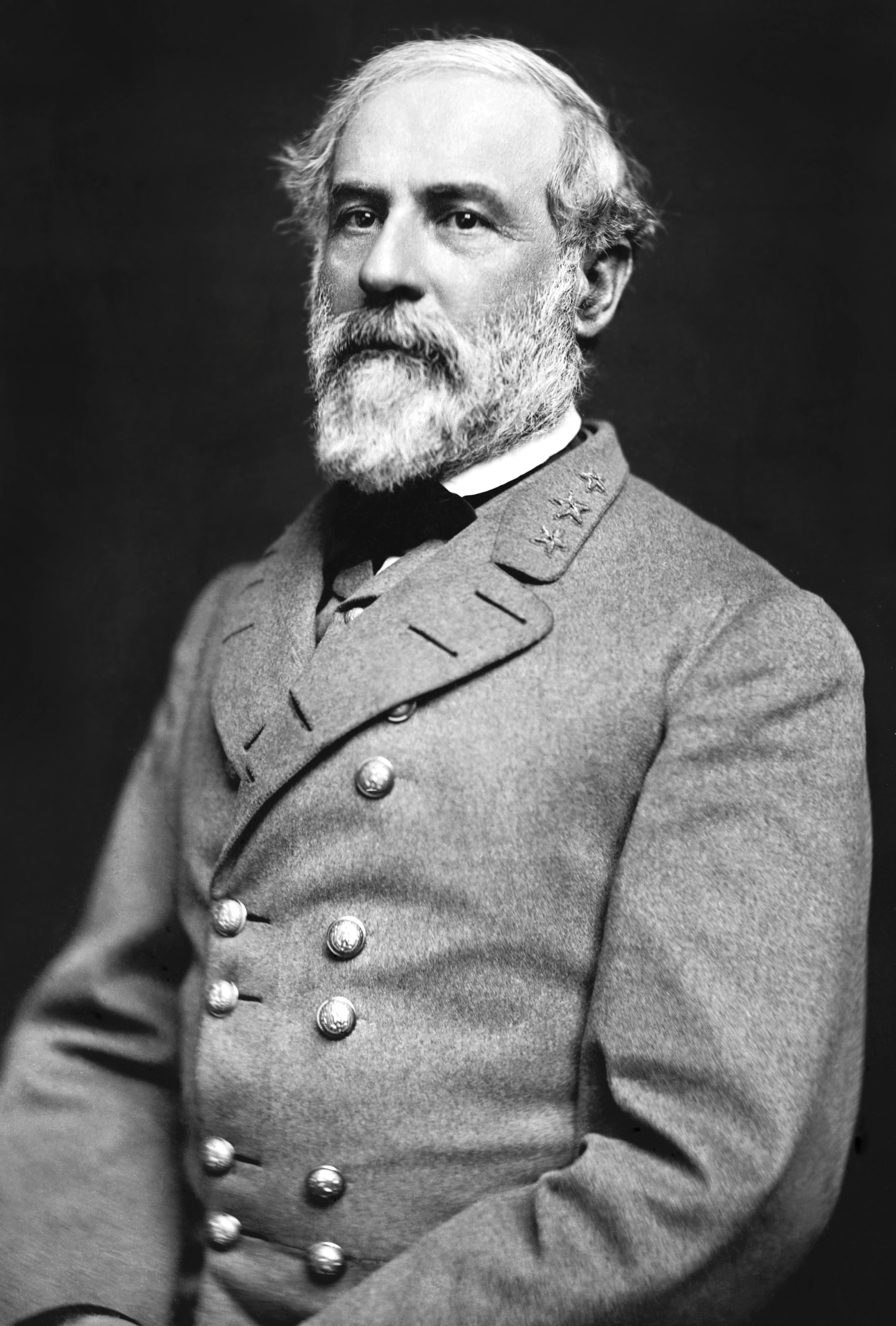
Confederate general Robert E. Lee

Robert E. Lee (1807–1870) was the son of Henry Lee III, and probably the most famous member of the Lee family. He served as Confederate general in the United States Civil War and later as President of Washington and Lee University, which was named for him and for George Washington. Washington and Lee University houses Lee Chapel, burial site of several members of the Lee family. Stratford Hall, a Lee family estate and birthplace of Robert E. Lee, houses the Lee Family Digital Archive. He was married to Mary Anna Randolph Custis, who was a granddaughter of Martha Washington and also was Lee's third cousin once removed through Richard Lee II, fourth cousin through William Randolph, and third cousin through Robert Carter I. R. E. Lee's children were George Washington Custis Lee, Mary Custis Lee, Robert E. Lee Jr., Anne Carter Lee, Mildred Childe Lee, Eleanor Agnes Lee, and William H. Fitzhugh Lee.

Other Lee relations who were general officers during the Civil War were Fitzhugh Lee (C.S.A.), Samuel Phillips Lee (U.S. Navy); Richard Lucian Page (Confederate States and Navy); Edwin Gray Lee (C.S.A.) and Richard L. T. Beale (C.S.A.). Indirect relations of R.E.Lee who were Confederate general officers included William N. Pendleton and Virginia Military Institute graduate William H. F. Payne. Two other civil war generals who were related to Lee were George B. Crittenden (C.S.A.) and Thomas Leonidas Crittenden (U.S.); their sister was the author Ann Mary Butler Crittenden Coleman; and their mother was Sarah O. Lee a great-great-granddaughter of Richard Lee I "the Founder". A son of Thomas L. Crittenden, John Jordan Crittenden III, died at the Battle of Little Bighorn in 1876. Another distant Lee relation was U.S. Admiral Willis A. Lee of Kentucky.

"Bedford", the Jefferson County home of his cousin Edmund J. Lee Jr. (1797–1877), son of Edmund Jennings Lee I, was burned in July 1864, along with others of Confederate sympathizers in what became the Eastern Panhandle of West Virginia.

=== 20th and 21st centuries ===
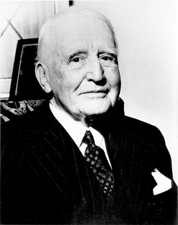
Blair Lee (1857–1944), US senator from Maryland

Francis Preston Blair Lee (1857–1944) was a Democratic member of the United States Senate, representing the State of Maryland from 1914 to 1917. He was also the great-grandson of American patriot Richard Henry Lee, father of E. Brooke Lee comptroller of Maryland and "Father of Silver Spring" and grandfather of Blair Lee III, Lieutenant Governor of Maryland from 1971 to 1979 and Acting Governor of Maryland from 1977 to 1979.

Judge Charles Carter Lee, a direct descendant of Henry Lee III, was selected to represent the United States at the 2008 Olympic Games as the United States Olympic Committee's Chef de Mission. Judge Lee, a Los Angeles County Superior Court Judge since 1989, was also involved with the 1984 Summer Olympics as he headed a delegation sent to China after the Soviet Union announced a plan to boycott the Olympics in Los Angeles. These talks concluded with China's formal agreement in writing to participate in the 1984 Olympics.

== Gallery ==
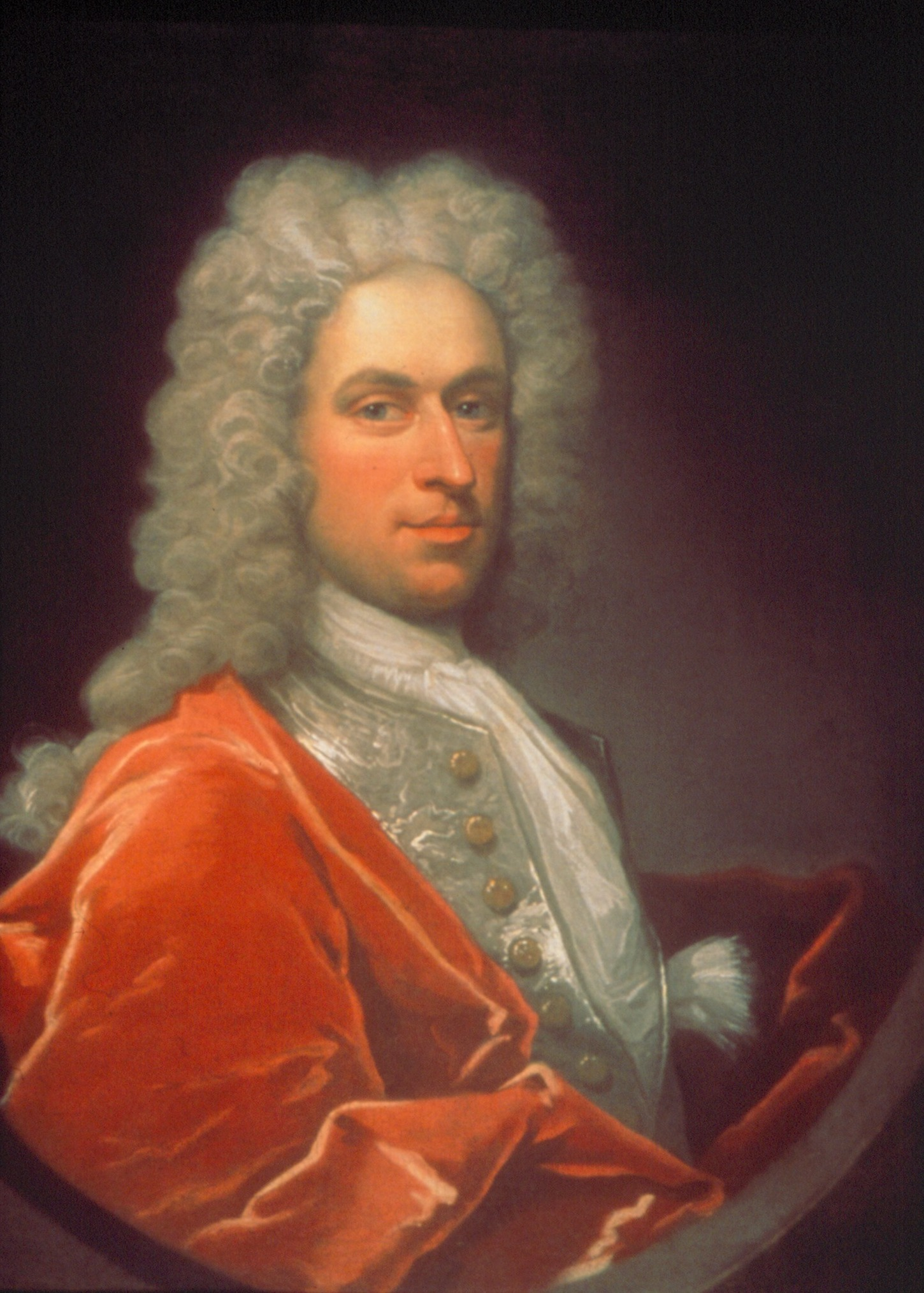
Thomas Lee (1690–1750), Virginia colonist and cofounder of the Ohio Company

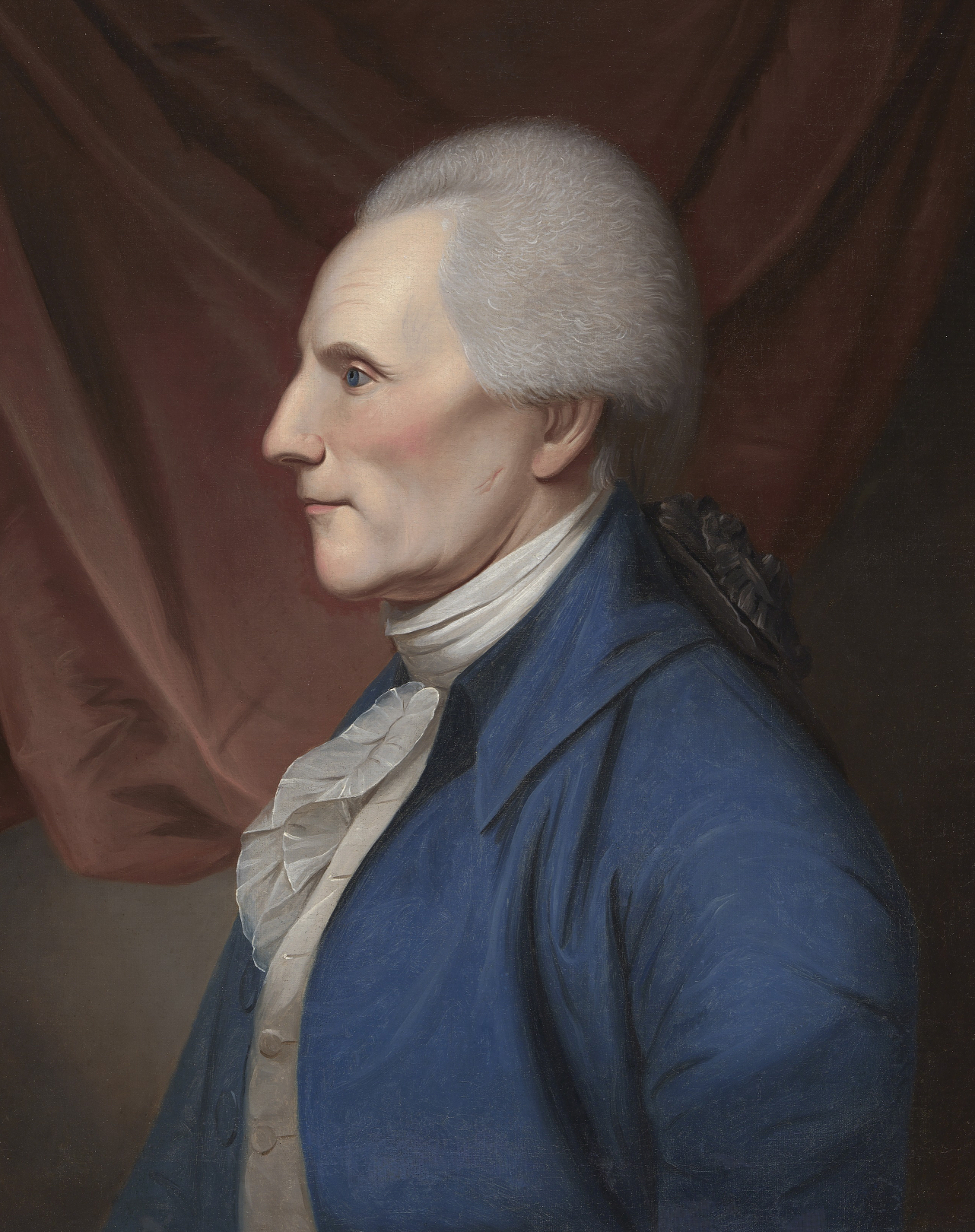
Richard Henry Lee (1732–1794), signer of the United States Declaration of Independence and president of the Continental Congress

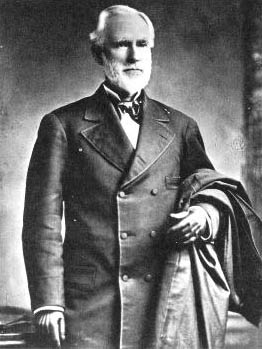
Richard Lucian Page, Brigadier General in the Confederate States Army

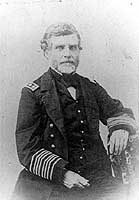
Samuel Phillips Lee, United States Navy Rear Admiral

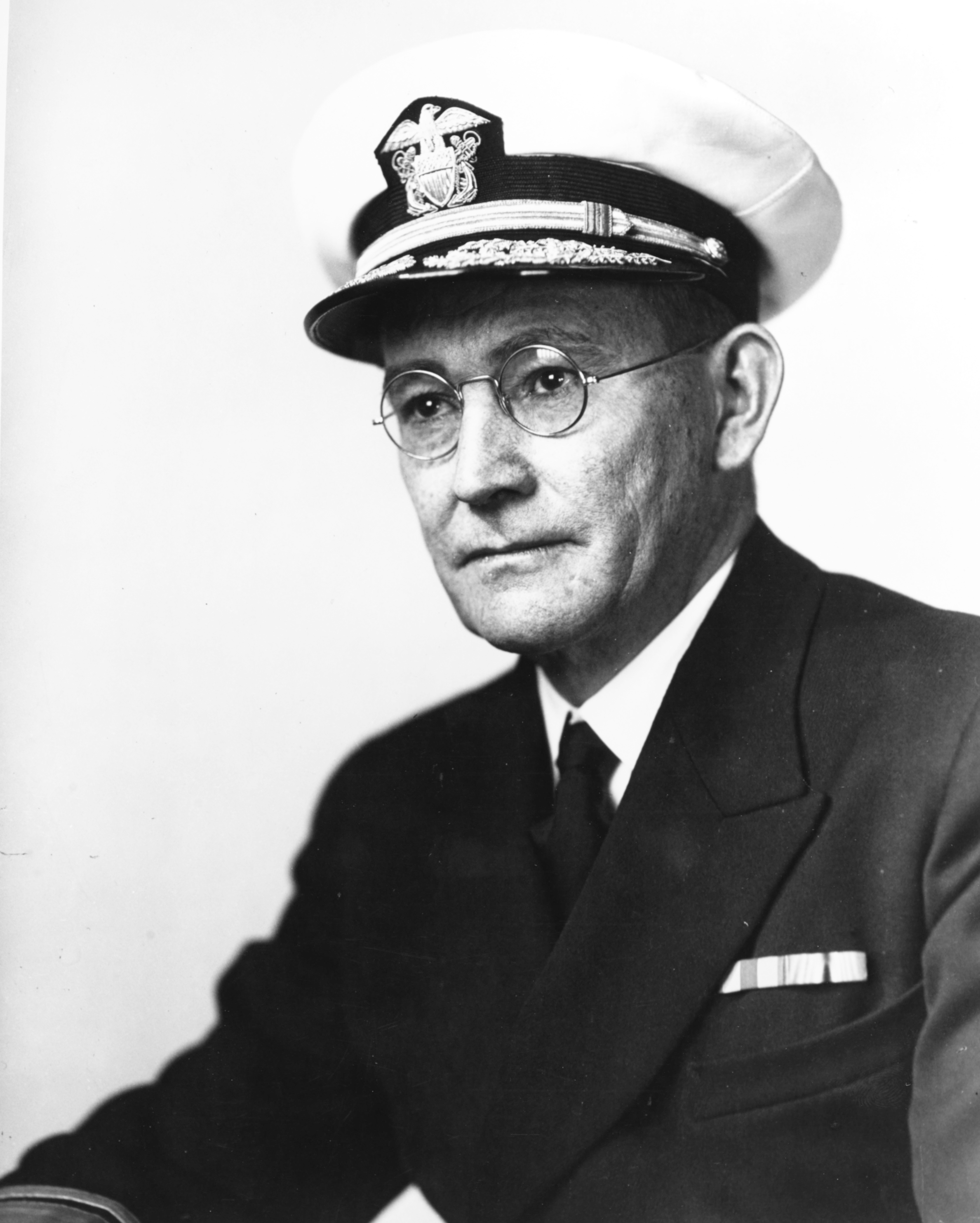
Rear Admiral Willis A. Lee, Jr., USN; circa 1942.

== The Society of the Lees of Virginia ==
The Society of the Lees of Virginia, organized in 1921, is composed of descendants of the Lee family's original Jamestown immigrants, Richard Lee I and his wife, Ann Constable. The Society is actively involved in many endeavors consistent with its ongoing mission, including:

- Helping to coordinate and promote an up-to-date contextual understanding of the family derived from archeological, genealogical, and historical research;
- Curating the Lee Family Digital Archive, a central repository of Lee family papers and secondary sources;
- Preserving and interpreting sites of historical importance such as gravesites, Stratford Hall and the Lee–Fendell House;
- Reuniting family members through its annual meeting and other events.

== Family tree ==
Below is a list of notable members of the Lee family, beginning with Virginia Governor Thomas Lee and Henry Lee:

Partial Lee family tree
- Richard Lee II (1647–1714),
  - Henry Lee I (1691–1747), ∞ 1722 : Mary Bland (1704–1764)
    - Richard Lee (1726–1795), ∞ 1786 : Sarah Bland Poythress (1768–1828)
    - Henry Giles Lee II (1730–1787), ∞ 1753 : Lucy Ludwell Grymes (1734–1792)
      - Henry Lee III, 9th Governor of Virginia (1756–1818), ∞ 1782 : Matilda Ludwell Lee (1764–1790); ∞ 1793 : Anne Hill Carter (1773–1829)
        - Lucy Grymes Lee (1786–1860), ∞ 1802 : Bernard Moore Carter (1780–1842)
          - Charles Henry Carter (1804–1872), ∞ 1830 : Rosalie Eugenia Calvert (1806–1845)
            - Alice Carter (born 1832), ∞ 1851 : Oden Bowie, 34th Governor of Maryland (1826–1894)
              - Annette Carter Bowie (born 1863), ∞ 1884 : Eugene Roberts (born 1859)
                - Eugene Bowie Roberts (1898–1983), ∞ 1933 : Countess Cornelia Széchényi (1908–1958)
                  - Cornelia Carter Roberts (1936–1982), ∞ 1969 : Count Hans-Heinrich Richard Gerolf Karl Urban Maria Omnes Sancti von Coudenhove-Kalergi (1926–2004)
                    - Count Dominik Cornelius Valentin Gerolf Eugene von Coudenhove-Kalergi (b 1973), ∞ 2009 : Princess Adelheid Marie Beatrice Zita von Liechtenstein (born 1981)
            - Bernard Carter (1834–1912), ∞ 1858 : Mary Buckner Ridgely (1834–1894)
              - John Ridgely Carter (1864–1944), ∞ 1887 : Alice Morgan (1865–1933)
                - Caroline Mildred Carter (1888–1965), ∞ 1910 (div 1928) : Archibald Charles Montagu Brabazon Acheson, 5th Earl of Gosford (1877–1954)
                  - Archibald Alexander John Stanley Acheson, 6th Earl of Gosford (1911–1966), ∞ 1935 (div 1960) : Francesca Augusta Maria Cagiati (1912–2009); ∞ 1960 : Cynthia Margaret Cave (1911–2015)
                    - Charles David Alexander John Sparrow Acheson, 7th Earl of Gosford (born 1942)
                  - Lady Mildred Camilla Nichola Acheson (1917–1988), ∞ 1937 (div 1949) : Hans-Christoph Schenk Freiherr von Stauffenberg (1911–2005); ∞ 1950 : Axel Ernst-August Clamor Franz Albrecht Erich Leo Freiherr von dem Bussche-Streithorst (1919–1993)
                  - Lady Mary Virginia Shirley Acheson (1919–1996), ∞ 1941 : Fernando Corcuera y Mier (1914–1978)
                    - Jaime Corcuera y Acheson (born 1955), ∞ 1983 : Archduchess Myriam of Austria (born 1959)
        - Henry Lee IV (1787–1837), ∞ 1817 : Anne Robinson McCarty (1798–1840)
        - Sydney Smith Lee (1802–1869), ∞ 1834 : Anna Maria Mason (1811–1898)
          - Fitzhugh Lee, 40th Governor of Virginia (1835–1905)
        - Robert Edward Lee (1807–1870), ∞ 1831 : Mary Anna Randolph Custis (1808–1873)
          - George Washington Custis Lee (1832–1913)
          - Mary Custis Lee (1835–1918)
          - William Henry Fitzhugh Lee (1837–1891), ∞ 1859 : Charlotte Georgiana Wickham (1841–1863); ∞ 1867 : Mary Tabb Bolling (1846–1924)
          - Anne Carter Lee (1839–1862)
          - Eleanor Agnes Lee (1841–1873)
          - Robert Edward Lee, Jr. (1843–1914), ∞ 1871 : Charlotte Haxall (1848–1872); ∞ 1894 : Juliet Carter (1860–1915)
          - Mildred Childe Lee (1846–1905)
      - Charles Lee (1758–1815), ∞ 1789 : Anne Lee (1770–1804); ∞ 1809 : Margaret Christian Scott (1783–1843)
      - Richard Bland Lee I (1761–1827), ∞ 1794 : Elizabeth Collins (1768–1858), owner of Sully
        - Ann Matilda Lee (1799–1880), ∞ : Bailey Washington III (1787–1854)
          - Euphan Wallace Washington (1831–1918), ∞ 1856 : Pierson Barton Reading (1816–1868)
          - Anna Louisa Washington (1836–1885), ∞ 1862 : Walter Dorsey Davidge (1823–1901)
            - William Fendall Davidge (1871–1941), ∞ 1896 : Estelle Courtenay Washington (1875–1942)
              - Courtenay Washington Davidge (1896–1960), ∞ 1922 : Lamont Waltman Marvin (1896–1971)
                - Lee Marvin (1924–1987), actor
        - Zaccheus Collins Lee (1805–1859), ∞ 1837 : Martha Ann Jenkins (1819–1864)
      - Mary Lee (1764–1827), ∞ 1791 : Philip Richard Fendall I (1734–1805), owner of Lee-Fendall House
        - Philip Richard Fendall II (1794–1868), ∞ 1827 : Elizabeth Mary Young (1804–1859)
          - Philip Richard Fendall III (1832–1879), ∞ : Anne Catherine Tredick (born 1836)
            - Marian Fendall (1870–1949), ∞ 1895 : Jacob Wendell III (1869–1911)
              - Anne Catherine Tredick Wendell (1900–1977), ∞ 1922 (div 1936) : Henry George Alfred Marius Victor Francis Herbert, 6th Earl of Carnarvon (1898–1987); ∞ : Geoffrey Seymour Grenfell (1898–1940)
                - Henry George Reginald Molyneux Herbert, 7th Earl of Carnarvon (1924–2001), ∞ 1956 : Jean Margaret Wallop, owner of Highclere Castle
                  - George Reginald Oliver Molyneux Herbert, 8th Earl of Carnarvon (born 1956), ∞ 1989 (div 1998) : Jayne Wilby; ∞ 1999 : Fiona Aitken, owner of Highclere Castle
              - Philippa Fendall Wendell (1905–1974), ∞ 1924 : Randolph Algernon Ronald Stewart, 12th Earl of Galloway (1892–1978)
                - Antonia Marian Amy Isabel Stewart (1925–1971), ∞ : Charles Mark Dalrymple, 3rd Baronet (1915–1971)
                - Randolph Keith Reginald Stewart, 13th Earl of Galloway (1928–2020), ∞ 1975 : Lily May Budge (died 1999)
      - Edmund Jennings Lee I (1772–1843), ∞ 1796 : Sarah Caldwell Lee (1775–1837)
        - Edmund Jennings Lee II (1797–1877), ∞ : Henrietta Bedinger (1810–1898)
          - Edmund Jennings Lee III (1845–1896), ∞ 1876 : Rebecca Lawrence (died 1882)
            - Edmund Jennings Lee IV (1877–1962), ∞ 1911 : Lucy Chaplin (1884–1971)
              - Duncan Chaplin Lee (1913–1988)
        - Anne Harriotte Lee (1799–1863), ∞ 1820 : John Lloyd (1775–1854)
          - Anne Harriotte Lloyd (1826–1888), ∞ : John Stearns (1812–1864)
            - John Lloyd Stearns (born 1852), ∞ 1878 : Ella Powell (born 1856)
              - Robert Lawrence Stearns (1892–1977), ∞ 1920 : Amy Pitkin (1897–1985)
                - Marion Lloyd Stearns (1921–2009), ∞ 1946 : Byron Raymond White (1917–2002)
                  - Nancy Pitkin White (born 1958), ∞ 1985 : Peter Maxwell Lippe
      - Anne Lee (1776–1857), ∞ 1793 : William Byrd Page (1773–1818)
        - Richard Lucian Page (1807–1901)
  - Thomas Lee (1690–1750), Governor of Virginia Colony 1749–1750. Father of Richard Henry Lee, Francis Lightfoot Lee, and Arthur Lee.
    - Richard Henry Lee (1732–1794), Delegate to the Continental Congress from Virginia 1774, member of the Virginia Legislature 1777, U.S. Senator from Virginia 1789–1792. Son of Thomas Lee.
      - Francis Lightfoot Lee II (1782–1850), ∞ Jane Digges Fitzgerald (1789–1816).
        - Samuel Phillips Lee (1812–1897), ∞ Elizabeth Blair Lee (1818–1906).
          - Blair Lee I (1857–1944), Maryland State Senator 1906–1912, candidate for Governor of Maryland 1911, U.S. Senator from Maryland 1914–1917, delegate to the Democratic National Convention 1916. Great-grandson of Richard Henry Lee.
            - E. Brooke Lee, Comptroller of Maryland 1919–1923, Maryland Secretary of State 1923, delegate to the Democratic National Convention 1924 1940, Maryland House Delegate 1927, candidate for U.S. Representative from Maryland 1942. Son of Blair Lee.
              - Blair Lee III (1916–1985), delegate to the Democratic National Convention 1948 1960 1964 1972, Maryland House Delegate 1955–1962, Maryland State Senator 1967–1969, Maryland Secretary of State 1969–1971, Lieutenant Governor of Maryland 1971–1979, Governor of Maryland 1977–1979. Son of E. Brooke Lee.
              - E. Brooke Lee, Jr., delegate to the Democratic National Convention 1944. Son of E. Brooke Lee.
    - Francis Lightfoot Lee (1734–1797), Delegate to the Continental Congress from Virginia 1775, Virginia State Senator 1778, member of the Virginia Legislature 1780. Son of Thomas Lee.
    - Arthur Lee (1740–1792), member of the Virginia Legislature 1781, Delegate to the Continental Congress from Virginia 1782. Son of Thomas Lee.
- Hancock Lee ∞ Sarah Allerton
  - Elizabeth Lee ∞ Zachary Taylor
    - Richard Taylor (1744–1829), ∞ 1779 : Sarah Dabney Strother
      - Zachary Taylor (1784–1850), President of the United States 1849–1850. Second cousin once removed of Richard Henry Lee.
        - Sarah Knox Taylor (1814–1835), ∞ 1835 : Jefferson Davis (1808–1889), candidate for Mississippi State Representative 1843, U.S. Representative from Mississippi 1845–1846, U.S. Senator from Mississippi 1847-1851 1857–1861, candidate for Governor of Mississippi 1851, U.S. Secretary of War 1853–1857, President of the Confederate States 1861–1865.
        - Mary Elizabeth Bliss (1824–1909), ∞ 1848: William Wallace Smith Bliss (1815–1863), Secretary to the President of the United States
        - Richard Taylor (1826–1879), general
        - N. Taylor
          - N. N.
            - N. N.
              - N. N.
                - Victor Crist (1957-), Florida State Representative 1993–present. Descendant of Zachary Taylor.
      - Joseph Pannell Taylor (1796–1864), general
        - Sarah Taylor, ∞ David Rumph Jones (1825–1863), general
      - N. Taylor
        - N. Taylor
          - Edmund H. Taylor Jr. (1830–1923), Mayor of Frankfort, Kentucky 1871-1877 1881–1890; Kentucky State Senator 1902–1904. Grandnephew of Zachary Taylor.
    - N. Taylor
      - N. N.
        - N. N.
          - N. N.
            - Elliot Woolfolk Major (1864–1949), Missouri State Senator 1897–1901, Attorney General of Missouri 1909–1913, Governor of Missouri 1913–1917. First cousin thrice removed of Zachary Taylor and Second cousin thrice removed of James Madison.
          - N. N.
            - Edgar Bailey Woolfolk (1865–1956), member of the Missouri Legislature 1899–1901, Missouri State Court Judge 1913–1943. First cousin thrice removed of Zachary Taylor and Second cousin thrice removed of James Madison.

U.S. Representative David Dreier also has stated that he is a distant relative of Richard Bland Lee. Zachary Taylor was also nephew by marriage of Maryland House Delegates Benjamin Mackall IV and Thomas Mackall.

== See also ==
- First Families of Virginia
- Zachary Taylor
- Carroll family
