= Mount Pleasant (Hague, Virginia) =

Historic house in Virginia, United States

- U.S. National Register of Historic Places
- Virginia Landmarks Register
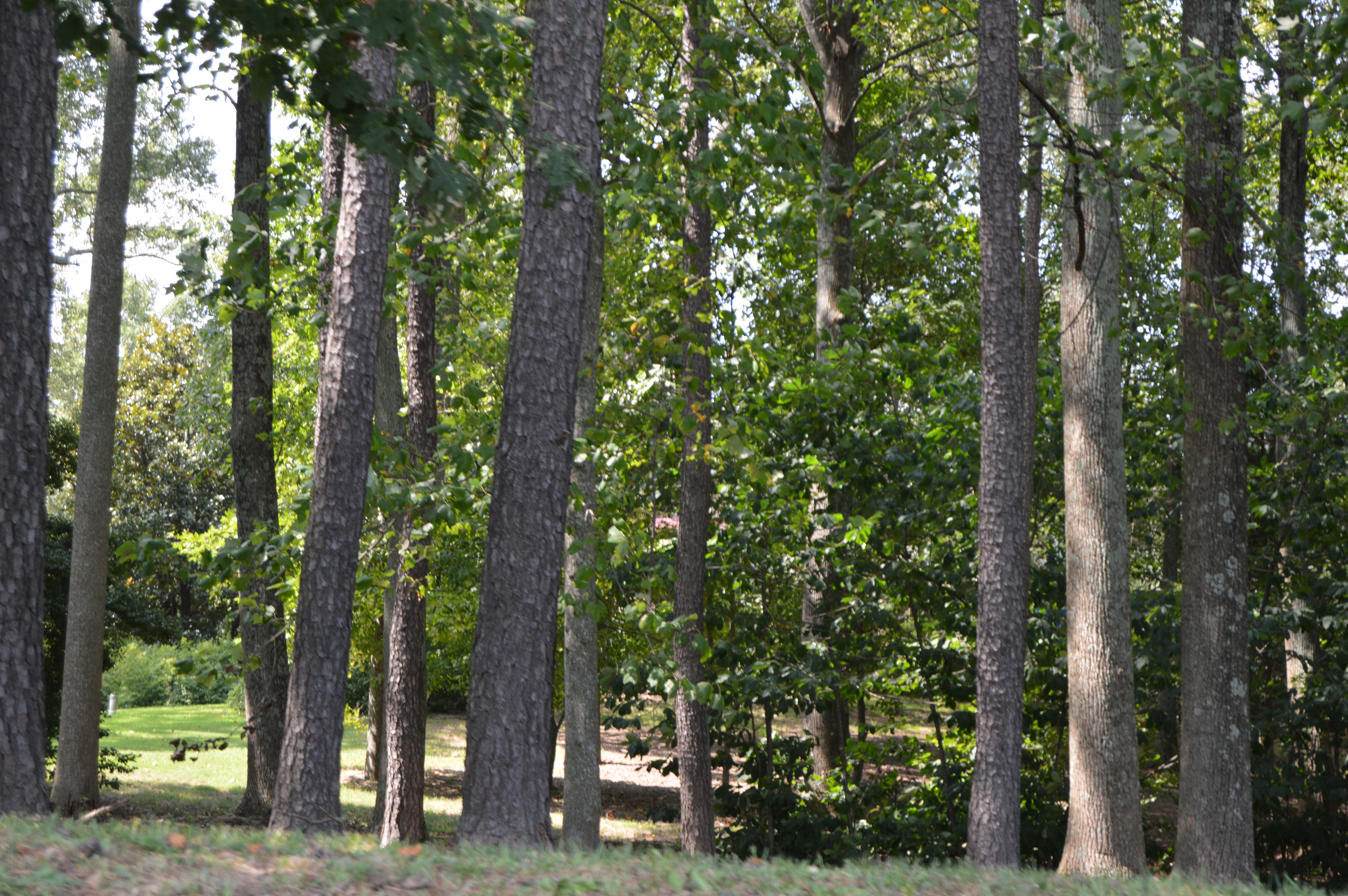
- Woods on the property

- Location within Virginia Location within the United States
- Location: 317 Coles Point Rd., Hague, Virginia, U.S.
- Coordinates: 38°04′34″N 76°38′36″W
- Area: 37.3 acres (15.1 ha)
- Built: 1887
- Architectural style: Queen Anne
- NRHP reference No.: 02001440
- VLR No.: 096-5003

Significant dates
- Added to NRHP: November 27, 2002
- Designated VLR: September 11, 2002

Mount Pleasant is a historic home located at Hague, Westmoreland County, Virginia. It was built in 1887.

Mount Pleasant is a three-story, Queen Anne style frame dwelling. It features a wraparound porch with turned posts and sawn brackets, four brick chimneys, and a central projecting tower with a pyramidal roof. Also on the property are a contributing smokehouse, a carriage barn, and a well house.

It was listed on the National Register of Historic Places in 2002.
