= Machodoc, Virginia =

Unincorporated community in Virginia, US

Coordinates: 38°04′49″N 76°41′48″W

Machodoc is an unincorporated community in Westmoreland County, in the U.S. state of Virginia.

== History ==
A post office called Machodoc was established in 1872, and remained in operation until it was discontinued in 1955. Machodoc is a name derived from a Native American language meaning "ceremonial river".
