= Stratford Hall (plantation) =

Historic plantation house in Virginia, United States

- U.S. National Register of Historic Places
- U.S. National Historic Landmark
- Virginia Landmarks Register
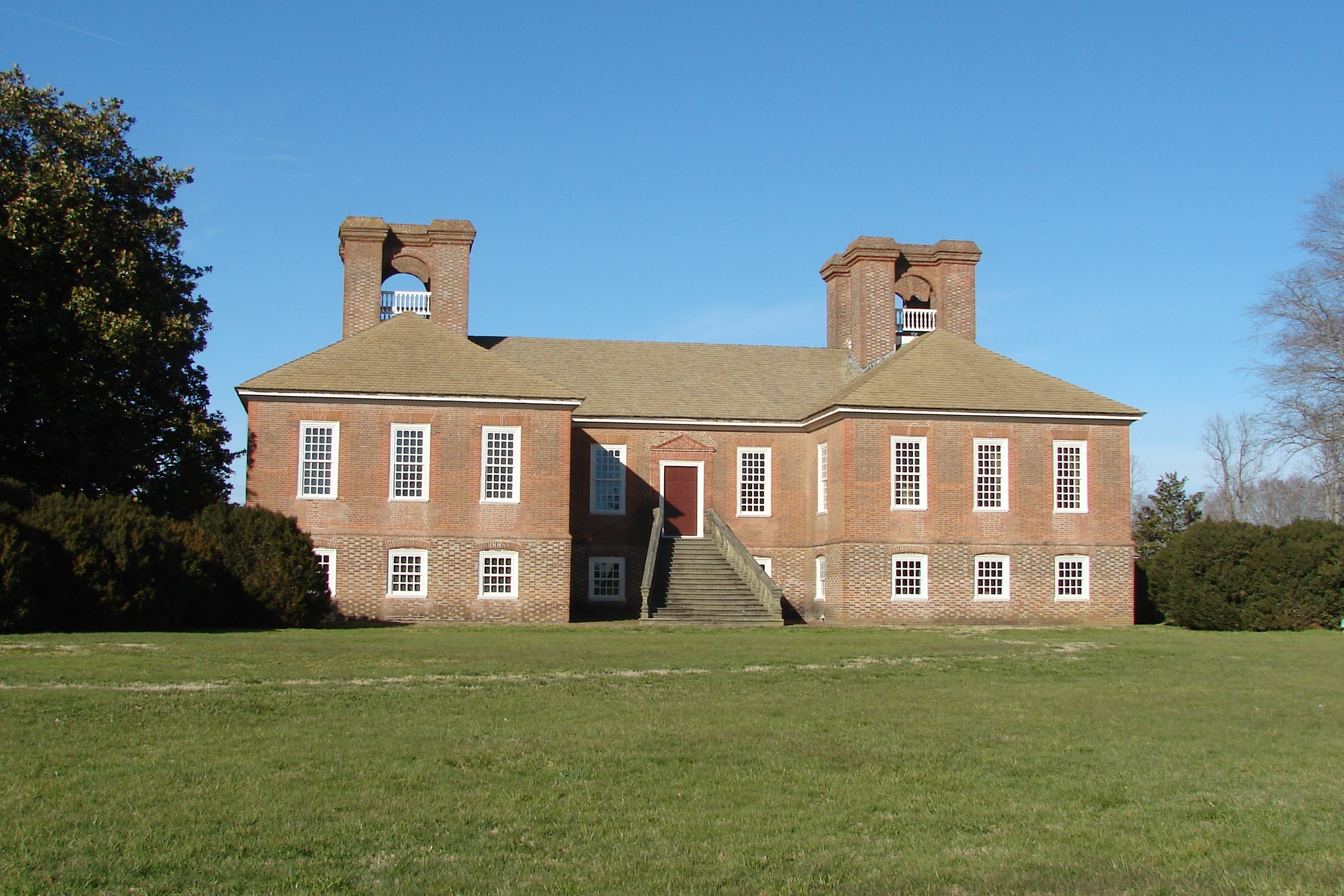
- Back side of Stratford in 2012

- Location within Virginia Location within the United States
- Coordinates: 38°9′7″N 76°50′22.2″W
- Built: 1738
- Architectural style: Georgian
- NRHP reference No.: 66000851
- VLR No.: 096-0024

Significant dates
- Added to NRHP: October 15, 1966
- Designated NHL: October 7, 1960
- Designated VLR: September 9, 1969

Stratford Hall is a historic house museum in Westmoreland County, Virginia, United States. It was the plantation house of four generations of the Lee family of Virginia (with descendants later to expand to Maryland and other states). Stratford Hall is the boyhood home of two Founding Fathers of the United States and signers of the United States Declaration of Independence, Richard Henry Lee (1732–1794), and Francis Lightfoot Lee (1734–1797). Stratford Hall is also the birthplace of Robert E. Lee (1807–1870), who was General in Chief of the Armies of the Confederate States during the American Civil War (1861–1865). The Stratford Hall estate was designated a National Historic Landmark in 1960, under the care of the National Park Service in the U.S. Department of the Interior.

== History ==
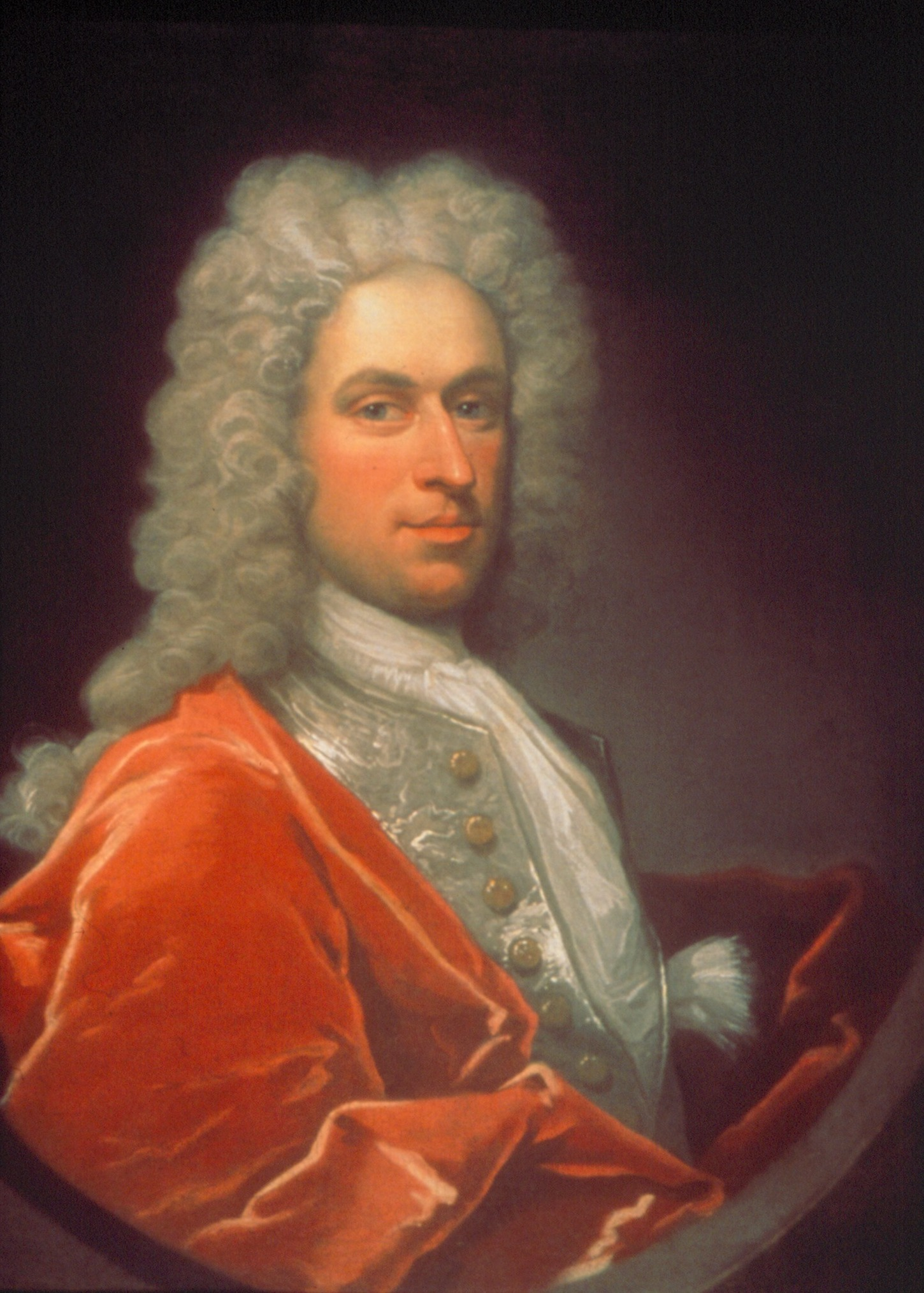
Thomas Lee, builder

Thomas Lee (1690–1750) was a Virginian who served as acting Governor of the colony and was a strong advocate for westward expansion. Lee purchased the land for Stratford Hall in 1717, aware of its agricultural and commercial potential as a waterfront site. Construction of the Georgian Great House did not begin until the late 1730s. Designed by an unknown architect, the brick Great House is a two-story H-shaped structure, surrounded on four corners by attending outbuildings, all of which still stand today. Following the construction of the Great House, Thomas Lee expanded the site into a bustling hive of activity, and soon the working plantation became "a towne in itself" as one visitor to Stratford marveled. By the time Stratford was completed around 1742, an estimated 200 enslaved Africans and African Americans were living at Stratford and other properties owned by Thomas Lee.

A wharf on the Potomac River was the destination for a large number of merchant ships, a grist mill ground wheat and corn there, and enslaved and indentured servants farmed tobacco and other crops on the thousands of acres of farmland. Blacksmiths, coopers, carpenters, tailors, gardeners, and weavers plied their trades at Thomas Lee's Stratford. Stratford Hall is set in the Historic Northern Neck of Virginia, a rural peninsula where historic Christ Church is located 50 miles southeast.

Amid this busy world, Thomas Lee and his wife Hannah Harrison Ludwell (1701–1749) raised eight children, six sons, and two daughters. They played important roles in shaping the early history of the nation. His eldest son, Philip Ludwell Lee Sr., Esquire (1727–1775), inherited Stratford Hall. Richard Henry Lee (1732–1794) and Francis Lightfoot Lee (1734–1797) were delegates from Virginia to the Second Continental Congress and signers of the United States Declaration of Independence. Richard Henry was later instrumental in guiding the fledgling nation, serving as President of the Continental Congress in 1784–85. Thomas Ludwell Lee, active in local politics, served as a Virginian legislator and helped compose the Virginia Declaration of Rights. William Lee (1739–1795) and Dr. Arthur Lee (1740–1792) were diplomats to Kingdom of Great Britain during the turbulent struggle for American independence. Hannah Lee was an early proponent of women's rights, and Alice Lee married the prominent physician William Shippen Jr. (1736–1808) of Philadelphia.

Philip Ludwell Lee Sr. (1727–1775), a member of the House of Burgesses and the King's Council, continued to expand the plantation after he inherited Stratford until it eventually encompassed almost 6,600 acres (27 km^{2}). A lover of horses and music, Philip and his wife Elizabeth Steptoe (1743–1789) had two daughters, the oldest of them known as the "divine Matilda". Philip died in 1775, and Elizabeth remarried in 1780 to Philip Richard Fendall I (1734–1805). The new couple continued to reside at Stratford Hall with her two daughters and her son-in-law (and later a hero of the Revolutionary War, Henry "Light Horse Harry" Lee (1756–1818), who had married her daughter Matilda. An arrangement was reached in 1784-1785 that the Fendalls would turn over their rights to Stratford Hall, and Henry would sell a one-half acre lot on Oronoco Street in Alexandria, Virginia for 300 pounds. There, Philip R. Fendall built the Lee-Fendall House. Matilda inherited Stratford Hall in this agreement and lived there with her husband Harry and her second cousin, but the couple's time together was cut short when Matilda died after eight years of marriage.

During this period, Caesar, an enslaved man, was a chef. He was noted for preparing hot chocolate for guests, as the hall had one of Virginia's first three chocolate grinding stones. His son Caesar Jr. was the plantation's postillion.

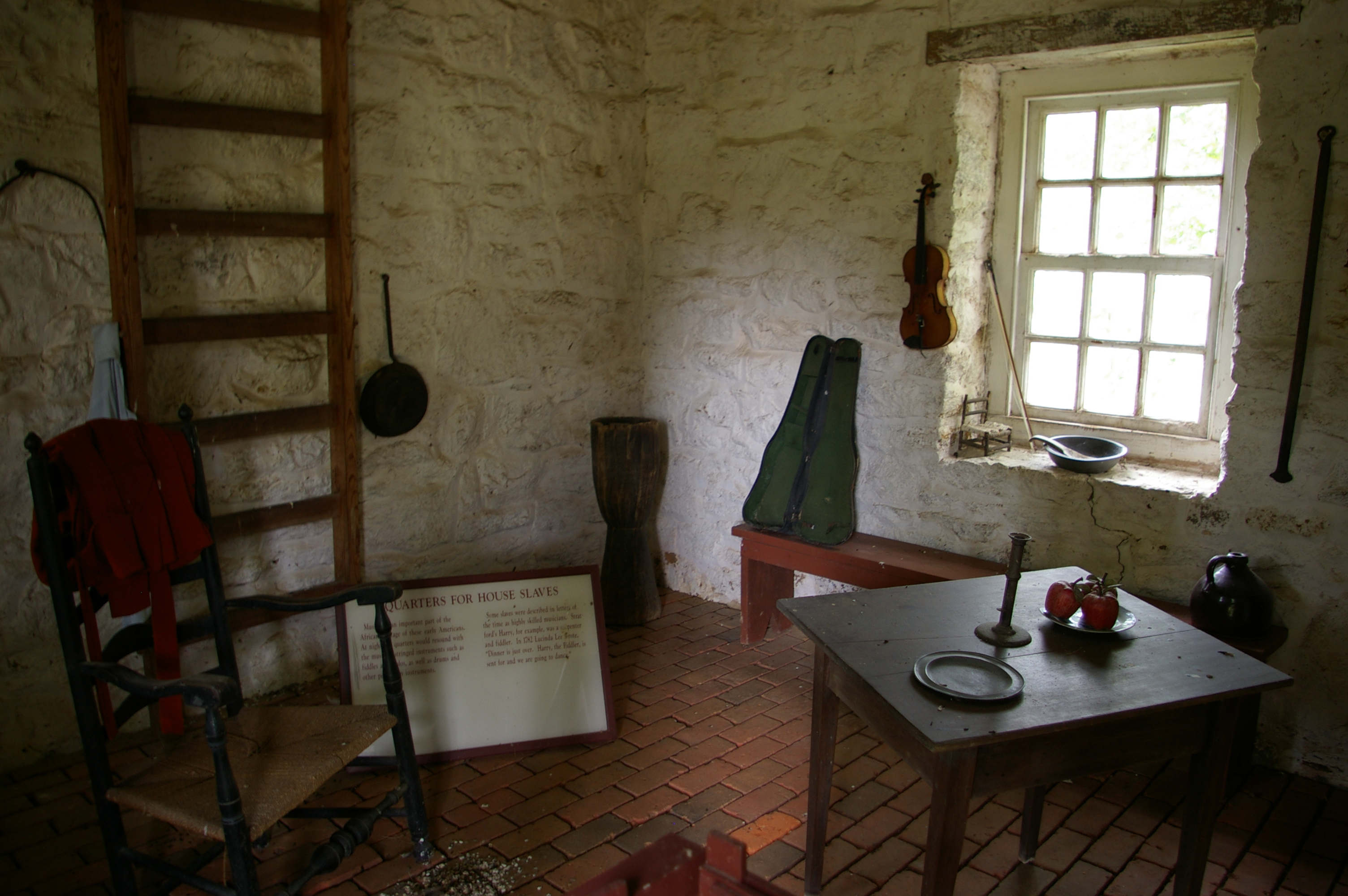
House Slave Quarters at Stratford Hall Plantation

Several years passed before "Light Horse Harry" remarried to Ann Hill Carter (1773–1827) of Shirley Plantation. Their fourth child, Robert Edward Lee (1807–1870), was born at Stratford Hall in 1807. Robert E. Lee spent only his first four years at Stratford Hall, yet remembered it fondly for the remainder of his life. In the middle of the American Civil War, Lee wrote his wife, "In the absence of a home I wish I could purchase Stratford. That is the only place I could go to, now accessible to us, that would inspire me with feelings of pleasure and local love. You and the girls could remain there in quiet. It is a poor place, but we could make enough cornbread and bacon for our support and the girls could weave us clothes. I wonder if it is for sale and at how much."

Light Horse Harry fell heavily into debt and eventually served a two-year term in debtors' prison. Anne Carter Lee and the children departed from Stratford Hall during the winter of 1810–11 and moved to Alexandria. Stratford Hall passed into the hands of Harry and Matilda's surviving son, Major Henry Lee IV "Black Horse" (1787–1837). Still, financial troubles and personal scandals forced him to sell the plantation several years later.

=== After the Lees ===
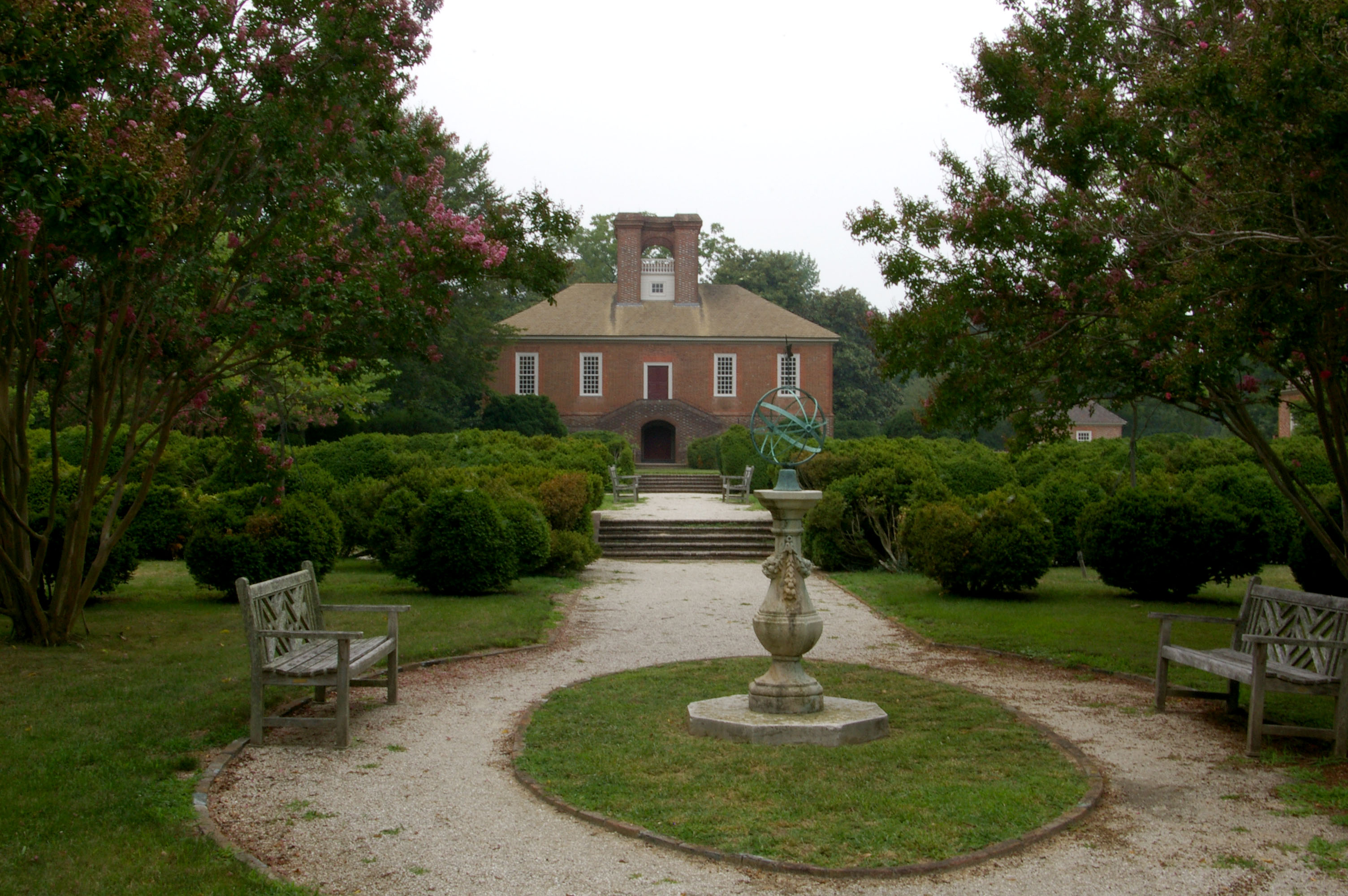
East side of Stratford Hall (looking through the East Garden)

Stratford Hall remained in private hands for more than a century. William C. Somerville of Maryland purchased the property from Henry Lee IV in 1822. After his death, his heirs discovered that obligations incurred by Henry Lee IV continued to encumber the property. The plantation was foreclosed in 1828 and purchased by Henry D. Storke of Westmoreland County, who was married to Elizabeth "Besty" McCarty, sister of Henry Lee IV's wife, Anne Robinson McCarty. Besty Storke lived on the property until she died in 1879 and was buried there.

In 1929, a group of women dedicated to preserving the memory of Robert E. Lee and the Lee family joined to form the Robert E. Lee Memorial Association and purchased Stratford Hall from the Storkes' heirs. The Association maintains the site, which is open to the public.

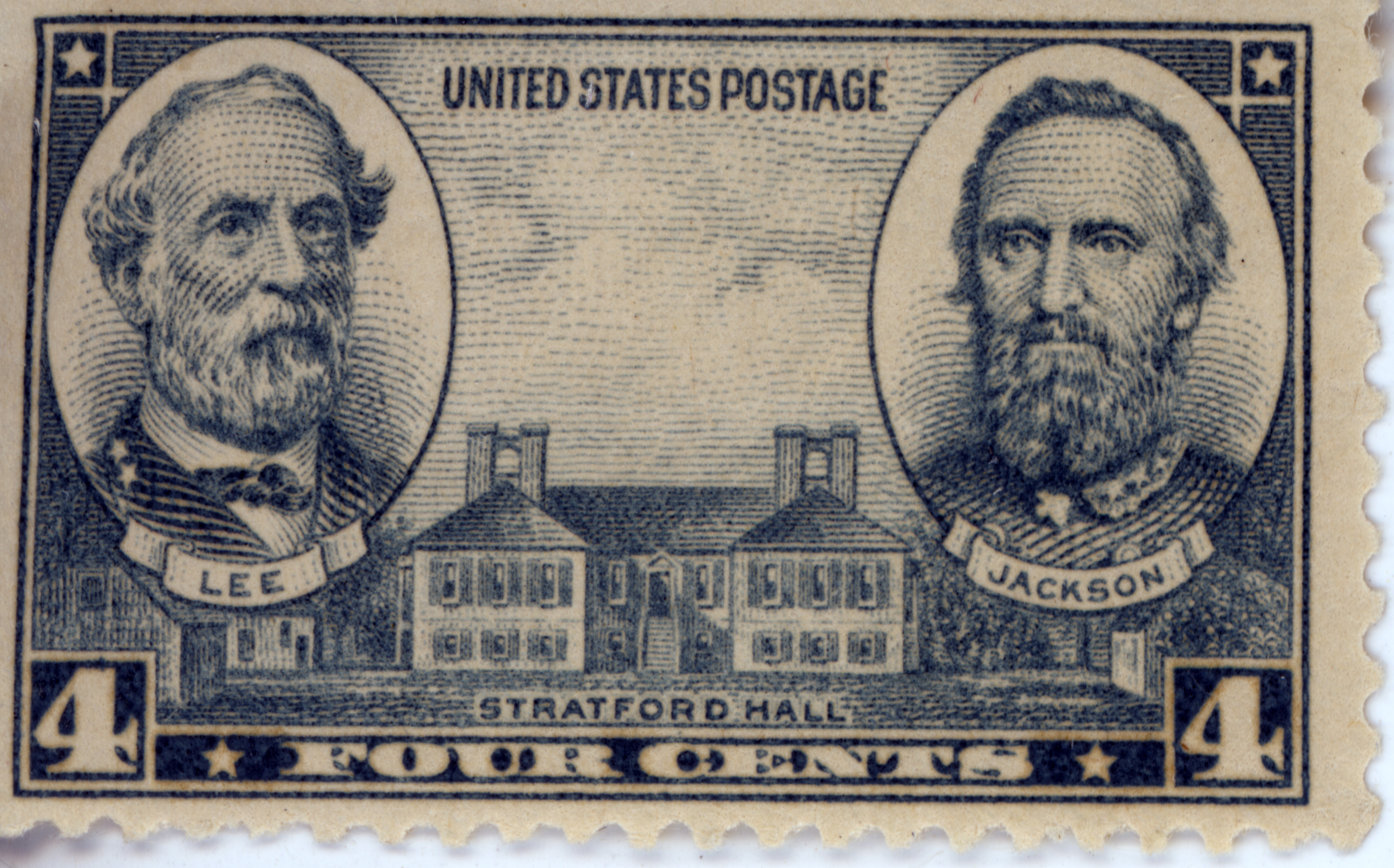
US postage stamp showing Lee, Jackson and Stratford Hall

Stratford Hall was depicted on a 4¢ United States postage stamp of the 1936–1937 Army-Navy issue. The stamp shows General Robert E. Lee and Stonewall Jackson, with Stratford Hall in the center.

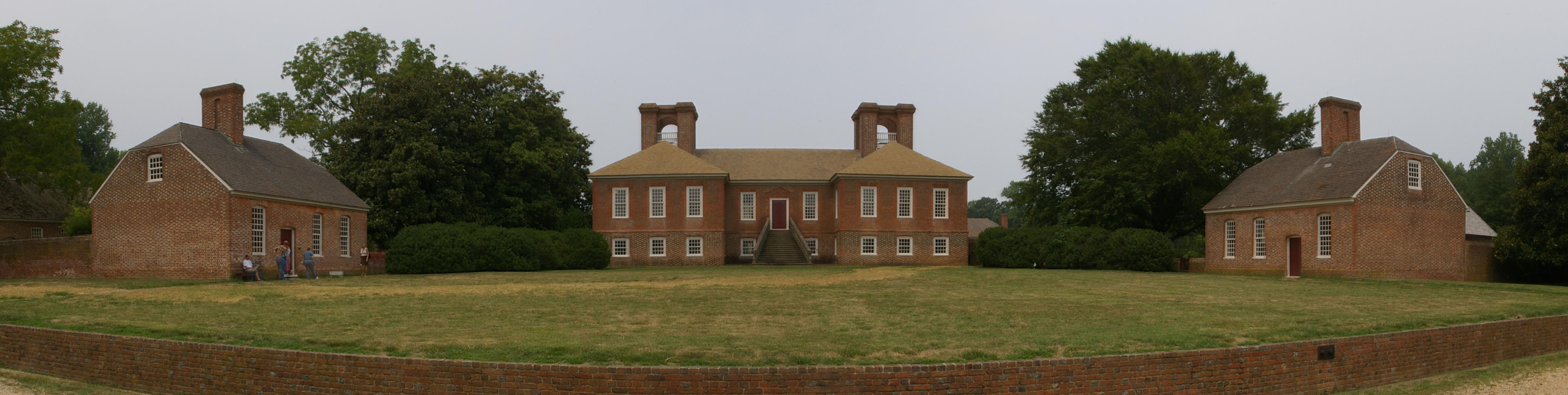
A panorama of Stratford Hall Plantation, set on high bluffs overlooking the Potomac River in the Northern Neck of Virginia.

== Burials at Stratford Hall ==
- Thomas Lee
- Hannah Harrison Ludwell

== See also ==
- List of National Historic Landmarks in Virginia
- National Register of Historic Places listings in Westmoreland County, Virginia
