= Francis Lightfoot Lee =

American Founding Father and politician (1734–1797)

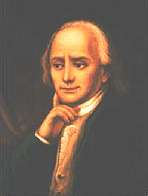

Delegate to the Continental Congress from Virginia
- In office 1774–1779

Member of the Virginia Senate
- In office 1778–1782

Personal details
- Born: October 14, 1734 Stratford Hall Plantation, Westmoreland County, Virginia Colony, British America
- Died: January 11, 1797 (aged 62) Menokin Plantation, Richmond County, Virginia, U.S.
- Resting place: Mount Airy, Tayloe Family Estate, Warsaw, Richmond County
- Spouse: Rebecca Plater Tayloe (m. 1769; died 1797)
- Parent(s): Thomas Lee; Hannah Harrison Ludwell

Francis Lightfoot Lee (October 14, 1734 – January 11, 1797) was a Founding Father of the United States and a member of the House of Burgesses in the Colony of Virginia. As an active protester regarding issues such as the Stamp Act of 1765, Lee helped move the colony in the direction of independence from Britain. Lee was a delegate to the Virginia Conventions and the Continental Congress. He was a signer of the Declaration of Independence and Articles of Confederation as a representative of Virginia. In addition to his career in politics, Lee owned a tobacco plantation as well as many slaves. He was a member of the Lee family, a prominent Virginian dynasty.

== Family, education and early life ==
Coat of Arms of Francis Lightfoot Lee

Lee was born on October 14, 1734, at Stratford Hall Plantation, in Westmoreland County, Virginia. Lee was the fourth son of Thomas Lee and Hannah Harrison Ludwell. His middle name "Lightfoot" came from Francis Lightfoot, the best man at his father's wedding. He was of English descent and was born into one of the First Families of Virginia. He grew up at Stratford Hall, a large tobacco plantation, which his father completed in 1738. He was educated at home, where Lee pursued classical studies under Dr. Craig.

In 1772, Lee married his cousin, Rebecca Plater Tayloe. They were 2nd cousins, once removed. They had no children. Lee lived his entire life in the region of Virginia between the Rappahannock River and the Chesapeake Bay (known as the Northern Neck).

Lee was the grandson of Col. Richard Lee II and a great-grandson of Col. Richard Lee I. Senator Richard Henry Lee and diplomats William Lee and Dr. Arthur Lee were his brothers. Another brother, Thomas Ludwell Lee, was appointed to a committee, along with Thomas Jefferson, to re-write the laws of Virginia. His namesake Francis Lightfoot Lee II was the son of his brother Richard Henry Lee, and men of the same name descend from him.

== Political career ==
In 1774, Lee was among those who called for a general congress and the first of the Virginia Conventions, which he attended. He served in the Virginia State Senate from 1778 to 1782 and was a delegate to the First Continental Congress held in Philadelphia, serving until 1779. As a congressional representative of Virginia, he signed both the Declaration of Independence and the Articles of Confederation. He was elected to the American Philosophical Society in 1768. In 1793, he ran to represent Virginia's 19th congressional district in the U.S. House of Representatives.

== Death and legacy ==
Lee died of pleurisy at his residence (named "Menokin") in Richmond County, Virginia, on January 11, 1797, following his wife's death four days prior. He is buried in the Tayloe family burial ground at Mount Airy Plantation, near Warsaw, Virginia.

The World War II Liberty Ship SS Francis L. Lee was named in his honor.

== See also ==
- Memorial to the 56 Signers of the Declaration of Independence
