= Arthur Lee (diplomat) =

American diplomat (1740–1792)

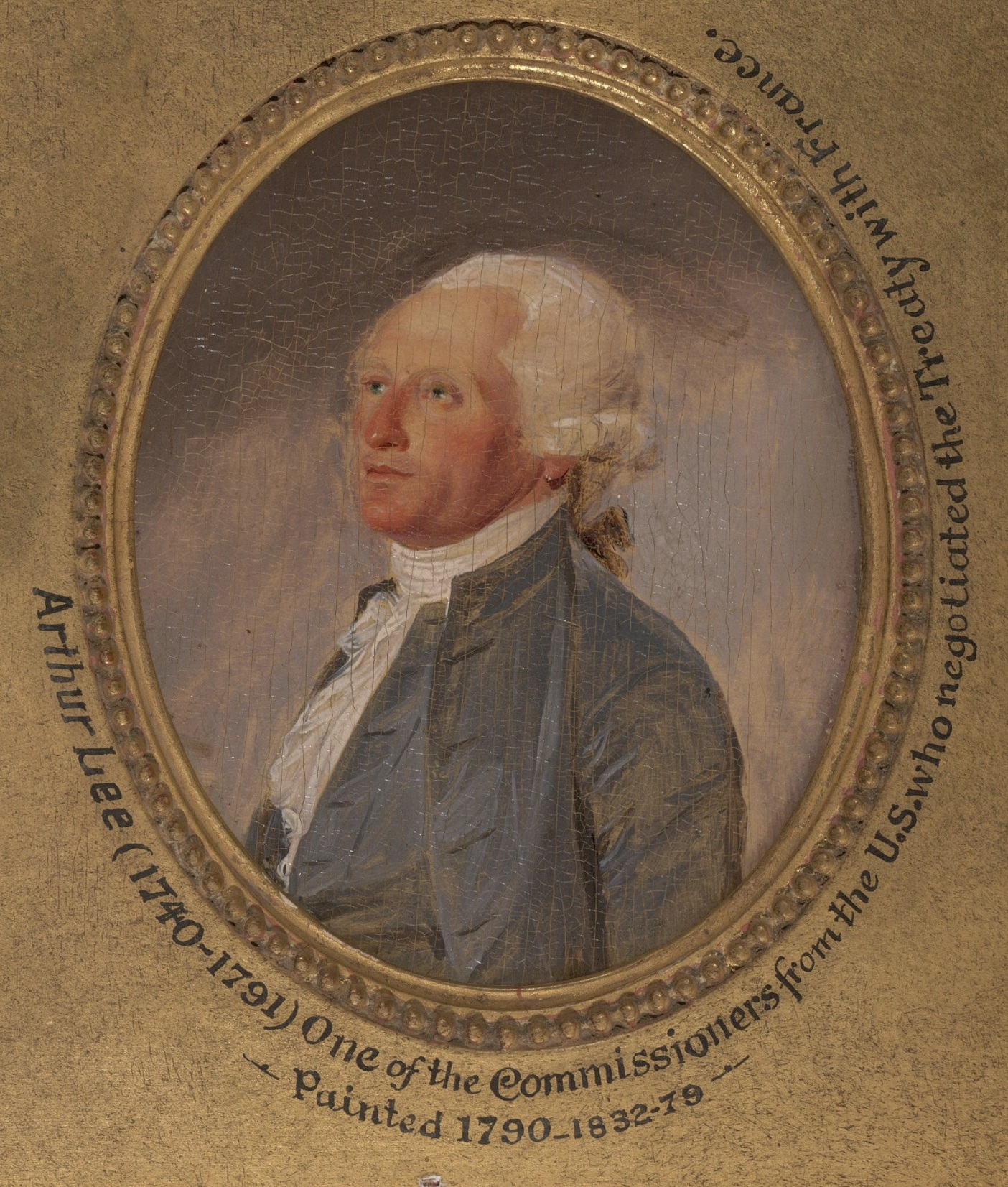
- Portrait by John Trumbull, 1790
- Born: 20 December 1740; Stratford, Virginia, British America
- Died: 12 December 1792 (aged 51); Urbanna, Virginia, U.S.
- Education: Eton College; University of Edinburgh; University of Leiden
- Occupations: Physician, diplomat
- Parents: Thomas Lee (father); Hannah Harrison Ludwell (mother)

Arthur Lee (20 December 1740 – 12 December 1792) was an American physician, diplomat, and abolitionist who was born in the British Colony of Virginia. He helped negotiate and signed the 1778 Treaty of Alliance with France, along with Benjamin Franklin and Silas Deane, which allied France and the United States in fighting the war.

Lee was educated in medicine and law at respectively the University of Edinburgh and in London. After passing the bar, he practiced law in London for several years. He stayed in London during the American Revolutionary War, represented the colonies to Britain and France, and served as an American spy to track their activities. After his return to Virginia, he served as a delegate to the Continental Congress.

== Biography ==
=== Early life and education ===
Born at Stratford Hall, Virginia, Arthur Lee was the youngest son of Hon. Thomas Lee (1690–1750), of the Lee family of Virginia, and Hannah Harrison Ludwell (1701–1750). Three of his five surviving elder brothers, Richard Henry Lee (1732–1794), Francis Lightfoot Lee (1734–1797) and William Lee (1739–1795), also became Revolutionary-era diplomats.

He attended Eton College, in England, and studied medicine at the University of Edinburgh, where he graduated in 1764. The title description of his thesis is: Dissertatio medica inauguralis, de cortice peruviano: quam ... ex auctoritate ... Gulielmi Robertson ... Academiae Edinburgenae praefecti ... pro gradu doctoratus ... eruditorum examini subjicit, Arthur Lee, Virginiensis. Ad diem septembris [1764] ... – Edinburgi : in aedibus A. Donaldson et J. Reid, MDCCLXIV. – 2 p. l., 47 p.; 20 cm. on 13 May 1765 he matriculated at the University of Leiden in the Netherlands.

=== Career ===
During the latter period, Lee wrote in 1764, "An Essay in Vindication of the Continental Colonies of America," one of his more noted works. He opposed the Townshend Acts and became a major proponent of the Patriot cause. After that work, he was granted membership to the American Philosophical Society through his election in 1768.

He studied law in London, passed the bar, and practised there from 1770 to 1776. During his time in London, Lee wrote many influential pamphlets and essays opposing slavery and Parliament's policies. He lived at Poland Street with Paul Wentworth (counsellor) for five years.

In 1770, Lee in London was named as the Massachusetts correspondent to Britain and France. He began corresponding with Samuel Adams, which began a long friendship. They probably did not meet personally until sometime after 1780. Lee met Benjamin Franklin in London, where Franklin was negotiating on behalf of Pennsylvania interests. Lee criticized Franklin's extravagant lifestyle and told Adams he would never be a good negotiator between a free people and a tyrant.

In May 1776, he was a guest at the dinner organized by the publisher Charles Dilly, who at the urging of James Boswell, brought together Samuel Johnson, an ardent opponent of the Patriot cause, and John Wilkes, one of its most prominent British supporters.

=== American Revolution ===
During the American Revolutionary War, the Continental Congress appointed Lee as its envoy to Spain and Prussia, but his success was at best mixed.

In November 1775, the committee of secret correspondence of the Second Continental Congress asked Lee to become its confidential correspondent in London, where during his diplomatic career, he frequently aired suspicions upon the various men who had appointed him along with some of his colleges. Arguably Lee was one of America's first spies. He gathered information in France and Britain. He also successfully identified Edward Bancroft, secretary to the American legation in Paris, as a British spy.

Later, in Paris, after Lee helped negotiate the Treaty of Alliance (1778) with France, he fell out with Benjamin Franklin and Silas Deane. He persuaded Congress to recall Deane to America, but he was himself recalled soon afterward. He earned a reputation of being overly suspicious where, Franklin, in a letter of April 3, 1778 chided him that if he let these feelings dominate his life that he would end up insane.

=== Later life ===
After Lee returned to Virginia, the state in 1782 sent him as a delegate to the Continental Congress. The same year he was elected a Fellow of the American Academy of Arts and Sciences. He unsuccessfully ran as the Anti-Administration candidate for Virginia's 4th congressional district in 1790; he lost to incumbent Richard Bland Lee, a distant relative. He was also a candidate in the October 1792 special election for the U.S. Senate seat that had been held by Richard Henry Lee, his brother, but he lost to John Taylor of Caroline.

In 1790, Arthur Lee purchased Lansdowne from Robert Wormeley III. The fine mansion still stands in Urbanna, a small waterfront town on Virginia's Middle Peninsula. It is presently a private residence. Lee died at Urbanna in 1792 and was buried in the rear garden with no stone. He never married and had no children. Plans to reinter him at Stratford Hall never came about. Lansdowne was listed on the National Register of Historic Places in 1974.

== Ancestry ==
Coat of Arms of Arthur Lee

Arthur Lee was the son of Colonel Thomas Lee, Hon. (1690–1750) of Stratford Hall Plantation, Westmoreland County, Virginia. Thomas married Hannah Harrison Ludwell (1701–1750), the daughter of Colonel Philip Ludwell II (1672–1726) of Green Spring Plantation, and Hannah Harrison (1679–1731).

Arthur's father, Thomas, was the son of Colonel Richard Lee II, Esq., known as "Richard the Scholar" (1647–1715) and Laetitia Corbin (c. 1657 – 1706). Richard Lee II, was the son of Col. Richard Lee I, Esq., known as "The Immigrant" (1618–1664) and Anne Constable (c. 1621 – 1666).

Arthur's paternal grandmother, Laetitia, was the daughter of the Lees' neighbor and councillor (attorney), Hon. Henry Corbin, Sr. (1629–1676) and Alice (Eltonhead) Burnham (c. 1627 – 1684).

Arthur's paternal great-grandmother, Anne, was the daughter of Thomas Constable and became a ward of Sir John Thoroughgood.

== Sources ==
- Chisholm, Hugh, ed. (1911). "Lee, Arthur" . Encyclopædia Britannica (11th ed.). Cambridge University Press.
- Lee, Arthur (1829). Life of Arthur Lee. Vol. I. Boston: Wells and Lilly.
- Lee, Arthur (1829). Life of Arthur Lee. Vol. II. Boston: Wells and Lilly.
- Malone (1932). Dictionary of American biography. Vol. XI.
  New York: Charles Scribner's Sons.
- Potts, Louis W. (1981). "Arthur Lee". American National Biography Online. Oxford University Press.
