= Virginia Declaration of Rights =

1776 document

- Created: May 1776
- Ratified: June 11, 1776
- Location: Library of Congress (first draft)
- Author(s): George Mason (primary), Thomas Ludwell Lee, Robert Carter Nicholas, James Madison
- Purpose: Declare the inherent rights of Virginians (and mankind in general).

Full text
- Virginia Declaration of Rights at Wikisource

The Virginia Declaration of Rights was drafted in 1776 to proclaim the inherent rights of men, including the right to reform or abolish "inadequate" government. It influenced a number of later documents, including the United States Declaration of Independence (1776) and the United States Bill of Rights (1789).

== Drafting and adoption ==
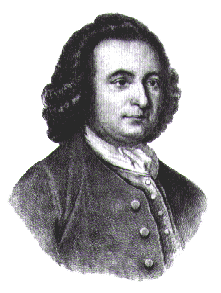
George Mason was the principal author of the Virginia Declaration of Rights.

The Declaration was adopted unanimously by the Fifth Virginia Convention at Williamsburg, Virginia on June 12, 1776, as a separate document from the Constitution of Virginia which was later adopted on June 29, 1776. In 1830, the Declaration of Rights was incorporated within the Virginia State Constitution as Article I, but even before that Virginia's Declaration of Rights stated that it was '"the basis and foundation of government" in Virginia. A slightly updated version may still be seen in Virginia's Constitution, making it legally in effect to this day.

Ten articles were initially drafted by George Mason c. May 20–26, 1776; three other articles were added in committee, seen in the original draft in the handwriting of Thomas Ludwell Lee, but the author is unknown. James Madison later proposed liberalizing the article on religious freedom, but the larger Virginia Convention made further changes. It was later amended by Committee and the entire Convention, including the addition of a section on the right to a uniform government (Section 14). Patrick Henry persuaded the convention to delete a section that would have prohibited bills of attainder, arguing that ordinary laws could be ineffective against some terrifying offenders.

Edmund Pendleton proposed the line "when they enter into a state of society" which allowed slave holders to support the declaration of universal rights which would be understood not to apply to slaves as they were not part of civil society. Mason owned over 100 slaves at the time.

Mason based his initial draft on the rights of citizens described in earlier works such as the English Bill of Rights (1689) and the writings of John Locke. The Declaration can be considered the first modern Constitutional protection of individual rights for citizens of North America. It rejected the notion of privileged political classes or hereditary offices such as the members of Parliament and House of Lords described in the English Bill of Rights.

The Declaration consists of sixteen articles on the subject of which rights "pertain to [the people of Virginia] ... as the basis and foundation of Government." In addition to affirming the inherent nature of rights to life, liberty, property, and pursuing and obtaining happiness and safety, the Declaration both describes a view of Government as the servant of the people, and enumerates its separation of powers into the administration, legislature, and judiciary. Thus, the document is unusual in that it not only prescribes legal rights, but it also describes moral principles upon which a government should be run. The paper the Declaration is written on bears a watermark of the coat of arms of British king George III, possibly necessary to comply with the Stamp Act imposed on the American colonies.

== Contents ==
Articles 1–3 address the subject of rights and the relationship between government and the governed. Article 1 states that "all men are by nature equally free and independent, and have certain inherent rights of which ... they cannot deprive or divest their posterity; namely, the enjoyment of life and liberty, with the means of acquiring and possessing property, and pursuing and obtaining happiness and safety," a statement later made internationally famous in the second paragraph of the U.S. Declaration of Independence, as "we hold these truths to be self-evident, that all men are created equal, and are endowed by their Creator with certain unalienable rights, that among these are Life, Liberty and the pursuit of Happiness."

Articles 2 and 3 state the concept that "all power is vested in, and consequently derived from, the people ..." and that "whenever any government shall be found inadequate or contrary to these purposes, a majority of the community hath an indubitable, unalienable, and indefeasible right to reform, alter or abolish it, in such manner as shall be judged most conducive to the public weal."

Article 4 asserts the equality of all citizens, rejecting the notion of privileged political classes or hereditary offices – another criticism of British institutions such as the House of Lords and the privileges of the peerage: "no set of men, are entitled to exclusive or separate emoluments or privileges from the community, but in consideration of public services; which, not being descendible, neither ought the offices of magistrate, legislator, or judge be hereditary."

Articles 5 and 6 recommend the principles of separation of powers and free elections, "frequent, certain, and regular" of executives and legislators: "That the legislative and executive powers of the state should be separate and distinct from the judicative; and, that the members of the two first ... should, at fixed periods, be reduced to a private station, return into that body from which they were originally taken ... by frequent, certain, and regular elections."

Articles 7–16 propose restrictions on the powers of the government, declaring the government should not have the power of suspending or executing laws, "without consent of the representatives of the people"; establishing the legal rights to be "confronted with the accusers and witnesses, to call for evidence in his favor, and to a speedy trial by an impartial jury of his vicinage," and to prevent a citizen from being "compelled to give evidence against himself." protections against "cruel and unusual punishments", baseless search and seizure, and the guarantees of a trial by jury, freedom of the press, freedom of religion ("all men are equally entitled to the free exercise of religion"), and "the proper, natural, and safe defence of a free state" rested in a well regulated militia composed of the body of the people, trained to arms, that standing armies in time of peace, should be avoided as dangerous to liberty; Article 8 protects a person against "being deprived of his liberty except by the law of the land" which later evolved into the due process clause in the federal Bill of Rights. Article 12 is the first ever codification of the right to a free press and was an important precursor to the First Amendment to the United States Constitution.

== Text ==
The following is the complete text of the Virginia Declaration of Rights:

A DECLARATION OF RIGHTS made by the representatives of the good people of Virginia, assembled in full and free convention which rights do pertain to them and their posterity, as the basis and foundation of government.

Section 1. That all men are by nature equally free and independent and have certain inherent rights, of which, when they enter into a state of society, they cannot, by any compact, deprive or divest their posterity; namely, the enjoyment of life and liberty, with the means of acquiring and possessing property, and pursuing and obtaining happiness and safety.

Section 2. That all power is vested in, and consequently derived from, the people; that magistrates are their trustees and servants and at all times amenable to them.

Section 3. That government is, or ought to be, instituted for the common benefit, protection, and security of the people, nation, or community; of all the various modes and forms of government, that is best which is capable of producing the greatest degree of happiness and safety and is most effectually secured against the danger of maladministration. And that, when any government shall be found inadequate or contrary to these purposes, a majority of the community has an indubitable, inalienable, and indefeasible right to reform, alter, or abolish it, in such manner as shall be judged most conducive to the public weal.

Section 4. None of mankind is entitled to exclusive or separate emoluments or privileges from the community, but in consideration of public services; which, not being descendible, neither ought the offices of magistrate, legislator, or judge to be hereditary.

Section 5. That the legislative and executive powers of the state should be separate and distinct from the judiciary; and that the members of the two first may be restrained from oppression, by feeling and participating the burdens of the people, they should, at fixed periods, be reduced to a private station, return into that body from which they were originally taken, and the vacancies be supplied by frequent, certain, and regular elections, in which all, or any part, of the former members, to be again eligible, or ineligible, as the laws shall direct.

Section 6. That elections of members to serve as representatives of the people, in assembly ought to be free; and that all men, having sufficient evidence of permanent common interest with, and attachment to, the community, have the right of suffrage and cannot be taxed or deprived of their property for public uses without their own consent or that of their representatives so elected, nor bound by any law to which they have not, in like manner, assented for the public good.

Section 7. That all power of suspending laws, or the execution of laws, by any authority, without consent of the representatives of the people, is injurious to their rights and ought not to be exercised.

Section 8. That in all capital or criminal prosecutions a man has a right to demand the cause and nature of his accusation, to be confronted with the accusers and witnesses, to call for evidence in his favor, and to a speedy trial by an impartial jury of twelve men of his vicinage, without whose unanimous consent he cannot be found guilty; nor can he be compelled to give evidence against himself; that no man be deprived of his liberty except by the law of the land or the judgment of his peers.

Section 9. That excessive bail ought not to be required, nor excessive fines imposed, nor cruel and unusual punishments inflicted.

Section 10. That general warrants, whereby an officer or messenger may be commanded to search suspected places without evidence of a fact committed, or to seize any person or persons not named, or whose offense is not particularly described and supported by evidence, are grievous and oppressive and ought not to be granted.

Section 11. That in controversies respecting property, and in suits between man and man, the ancient trial by jury is preferable to any other and ought to be held sacred.

Section 12. That the freedom of the press is one of the great bulwarks of liberty, and can never be restrained but by despotic governments.

Section 13. That a well regulated militia, composed of the body of the people, trained to arms, is the proper, natural, and safe defense of a free state; that standing armies, in time of peace, should be avoided as dangerous to liberty; and that in all cases the military should be under strict subordination to, and governed by, the civil power.

Section 14. That the people have a right to uniform government; and, therefore, that no government separate from or independent of the government of Virginia ought to be erected or established within the limits thereof.

Section 15. That no free government, or the blessings of liberty, can be preserved to any people but by a firm adherence to justice, moderation, temperance, frugality, and virtue and by frequent recurrence to fundamental principles.

Section 16. That religion, or the duty which we owe to our Creator, and the manner of discharging it, can be directed only by reason and conviction, not by force or violence; and therefore all men are equally entitled to the free exercise of religion, according to the dictates of conscience; and that it is the mutual duty of all to practise Christian forbearance, love, and charity toward each other.

The committee draft was written chiefly by George Mason, and the final version was adopted by the Virginia Convention with significant amendments by Robert C. Nicholas and James Madison on June 12, 1776.

== Influence ==
The Virginia Declaration of Rights heavily influenced later documents. The Committee of Five is thought to have drawn on it when they drafted the United States Declaration of Independence in the same month (June 1776). James Madison was also influenced by the Declaration while drafting the Bill of Rights (introduced September 1789, ratified 1791).

The Virginia Declaration of Rights was one of the earliest documents to emphasize the protection of individual rights, rather than protecting only members of Parliament or consisting of simple laws that can be changed as easily as passed. For instance, it was the first declaration of rights to call for a free press.

Virginia's western counties cited the Declaration of Rights as a justification for rejecting the state's Ordinance of Secession before the American Civil War. The delegates to the Wheeling Convention argued that under the Declaration of Rights, any change in the form of government had to be approved by a referendum. Since the Secession Convention had not been convened by a referendum, the western counties argued that all of its acts were void. This set in motion the chain of events that ultimately led the western counties to break off as the separate state of West Virginia.
