= Old money =

Social class of the rich

Old money (also old-money) is a social class of the rich who have been able to maintain their wealth over multiple generations, in contrast with new money whose wealth has been acquired within its own generation. The term often refers to perceived members of the de facto aristocracy in societies that historically lack an officially established aristocratic class (such as the United States).

== Wealth and class ==
Wealth—assets held by an individual or by a household—provides an important dimension of social stratification because it can pass from generation to generation, ensuring that a family's offspring will remain financially stable. Families with "old money" use accumulated assets or savings to bridge interruptions in income, thus guarding against downward social mobility.

== United States ==
According to anthropologist W. Lloyd Warner, the upper class in the United States during the 1930s was divided into the upper-upper and the lower-upper classes. The lower-upper were those who did not come from traditionally wealthy families. They earned their money from investments and business, rather than inheritance. Examples include John D. Rockefeller, whose father was a traveling peddler; Cornelius Vanderbilt, whose father operated a ferry in New York Harbor; Henry Flagler, who was the son of a Presbyterian minister; and Andrew Carnegie, who was the son of a Scottish weaver. In contrast to the nouveaux riches, whose riches were acquired in their own generation, the upper-upper class were families viewed as "quasi-aristocratic" and "high society". These families had been rich and prominent in the politics of the United States for generations. In many cases, their prominence predated the American Revolution (1765–1783), when their ancestors had accumulated fortunes as members of the elite planter class, or as merchants, slave traders, ship-owners, or fur traders. In many cases, especially in Virginia, Maryland, and the Carolinas, the source of these families' wealth were vast tracts of land granted to their ancestors by the Crown or acquired by headright during the colonial period. These planter class families were often related to each other through intermarriage for more than 300 years, and are sometimes known as American gentry. They produced several Founding Fathers of the United States and a number of early presidents of the United States.

After the American Civil War (1861–1865), many in the upper-upper class saw their wealth greatly reduced. Their slaves became freedmen. Union forces under Generals William Tecumseh Sherman and Philip Sheridan had also cut wide swaths of destruction through portions of Virginia, the Carolinas and Georgia. They destroyed crops, killed or confiscated livestock, burned barns and gristmills, and in some cases torched plantation houses and even entire cities such as Atlanta. They were using scorched earth tactics, designed to starve the Confederate States of America into submission. After the Thirteenth Amendment to the United States Constitution (1865) and the emancipation of the slaves, many plantations were converted to sharecropping. African American freedmen were working as sharecroppers on the same land which they had worked as slaves before the war. Despite the fact that their circumstances were greatly reduced, the enactment of Jim Crow laws and the disenfranchisement of freed black people allowed many planter class families in the Southern United States to regain their political prominence, if not their great wealth, following Reconstruction (1863–1877).

In the early 20th century, the upper-upper class were seen as more prestigious than the nouveau riche even if the nouveau riche had more wealth. During the late 19th century and early 20th century, the nouveau rich flaunted their wealth by building Gilded Age mansions that emulated the palaces of European royalty, while old money was more conservative. American "Old money" families tend to adhere to various Mainline Protestant denominations; Episcopalians and Presbyterians are the most prevalent among them.

=== Early Colonial ===
- The Byrd Family of Virginia, FFV, is descended from William Byrd I who received a 1,200-acre (4.9 km^{2}) grant on 27 October 1673 at the fall line of the James River that would later become the site of Richmond, Virginia. Byrd's son William Byrd II of Westover Plantation who inherited the land was an American planter and author from Charles City County in colonial Virginia. He expanded his holdings to approximately 179,000-acre (720 km^{2}) and founded the City of Richmond. Although much of the family's wealth was squandered during the 18th century by William Byrd III through gambling and bad investments, descendant Richard Evelyn Byrd Sr. became wealthy as an apple grower in the Shenandoah Valley and publisher of the Winchester StarWinchester Star newspaper. He was elected to the Virginia House of Delegates in 1906 and served as Speaker from 1908 to 1914. His son Harry Flood Byrd was elected the 50th Governor of Virginia in 1925, and later served in the U.S. Senate until his retirement in 1965. Byrd controlled a Democratic political machine known as the Byrd Organization that dominated Virginia politics for most of the 20th century. Byrd was succeeded in the U.S. Senate by his son Harry F. Byrd Jr. who served until 1981. The family also produced early Ohio political leader and jurist, Charles Willing Byrd, and polar explorer, Rear Admiral Richard E. Byrd.
- The Cabot family arrived in Salem from the Isle of Jersey in 1700 and made fortunes in shipping. George Cabot was an American merchant, seaman, and politician from Massachusetts. He represented Massachusetts in the U.S. Senate and was the presiding officer of the infamous Hartford Convention. Samuel Cabot Jr. was an American businessman in the early-nineteenth-century China Trade. James Elliot Cabot was an American philosopher and author, born in Boston to Samuel Cabot Jr., and Eliza Cabot. Edward Clarke Cabot was an American architect and artist. Henry Cabot Lodge was a member of the Porcellian Club, an American Republican politician, historian, and statesman from Massachusetts. He served in the United States Senate from 1893 to 1924 and is best known for his positions on foreign policy.At the age of 21, Godfrey Lowell Cabot (see Lowells below) founded the Cabot Corporation, the largest producer of carbon black in the country.
- The Carter family of Corotoman, Shirley, Sabine Hall, Nomony Hall, Cleve and Carter's Grove, FFV, of Virginia is descended from Robert "King" Carter, of Lancaster County, who was a planter, businessman and colonist in Virginia and became one of the wealthiest men in the colonies accumulating over 300,000 acres of land and more than 1,000 slaves. As President of the Governor's Council of the Virginia Colony, he was acting Governor of Virginia from 1726 to 1727 after the death in office of Governor Hugh Drysdale. He acquired the moniker "King" due to his great wealth, political power, and autocratic business methods. His many notable descendants include: Robert Burwell, a member of the Virginia House of Burgesses, Robert Carter III, who sat on the Virginia Governor's Council, Carter Braxton, a signer of Declaration of Independence, Mann Page a Virginia delegate to the Continental Congress in 1777, Confederate States Army General Robert E. Lee, Confederate Army first lieutenant Robert Randolph Carter, John Page, the 13th Governor of Virginia, Thomas Nelson Page, who served as U.S. ambassador to Italy during the Woodrow Wilson administration, and civil engineer and industrialist William Nelson Page. U.S. President Jimmy Carter is descended from Robert "King" Carter's uncle, Thomas Carter, who settled in Virginia in 1635.
- The Corbin Family, FFV, of Middlesex County, Virginia, beginning with Henry Corbin was an emigrant from England who became a tobacco planter in the Virginia colony and served in both houses of the Virginia General Assembly, in the House of Burgesses representing Lancaster County before the creation of Middlesex County on Virginia's Middle Neck, then on the Governor's Council. The governor and council made Corbin a justice of the Lancaster County court in 1657. Lancaster County voters in both 1659 and 1660 elected Corbin as one of their representatives in the House of Burgesses, alongside the county's largest plantation owner, John Carter, Sr. His son Gawin Corbin (burgess) was prominent in political affairs. His daughter Laetitia Corbin Lee married Richard Lee II of Machodoc Plantation, while another daughter Ann married William Tayloe (the nephew). Gawin Corbin Sr., son of the Burgess was a Virginia planter and politician who served in the House of Burgesses representing Middlesex County, Virginia. Richard Corbin was a Virginia planter and politician who represented Middlesex County in the House of Burgesses and the Virginia Governor's Council. Although a noted Loyalist during the American Revolutionary War (during which two brothers served in British forces), he considered himself a Virginian and two of his descendants of the same name also served in the Virginia General Assembly following the conflict. Hannah Lee Corbin was an American women's rights advocate and member of the Lee family in Virginia. A controversial widow in her own time in part for her refusal to marry her paramour (with whom she had children) or conversion from the Church of England to the Baptists, she may today be best known for asking that women be given the right to vote. John Tayloe Corbin was a Virginia planter and politician who represented King and Queen County in the House of Burgesses. The son of the powerful planter Richard Corbin, a member of the Governor's Council, he was likewise a Loyalist during the American Revolutionary War (during which two brothers served in British forces), but remained in Virginia.

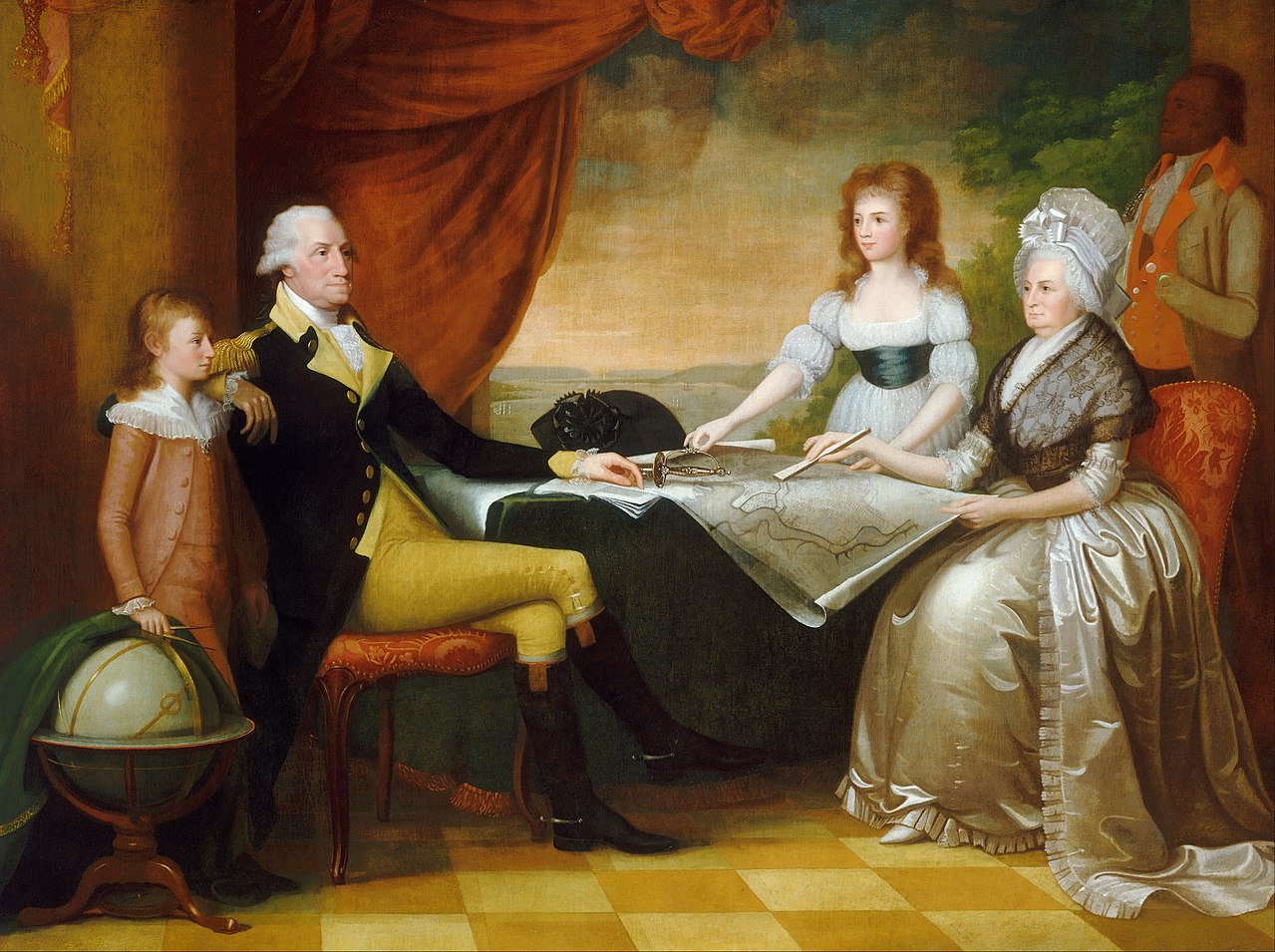
George and Martha Washington with Their Grandchildren. George Washington Parke Custis, and Eleanor Parke Custis

- The Custis Family FFV dates back to the mid-seventeenth century, four members of the Custis family immigrated to the colony of Virginia: Anne, John Custis II, William II, and their uncle John I. John II was the most successful at establishing the family name into prominent society, advancing into the Virginia ruling class by serving as a sheriff, justice of the peace, surveyor, coroner, militia officer, member of the House of Burgess, and Councillor. John II also built a large mansion that he called Arlington. His descendants included his son John Custis III and grandson John IV, who was born in August 1678. John Custis IV was the father of Daniel Parke Custis, Martha Dandridge Custis's first husband, Martha's second husband was George Washington. Making his step-grandchildren and wife the First Inaugural Family.
- The Delano family of Massachusetts and New York is descended from Philippe de Lannoy, who was born in 1602 to parents of French and Dutch descent. In the United States, members of the Delano family include U.S. presidents Franklin Delano Roosevelt, Ulysses S. Grant and Calvin Coolidge, astronaut Alan B. Shepard, and writer Laura Ingalls Wilder. Delano family forebears include the Pilgrims who chartered the Mayflower, seven of its passengers, and three signers of the Mayflower Compact.
- The Griswold Family of Connecticut made their fortune in shipping, banking, railroads, and industry. They have been prominent in American politics, producing five governors and numerous senators and congressmen.
- The Harrisons of Berkley, FFV, of Virginia is an American political family, of the Commonwealth of Virginia, whose direct descendants include a Founding Father of the United States, Benjamin Harrison V, and three U. S. presidents: William Henry Harrison, Benjamin Harrison, and Abraham Lincoln. The Virginia Harrison family consists primarily of two branches with origins in northern England. One branch, led by Benjamin Harrison I, journeyed by way of Bermuda to Virginia before 1633 and settled along the James River where they became wealthy planters; they are often referred to as the James River Harrisons. Successive generations of this branch served in the legislature of the Colony of Virginia, including Benjamin V, who was a signatory of the Declaration of Independence and later governor of Virginia. This branch of the Harrison family produced President William Henry Harrison, Benjamin V's son, and President Benjamin Harrison, William Henry's grandson, as well as another Virginia governor, Albertis Harrison. The family also includes two Chicago mayors and members of the U.S. House of Representatives and the U.S. Senate. The other branch of the Virginia Harrisons emigrated from Britain to New England in 1687 and moved south to the Shenandoah Valley of Virginia 50 years later; they were led by Isaiah Harrison. This branch most likely descended from an interim chaplain of the Jamestown Colony, Rev. Thomas Harrison, who was kindred to the James River Harrisons, but by 1650 had returned to England. President Abraham Lincoln descended from the Shenandoah Valley Harrisons, as did entertainer Elvis Presley. This branch of the family also included the founders of Harrisonburg and Dayton and physician J. Hartwell Harrison, who was part of the medical team that accomplished the world's first successful kidney transplant surgery.
- The Lowell family are descended from Boston colonists. John Lowell was a delegate to the Congress of the Confederation, a judge of the Court of Appeals in Cases of Capture under the Articles of Confederation, a United States district judge of the United States District Court for the District of Massachusetts and a United States circuit judge of the United States Circuit Court for the First Circuit. John Lowell Jr. was an American lawyer and influential member of the Federalist Party in the early days of the United States of America. Francis Cabot Lowell began the fortune in shipping and later textiles. The family has produced several noteworthy individuals, including Abbott Lawrence Lowell, who presided over Harvard for 24 years.
- The Ogle Family of Belair and Ogle Hall, Maryland including Provencial Governor Samuel Ogle and Governor Benjamin Ogle descend from the Barons Ogle, prominent landed gentry in Northumberland, England, of Ogle Castle and Bothal Castle, allied through marriage with the Manner's of Rutland, Cavendish family of Newcastle, the premiere peerage, the Baron de Ros, and the ancient Norman House of Percy.
- The Randolph family, FFV, is descended from William Randolph, an American colonist who accumulated a vast fortune including over 20,000 acres (81 km2) of land as a planter and merchant, and played an important role in the history and government of the English colony of Virginia. He arrived in Virginia sometime between 1669 and 1673 and married Mary Isham a few years later. Randolph's descendants have included many prominent Americans, including U.S. President Thomas Jefferson, U.S. Chief Justice John Marshall, Confederate general Robert E. Lee, Peyton Randolph, the first President of the Continental Congress, and Edmund Randolph, who served as the seventh Governor of Virginia, the second U.S. Secretary of State, and the first U.S. Attorney General as well as many other notable individuals in Virginia and U.S. politics.
- The Roosevelt family of Manhattan arrived from the Netherlands as colonists in the 17th century and later became prominent in business and politics. Two distantly related branches of the family, from Oyster Bay on Long Island and Hyde Park in Dutchess County, rose to global political prominence with the elections of Presidents Theodore Roosevelt (1901–1909) and his fifth cousin Franklin D. Roosevelt (1933–1945), whose wife, First Lady Eleanor Roosevelt, was Theodore's niece.
- The Tayloes, of Mount Airy, The Octagon House, Powhattan Hill, Buena Vista, the Tayloe House in Colonial Williamsburg, and later the Alabama, Canebrake, FFV, descended from William Tayloe (planter) who first held elected office in 1647 as High Sheriff of York County, Virginia. He married Elizabeth Kingsmill, daughter of Virginia Company proprietor Richard Kingsmill. William Tayloe (the nephew) built the Old House in Old Rappahannock County and married Ann Corbin (1664–1694), daughter of Hon. Henry Corbin and Alice (Eltonhead) Corbin, of "Buckingham House" Middlesex County, John Tayloe II built Mount Airy, imported Diomed, and after the death of King Carter took over the moniker of Wealthiest Man/Family in Virginia. John Tayloe III lent his home in Washington, D.C., The Octagon House, to President James Madison and wife Dolly Madison after the British burnt the White House during The War of 1812. He founded St. John's Episcopal Church, Lafayette Square and the Washington Jockey Club with Charles Carnan Ridgely of Hampton, and bred Sir Archie. His sons, all scions of the tidewater gentry, their mother the daughter of Benjamin Ogle of Belair and Ogle Hall, descended from the Baron Ogle of Northumberland, allied through marriage with the Manners of Rutland, Cavendish family of Newcastle, the premiere peerage, the Baron de Ros and ancient Norman House of Percy. John Tayloe IV served as a midshipman on the USS Constitution, Benjamin Ogle Tayloe was a member of the Porcellian Club and then a prominent political activist in Washington, D.C., having begun his career as Richard Rush's personal secretary during his time as Ambassador to the Court of St. James, and built the Benjamin Ogle Tayloe House on Lafayette Square. Edward Thornton Tayloe was a member of the Porcellian Club, served as a diplomat having begun his career as Joel Roberts Poinsett's personal secretary, and was rumored to be William Henry Harrison's pick for Secretary of the Treasury before this untimely death, and Henry Augustine Tayloe co-founded the Fair Grounds Race Course with French Creole Bernard de Marigny. While the foundation of their wealth was agricultural slave plantations, they exemplified gentry entrepreneurship by diversifying and vertically integrating; first shipbuilding to move the agricultural produce, then producing iron, smelting, at their furnaces Bristol Iron Works and Neabsco Iron Works and mining their coal fields in Namejoy, Maryland, namely Tayloe's Neck, to build ships.
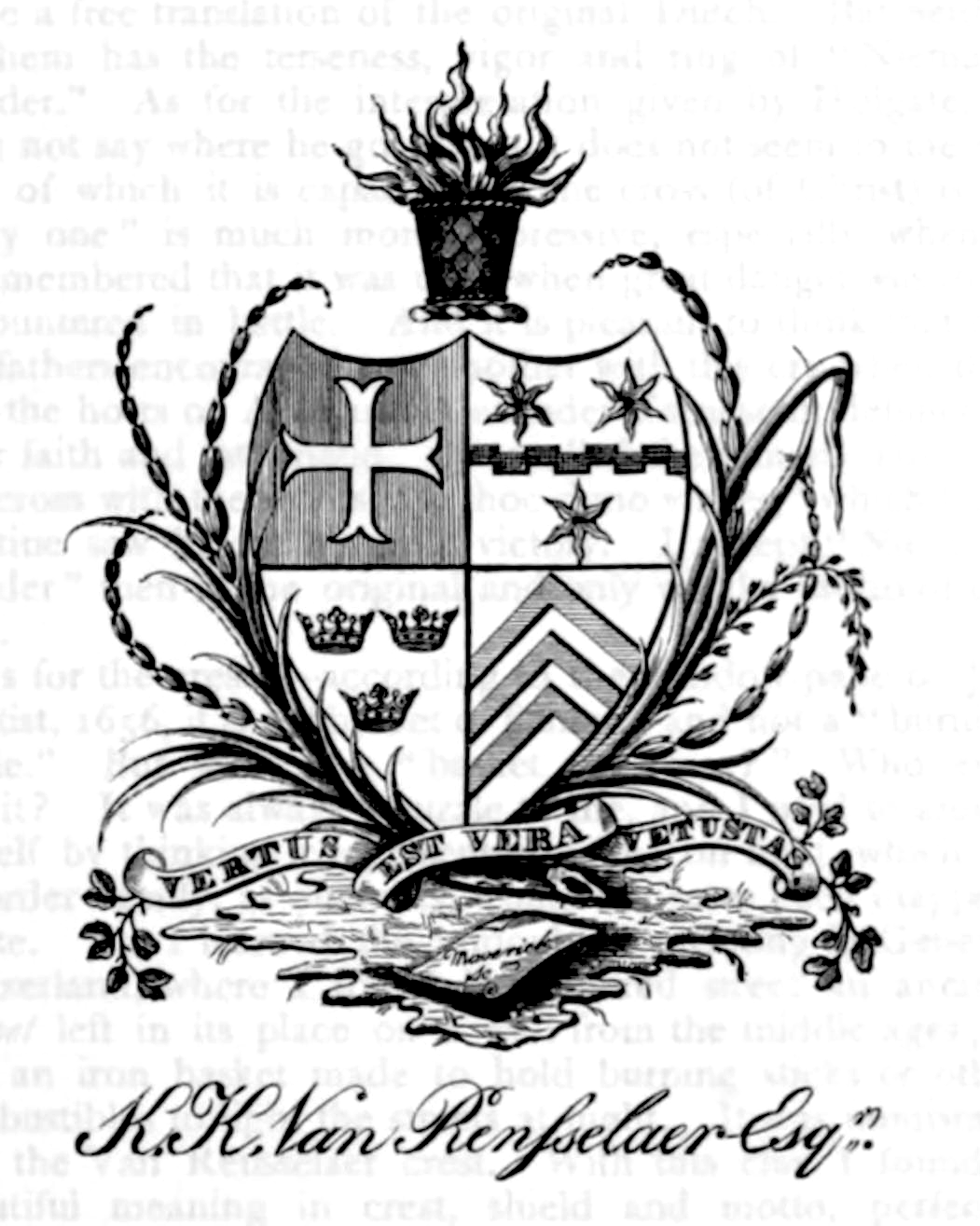
- Arms of the Van Rensselaer family
  The Van Rensselaer family of the Manor of Rensselaerswyck, is a family of Dutch descent that was prominent during the 17th, 18th, and 19th centuries in the area now known as the state of New York. Members of this family played a critical role in the formation of the United States and served as leaders in business, politics, and society. Beginning with Kiliaen van Rensselaer (merchant) was a Dutch diamond and pearl merchant from Amsterdam who was one of the founders and directors of the Dutch West India Company, being instrumental in the establishment of New Netherland. He was granted the Manor of Rensselaerswyck in what is now mainly New York's Capital District. His estate remained throughout the Dutch and British colonial era and the American Revolution as a legal entity until the 1840s. Johan van Rensselaer was the second patroon of the Manor of Rensselaerswyck, was the eldest son of Kiliaen van Rensselaer, and his first wife, Hillegonda van Bylaer.
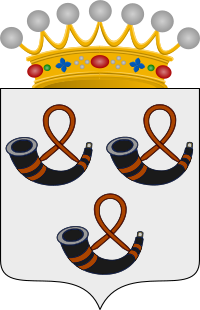
- Arms of the Van Watervliet family
  The Van Everinghe van Watervliet family (eventually simplified and Anglicized to Van Every and Van Avery) were Dutch barons who first amassed a fortune as brewers, land owners, and high governmental officials in the old country in the mid-16th Century. Migrating to North America in the mid-17th Century they continued to become prominent smiths, fur traders, and land owners from the founding of Beverwijck, present day Albany, New York, through the American Revolution. The city of Watervliet, New York, is likely named after the family's original ridderhofstede (knightly estate) in the County of Zeeland. The first members were granted a warrant as sole suppliers of arms and armor to Fort Orange, were active in the Albany Convention during Leisler's Rebellion, and were close associates of the Van Rensselaers. Later, one member took the Oath of Secrecy as a Son of Liberty, served as Chairman of the Schenectady Committee of Correspondence and as a Senator in the newly-formed New York Assembly. Several served as officers in the militia during the Revolution, including in Van Rensselaer's Regiment, and one served alongside George Washington from 1775 to 1780, including the bitter winter at Valley Forge and the Crossing of the Delaware. Later generations include industrialists, hoteliers, inventors, professional athletes, and writers, and share bloodlines with George Washington, John Adams, Benjamin Franklin, and Philip Schuyler.

=== Late Colonial ===
- The Astor family made their fortune in the 18th century, through fur trading, real estate, the hotel industry, and other investments.
- The Forbes family of Boston made their fortune in the shipping and later railroad industries as well as other investments. They have been a prominent wealthy family in the United States for 200 years.
- The Hartwick family is of mainly English and German descent, and their ancestry and fortune predates the American Revolution. The Hartwicks have produced several politicians and military generals, such as Edward Hartwick. By World War I, the family-controlled most of the lumber in the United States. The Hartwick's philanthropic works include the founding of Hartwick College, and Hartwick Pines State Park.

=== Early National Era ===
- The Du Pont family fortune began in 1803, but they became an extraordinarily wealthy family by selling gunpowder during the American Civil War. By World War I, the DuPont family produced virtually all American gunpowder. In 1968, Ferdinand Lundberg declared the Du Pont fortune to be America's largest family fortune. As of 2008 E. I. du Pont de Nemours and Company ranked 81st on the Fortune 500 list of the largest U.S. corporations.
- The Mellon family made their fortune in the banking business. The Mellon Bank was founded in 1869 by Thomas Mellon. Under the direction of his son, Andrew Mellon the family amassed one of the Gilded Age's largest fortunes. They became principal investors and majority owners of Gulf Oil (which merged with Chevron Corporation in 1985), Alcoa (since 1886), The Pittsburgh Tribune-Review (since 1970), Koppers (since 1912), and New York Shipbuilding (1899–1968), as well as other major firms. The family bank merged with the Bank of New York and continues today as BNY Mellon.
- The Van Leer family of Pennsylvania made their fortune in the iron business. They have been prominent in academia, business, and American politics. Descendants include successful entrepreneurs, governors, congressmen, university presidents, and university founders.
- The Whitney family is an American family notable for their business enterprises, social prominence, wealth and philanthropy, founded by John Whitney, who came from London, England to Watertown, Massachusetts in 1635. The Whitney family are members of the Episcopal Church.

Although many "old money" individuals do not rank as high on the list of Forbes 400 richest Americans as their ancestors did, their wealth continues to grow. Many families increased their holdings by investment strategies such as the pooling of resources. For example, the Rockefeller family's estimated net worth of $1 billion in the 1930s grew to $8.5 billion by 2000—that is, not adjusted for inflation. In 60 years, four of the richest families in the United States increased their combined $2–4 billion in 1937 to $38 billion without holding large shares in emerging industries. When adjusted for inflation, the actual dollar wealth of many of these families has shrunk since the 1930s.

From a private wealth manager's perspective, "old money" can be classified into two: active "old money" and passive "old money". The former includes inheritors who, despite the inherited wealth at their disposal or that which they can access in the future, choose to pursue their own career or set up their own businesses. Paris Hilton and Sir Stelios Haji-Ioannou did this. On the other hand, passive "old money" are the idle rich or those who are not wealth producers.

"Old money" contrasts with the nouveau riche and parvenus. These fall under the category "new money" (those not from traditionally wealthy families).

== Europe ==
The Rothschild family, as an example, established finance houses across Europe from the 18th century and was ennobled by the Habsburg emperor and Queen Victoria. Throughout the 19th century, they controlled the largest fortune in the world, in today's terms many hundreds of billions. The family has, at least to some extent, maintained its wealth for over two centuries.

On the other hand, in the United Kingdom, the term generally exclusively refers to the nobility—that is, the peerage and landed gentry—who traditionally live off the land inherited paternally. The British concept is analogous to good lineage and it is not uncommon to find someone with "old money" who is actually poor or insolvent. By 2001, however, those belonging to this category—the aristocratic landowners—are still part of the wealthiest list in the United Kingdom. For instance, the Duke of Westminster, by way of his Grosvenor estate, owns large swaths of properties in London that include 200 acres of Belgravia and 100 acres of Mayfair. There is also the case of Viscount Portman, who is the owner of 100 acres of land north of Oxford Street.

Many countries had wealth-based restrictions on voting. In France, out of a nation of 27 million people, only 80,000 to 90,000 were allowed to vote in the 1820 French legislative election and the richest one-quarter of them had two votes.

== See also ==
- Aristocracy
- The Establishment
- Gentry
- High culture
- Mentifact
- Nepotism
- Nobility
- Nouveau riche
- Old boy network
- Parvenu
- Social environment
- Social status
- Status–income disequilibrium
- Symbolic capital
- Rentier capitalism

Time-related, regional or local cases

- American gentry
- Black elite
- Boston Brahmin
- First Families of Virginia
- The Four Hundred (Gilded Age)
- Grand Burgher (German Großbürger)
- Hanseaten (class)
- Landed gentry
- Old Philadelphians
- Patrician (post-Roman Europe)
- Preppy
- White Anglo-Saxon Protestant

Publications

- La Distinction
- Social Register
