= Gawin Corbin =

Gawin Corbin may refer to:

- Gawin Corbin (burgess) (1669–1745), Virginia planter, militia officer, customs collector and politician
- Gawin Corbin Sr. (1725–1760), Virginia planter and politician
- Gawin Corbin Jr. (1739–1779), Virginia planter, loyalist militia officer, customs collector and politician
