= Gawin Corbin Jr. =

Virginia loyalist, planter and politician

Member of the Governor's Advisory Council of the Colony of Virginia
- In office 1775–1776
- Preceded by: John Page
- Succeeded by: position abolished

Member of the House of Burgesses for Middlesex County
- In office 1764–1771 Serving with John Smith, Philip Ludwell Grymes, Edmund Berkeley
- Preceded by: Ralph Wormeley
- Succeeded by: James Montague

Personal details
- Born: December 15, 1739 Buckingham plantation
- Died: July 19, 1779 (aged 39) Buckingham plantation, Middlesex County, Virginia
- Spouse: Eleanor Tayloe
- Relations: Richard Corbin(father); Francis Corbin (brother); John Tayloe Corbin(brother); Gawin Corbin Sr.(uncle); Gawin Corbin (burgess) grandfather, Henry Corbyn(great grandfather)
- Education: Eton; Trinity Hall, Cambridge University
- Occupation: planter, politician

Gawin Corbin Jr. (December 15, 1739 – July 19, 1779), although trained as a lawyer in England, became a Virginia planter, loyalist militia officer, customs collector and politician who served in both chambers of the Virginia General Assembly as had his father Richard Corbin.

== Early and family life ==
The eldest son of the former Betty Tayloe (1719–1791) and her planter husband Richard Corbin (1714–1790) of "Laneville" plantation was born into the First Families of Virginia. His great-grandfather Henry Corbyn had emigrated to Virginia, married a widow and begun the family's assimilation into the colony's political elite as well as acquired several valuable properties between the Mattaponi and Rappahannock Rivers that became many plantations, including Peckatone, Nesting, Machotick, Jones Farm, Gales, Corbin Hall and Buckingham (although the names of the counties in which they were located changed as populations increased). The boy shared the name of his grandfather Col. Gawin Corbin (1669–1744) who served as burgess for Middlesex County and later for King and Queen County, as well as his uncle Gawin Corbin Sr. (1725–1760) who inherited considerable lands including his father's (this man's grandfather's) main Peckatone plantation in what had become Westmoreland County (as well as probably also served as burgess). That uncle's widow Hannah Lee Corbin not only outlived her husband and this man, but caused multiple scandals for her advocacy of women's rights and Baptist faith, continuing to manage his estate of more than 1700 acres in Caroline, Fauquier, King George and Westmoreland Counties, and refusing to marry her paramour Dr. Hall (whom she survived by many years, her first husband's will providing that she would forfeit the property upon remarrying). Complicating matters further, he also had one or two cousins with the same name, who lived in other counties of the Northern Neck and who were not as politically active.

=== Education and birth family ===
Educated privately in Virginia as befit his class, this young Gawin Corbin traveled to England as a teenager to attend Grimstead in Essex (a private preparatory school). On January 26, 1756, he formally began studies at Christ College of Cambridge University and on February 11 of the same year began his legal studies at the Middle Temple. Admitted to the bar in 1761, Corbin returned to Virginia.

His mother bore three more sons, of whom John Tayloe Corbin (1745–1794) and Francis Corbin (1759–1821) would likewise become politicians as well as planters. Their middle brothers were Richard (b. 1751) and Thomas Corbin (b. 1755), both of whom were alive but unmarried in 1783 (four years after this man's death); Thomas would move to England and accepted a British military commission. Their sister Elizabeth (1736–1797) married Carter Braxton, planter, burgess and signer of the Declaration of Independence. Their sisters Alicia and Letitia were both alive but unmarried in 1783.

=== Marriage and family ===
On November 17, 1762, Corbin married his cousin, Joanna Tucker (1744–1780) of Norfolk, Virginia, daughter of sea captain Robert Tucker whose business partner was Constantius John Phipps of Bermuda. According to different accounts, they had four or five daughters as well as a son. Richard Henry Corbin (1775–1799)), his father's principal heir when he reached legal age, married his first cousin Elizabeth Tayloe Corbin (daughter of John Tayloe Corbin) but had no children. Their eldest daughter Betty Tayloe Corbin (1764–1798) married Col. George Turberville (1760–1798) of Westmoreland County who received significant land patents based on his service in the Continental Army during the American Revolutionary War. Her sister Ann married William Corris Beale on December 17, 1767. Felicia Corbin (1770–1800) married first Orrick Chilton (1766–1797) of Currymont plantation in Westmoreland County, then John Chilton. The youngest daughter proved longest lived: Jane Corbin (1777–1843) married Thomas Chilton of Westmoreland County.

== Career ==
His main plantation, established by his grandfather, was called "Buckingham House". He farmed using enslaved labor.

Shortly after returning from England, Corbin accepted his first government position, as justice of the peace in Middlesex County, the justices collectively administering Virginia counties during this era. He also became county lieutenant, commanding the county militia, in December 1767. During this period, his father lobbied for his appointment as collector of customs for the upper James River district, but this Corbin instead secured a position as controller for the York River customs district (Sept.8, 1767 through October 10, 1775).

Middlesex County voters elected this Gawin Corbin as one of their representatives in the House of Burgesses in 1764, to replace Ralph Wormeley, whom lawyers ruled had a British commission as customs collector, although Wormeley argued that the intended collector was his son Ralph Wormeley V. Corbin won re-election several times, and served through June 1770, although alongside several other men in the other part-time position representing the county in Williamsburg.

On March 6, 1775, this Gawin Corbin was appointed to the Governor's Council for Virginia, replacing John Page, who had died. His family had lobbied for that appointment, which meant that both father and son served on the Council at the same time, which the royal government normally disfavored. However, the House of Burgesses only met jointly with the Governor's Council for about three weeks, as other Virginia colonists' strained relations with the crown led to Governor Lord Dunmore's suspension of the House of Burgesses. Thus this man became the last man appointed to the Governor's Council in the colonial period.

Although two of his younger brothers more clearly demonstrated their Loyalist sympathies during the American Revolutionary War, the family apparently lived quietly in Middlesex County during the conflict, possibly because of their sister's husband, Carter Braxton. This man's brother John Tayloe Corbin was briefly detained at the beginning of the American Revolutionary War, and another brother, Thomas Corbin served in the British militia before securing a commission in the regular British army after the conflict. Their youngest brother, Francis Corbin, who had remained in England completing his studies during the conflict, would also continue the family's planter and political traditions, serving in the Virginia House of Delegates and the Virginia Ratifying Convention, although losing several attempts to become a U.S. Congressman, either because of this family's perceived British sympathies, or his privately expressed discomfort with slavery, although he also farmed using enslaved labor.

== Death and legacy ==
Corbin died on his Buckingham plantation on July 19, 1779, and was buried there. He was survived by his widow (who died the next year), parents and several children. In 1829, his daughter in law and niece, Betty Tayloe Corbin would sell Buckingham. In 1941, the remaining gravestones at Buckingham plantation were moved to Christ Church.
