= William Tayloe =

William Tayloe may refer to:

- William Tayloe (planter) (1599–1655), British immigrant, colonist, and planter
- William Tayloe (the nephew) (1645–1710), his nephew, American plantation owner
- William Henry Tayloe (1799–1871), American plantation owner, horse breeder, businessman and land speculator
