= Jack Curtis =

Jack Curtis may refer to:

- Jack Curtis (actor) (1880–1956), silent film actor
- Jack Curtis (voice actor) (1926–1970), voice actor
- Jack Curtis (baseball) (1937–2025), American Major League Baseball player
- Jack Curtis (footballer, born 1888) (1888–1955), English footballer
- Jack Curtis (footballer, born 1995), English footballer
- Jack Curtis (politician) (1912–2002), American politician, Missouri senator
- Jack Curtis (World War II aviator) (1923–2009), World War II aviator and prisoner of war
- Jack Curtis, pseudonym used by David Harsent
- Jack Curtiss, pseudonym used by Jack Kirby

== See also ==
- John Curtis (disambiguation)
- Jack Curtis Dubowsky, American composer
