= John Curtis (disambiguation) =

John Curtis (born 1960) is an American politician serving as the United States senator from Utah.

John Curtis or Curtiss may also refer to:

== Politics ==
- John Curtis (burgess) (fl. 1659–1660), North American colonial British planter and politician
- John Curtis (English politician) (c. 1751–1813), English Member of Parliament for Wells, 1782–1784 and Steyning, 1791–1794
- John Curtis (Irish politician) (died 1775), Irish politician
- John A. Curtis (1834–1913), member of the Virginia House of Delegates
- John E. Curtis (1915–1999), American politician from the state of Alaska

== Sports ==
- John Curtis (baseball) (born 1948), American Major League Baseball pitcher
- John Curtiss (baseball) (born 1993), American Major League Baseball pitcher
- John Curtis (cricketer) (1887–1972), English cricketer
- John Curtis (footballer, born 1954), English former professional football player
- John Curtis (footballer, born 1978), English professional football player
- John Curtis (sailor) (born 1967), Canadian Olympic sailor

== Religion ==
- John Curtis (bishop) (1880–1962), missionary bishop in China, 1929–1950
- Barry Curtis (bishop) (John Barry Curtis, born 1933), retired Anglican bishop in Canada

== Others ==
- John Curtis (entomologist) (1791–1862), English entomologist
- John Curtis (games designer), designer of the Rolemaster game systems
- John Curtis (painter) (fl. 1790–1797), English landscape painter
- John Curtiss (Royal Air Force officer) (1924–2013), British Royal Air Force air marshal
- John C. Curtis (1845–1917), American Civil War soldier and Medal of Honor recipient
- John Green Curtis (1844–1913), American physiologist
- John Shelton Curtiss (1899–1983), American historian
- John Thomas Curtis (1913–1961), American botanist and plant ecologist

== See also ==
- John Curtice (born 1953), British political scientist
- Jack Curtis (disambiguation)
- John Curteys (disambiguation)
