= Gawin Corbin (burgess) =

Virginia planter and politician)

Member of the House of Burgesses for King and Queen County
- In office 1736–1740 Serving with John Robinson
- Preceded by: George Braxton
- Succeeded by: George Braxton
- In office 1715–1715 Serving with William Bird
- Preceded by: John Holloway
- Succeeded by: George Braxton

Member of the House of Burgesses for Middlesex County
- In office 1698–1705 Serving with Robert Dudley, Edwin Thacker, William Churchill
- Preceded by: Mathew Kemp
- Succeeded by: John Robinson

Personal details
- Born: 1669 Middlesex County, Colony of Virginia
- Died: January 1, 1745 (aged 75–76) Peckatone plantation, King and Queen County, Colony of Virginia
- Spouse(s): Catherine Wormeley, Jane Lane, Martha Bassett
- Relations: Henry Corbin (father)
- Children: Richard, Gawin, John
- Occupation: planter, politician

Gawin Corbin (1669-1745) was a Virginia planter, militia officer, customs collector and politician who served in the House of Burgesses representing at various times Middlesex and King and Queen County. Two descendants of the same name would also serve in the House of Burgesses, Gawin Corbin Sr. and Gawin Corbin Jr.

== Early and family life ==
Coat of arms of Henry Corbin

Born to the widowed Alice Eltonhead Burnham and her British emigrant husband Henry Corbin (circa 1628-January 1676/77) who served on the Governor's Council of the Colony of Virginia, the boy was connected to the planter elite of the Mid-Atlantic colonies of Virginia and Maryland. His father had been loyal to the exiled King Charles I, as was his maternal grandfather. That Henry Corbin who sailed to Virginia on the ship "Charity" in 1654 had been the third son born to Thomas and Winifred Corbin of "Hall End" in Warwickshire, England. While his eldest brother (also Thomas) inherited the English estate, the second brother would marry the daughter of an English merchant in Ypres and die in the West Indies. This boy's fourth uncle was a London merchant with the same name Gawin, and who died at Yelverton in Norfolk County, England in 1709.

His maternal grandfather Richard Eltonhead of "Eltonhead" estate in Lancashire, England had been a Cavalier, or partisan of the exiled King Charles I. His son (this boy's uncle) William Eltonhead died in 1655 in a skirmish attempting to establish the New Albion colony north of the Maryland colony (in which he had many political connections. Three of his maternal aunts had married members of the Virginia governor's council who lived in Middlesex County, Virginia

His parents had married before January 1656 and had sons named Henry (b.1667 but who never reached adulthood) and Thomas (1658-1736, who never married) before this boy's birth. The family also included at least five daughters who married Virginia gentry: Letitia (1657-1706), Alice (1660-1713), Winifred (1661-1711), Ann (1664-1694) and Frances (d. 1713). Letitia married Richard Lee II, whose Westmoreland County estate bordered the Peckatone plantation. Alice married Philip Lightfoot of Charles City County, and their son of the same name would serve on the Virginia Governor's Council. Winifred married Col. LeRoy Griffin of Rappahanock County, and their son Thomas Griffin would serve as a burgess for Richmond County. Ann married Col. William Tayloe of Tayloe's Quarter, what would become Mount Airy in Richmond County, and Frances married the colony's attorney general and York County planter Edmund Jenings.

His father had first settled on the south side of the Rappahannock River which was then in Lancaster County but later became part of Middlesex County. His father's wealth gave rise to a local saying "rich as Corbin", but he died when Gawin was seven and his brother Thomas was eight years old. Henry Corbyn's will named the boys' guardians as the colony's lieutenant governor, Sir Henry Chicheley and two fellow members of the King's Council, Ralph Wormely and Colonel Ludwell. They sent the boys to England to be raised by their paternal grandmother. Also, they had an uncle of the same name as this boy, who was a London merchant and lived at a home called "Hall End" in Polesworth in Warwickshire. That merchant with the London Company built an 80 ton ship named "Virginia Berkeley" for trade with the colony. Although his father signed his surname "Corbin" and his uncle spelled his name "Gawayne", this man and his progeny generally used "Corbin" and "Gawin".

== Career ==
His father acquired several valuable properties between the Mattaponi and Rappahannock Rivers that became plantations known as Peckatone, Nesting, Machotick, Jones Farm, Gales, Corbin Hall and Buckingham, although the names of the counties in which they were located changed as populations increased. This man also acquired land by marriage, as discussed below, as well as by paying for the transportation of immigrants to the Virginia Colony. The plantations operated using indentured, and increasingly using enslaved labor. His will mentions giving his eldest son and executor Richard 50 slaves, and his youngest son Gawin was to receive the slaves given to his mother by her father (who was also to be one of his grandson's guardians until he reached legal age). Initially, this Corbin lived at Buckingham plantation in Middlesex County, but he moved to a plantation he called "Laneville" to honor his second wife in King and Queen County. He also developed the Peckatone plantation further upstream on the Rappahannock River watershed in Westmoreland County, where he died.

By 1698 Gawin Corbin was one of the justice of the peace for Middlesex county, and later served as the county lieutenant, responsible for military defense.

Middlesex County voters elected him as one of their representatives in the House of Burgesses in 1698 and re-elected him several times until 1705, when he became ineligible for legislative office because he had accepted a royal appointment as naval officer for the Rappahannock River district (a lucrative position financed by a percentage of the tax on tobacco exports). King and Queen county voters elected Corbin to represent him in 1715, and twenty years later, in 1736 (unless his youngest son, who shared his name was born considerably earlier than 1725).

== Personal life ==
This Gawin Corbin first married his cousin Catherine Wormeley (1679-before 1707), the daughter of the colony's secretary of state Ralph Wormeley Jr. and his wife, the former Agatha Eltonhead. They had no surviving children. After her death, Corbin married Jane Lane Wilson (who died after 1715), the daughter of Captain John Lane of York County and widow of William Wilson of Elizabeth City County. She bore at least five children, including Richard Corbin (1714-1790), John Corbin (1715-1757) and at least three daughters. Ann married (and became the widow of) Isaac Allerton of Westmoreland County, then the wife of Rev. David Currie of Christ Church parish in Lancaster County). Daughter Alice married Benjamin Needler (clerk of the Governor's Council) but died in 1741, before her father; she may have shared the name of another daughter who died as a child; her sister Felicia died without marrying. Although one genealogist was unsure which wife was the mother of that Alice or of Jane (Jennie; 1715-1760) who married John Bushrod of Westmoreland County, the birthdate suggests the mother died giving birth to fraternal twins. His third wife was Martha Bassett (1694-1738). She was the daughter of Colonel William Bassett (1671–1723) of New Kent County, a member of the governor's council. Although some speculate that Jane Lane bore all of this man's children, others deduce this Martha as the mother of Corbin's youngest son also named Gawin, in part because he named his daughter Martha, which was not a name used by the Corbins nor Lanes. Gawin continued the family's planter and political traditions and married Hannah Lee who caused scandals after his accidental death in 1760. His daughter Martha (1749-1809) married a cousin, merchant Robert Tucker of Norfolk.

== Death and legacy ==
Although he wrote his will in 1739, Col. Corbin died on his Peckatone plantation on New Year's Day in the winter of 1744/45 (the actual day affected by adoption of the Julian calendar). His will was admitted to probate on February 12, 1745. He was probably buried on that plantation, and the family graveyard there remains. He provided that his eldest son, Richard, who had made his home at the "Laneville" plantation and would serve both in the House of Burgesses and on the Governor's Council, received lands in Middlesex county, adjoining King and Queen county and 6000 acres upriver in Spotsylvania County. His son John Corbin resided at "Portobago" plantation in Essex County and served as justice of the peace in that county, and received significant lands in Spotsylvania County, but did not seek other public office and so may be best known for marrying the daughter of London merchant Richard Lee (granddaughter of Letitia Corbin Lee) or for siring sons who continued the family's political tradition. This man's youngest son, Gawin (1725-1750), whose guardians were named in that will, received the Peckatone plantation and lands in Westmoreland, Lancaster, King George, Prince William and Spotsylvania counties, and succeeded his father in the House of Burgesses. However, he died three years after his marriage to Hannah Lee Corbin.
