= Philip Lee Sr. =

Colonial American naval officer and judge (1681–1744)

Philip 'Corbin' Lee

Member of the Upper House of the Maryland General Assembly
- In office 1725-1744

Member of the Lower House of the Maryland General Assembly representing Prince George's County
- In office 1708-1722

Personal details
- Born: 1681 "Machodoc" plantation, Westmoreland County, Virginia
- Died: April 1744 (aged 62–63)
- Parent(s): Richard Lee II; Laetitia Corbin
- Occupation: planter, officer, politician

Lee family coat of arms

Brooke family coat of arms

Philip 'Corbin' Lee (1681–1744), born to the prominent Lee family of Virginia, became a planter in Maryland as well as naval officer and served in both houses of the Maryland General Assembly. He is sometimes considered the forebear of the Maryland or Blenheim Lees, although that manor house was built by his successors. The middle name "Corbin" is a posthumously added matriname used to avoid confusion with the numerous other Lee men named Philip, such as his nephew Philip Ludwell Lee, the eldest son of his brother Thomas Lee, who built Stratford Hall in Westmoreland County, Virginia.

== Early and family life ==
The second son born to Laetitia Corbin (c. 1657-1706) and her husband Colonel Richard Lee II (1647–1715), at his father's "Machodoc" plantation in Westmoreland County. Both his maternal grandfather Henry Corbin and his paternal grandfather Richard Lee I, were British merchants who came to own large tracts of land in the Virginia colony and had seats on the Virginia Governor's Council, as would this man's younger brother Thomas and successor generations. His eldest brother, Richard Lee III, remained in England after his education and became a merchant with his uncle Thomas Corbin as the firm of Corbin and Lee. They handled tobacco sent from the family's vast plantations in Maryland and Virginia (as well as from others) and shipped manufactured goods back. His younger brother Francis Lee became a physician.

== Career ==
=== Local and colonial officeholder ===
After the Board of Trade assumed responsibility for colonial operations and separated operations for the Colony of Virginia (where his father served on the Governor's Council), Philip Lee moved to the Province of Maryland in about 1700, and six years later married his first wife, Sarah Brooke, daughter of a member of the Maryland Governor's Council (this and a later marriage discussed separately below).

Lee was commissioned a captain in the local Prince George's County militia in 1708. By 1710 he was one of the seven Justices of the Peace who adjudicated and administered the county, a position he would hold for at least a decade, although rarely present at sessions after the courthouse was moved from Charlestown to Upper Marlboro, Maryland in 1821. In 1722 Lee accepted the governor's appointment as the local Sheriff (1722–1725). Three years later this man's eldest son, Richard Lee, succeeded Robert Tyler as sheriff, and by 1732 that son was regularly attending court sessions, although this man (or his son of the same name who predeceased him) again served as sheriff in the mid-1730s.

Prince George's county voters elected Philip Lee to represent them in the Lower House of the General Assembly in 1708, and re-elected him until 1722, when he became ineligible for that part-time office because he had become the county sheriff. From 1725 until his death, Lee was a member of the Upper House (also called the colony's King's Council, similar to that on which his father and later brother sat in Virginia). In 1732 his fellow councilors were Charles Calvert, John Hall, Col. Richard Tilghman, Col. Mathew Tilghman Ward, John Rousby, Benjamin Tasker and George Plater. Lee was a Justice of the Provincial Court from 1726–1732, and Associate Commissary General in 1727, and the Naval Officer for the North Potomac district from 1727-1744. His father had been naval officer of the South Potomac district, which lucrative position was successively held by his brothers Thomas and Henry, then Henry's son Richard Squire Lee.

=== Planter ===
Lee was a planter, who farmed tobacco and other crops using enslaved labor. At the time of his death, Lee owned some 2,467 acres (9.98 km^{2}) and his estate was valued at 4,240 pounds of current money, including 87 slaves, 2 servants, 185 oz. old silver, 1 yawl, and books. His home plantation in Prince George's County was called "Nottingham" plantation, and he also owned plantations in adjacent Charles County and Dorchester County on the other side of Cheseapeake Bay (on Maryland's Eastern Shore).

His father died about fourteen years after Lee's move to Maryland, and this man eventually inherited a tract of land along the Potomac River at Cedar Point called "Lee's Purchase" plantation in Charles County. However, a tenant with a sole and exclusive contract occupied the property between 1705 and 1718, when Lee finally gained legal title to the land, after the Provincial Court finally settled a dispute between his late father and another claimant to the land. After this man's death, Blenheim plantation would be developed there, and became the seat of the Lee Family of Maryland, also known as the "Blenheim Lees."

== Personal life ==
Lee married twice. His first wife was Maryland heiress Sarah Brooke, whose father Thomas Brooke (1632–1676) sat on the Governor's Council and whose mother was Barbara Addison. Before her death in November 1724, they had at least eight children, including three or five sons. Richard Lee (d. 1787-1789) married a woman named Grace and had a son Philip T. Lee who married a Miss Russell but died before his father in 1778. The second son, Thomas Lee (d. 1749) married a Miss Sim and had a son Thomas Sim Lee (1745–1819) who served in the Patriot cause during the American Revolutionary War and twice as Maryland's governor. Her will made her brother Thomas Brooke Jr. executor on behalf of her youngest son, Arthur Lee, who inherited land along Rock Creek (some of which is now in Washington, D.C.) that was given to her by her father. Francis Jr and Philip Lee, if they were sons of Sarah Brooks, did not survive their father. After her death Philip Lee married the young widow Elizabeth Sewell, widow of Henry Sewall of St. Mary's County, Maryland, who bore nine children of this marriage. Philip Lee also agreed to raise her then seven-year-old son (his stepson) Nicholas Sewell. Philip Lee's will specifically gives his widow three male and three female Negro slaves and certain land unless she converts to Catholicism or marries, and names their children as Leticie [sic], Elizabeth, Alice, Hancock, Corbin, John, George and Margaret. The will also orders his son Richard to allow his brother Arthur the land given to him by their mother, and in addition to devising land to sons Hancock Lee, John Lee and Corbin Lee, and a grandson named Philip Lee. One genealogist believes this grandson was the son of son Philip Lee who died before his father but after marrying a woman named Grace who bore and named this grandson.

== Death and legacy ==
Lee died in April 1744, and his will was recorded in Charles County on May 1, 1744. At this date there was a one-room-and-loft dwelling in Charles County which doubled as Lee's naval office. Lee's home plantation was his Prince George's County seat, where all of his children were undoubtedly born.
