= Lawrence Jenkins =

Lawrence or Larry Jenkins may refer to:

- Lawrence Hugh Jenkins (1857–1928), British judge in India
- Lawrence L. Jenkins (1924–2017), American World War II pilot and prisoner of war
- Larry "Flash" Jenkins (1955–2019), American film actor, director, producer, and screenwriter
