= Charles Varlo =

English agriculturist

Charles Varlo or Varley (c.1725–c.1795) was an English agriculturist. He held papers pertaining to the failed colony of New Albion.

== Life ==
He was born in Yorkshire about 1725. He visited Ireland in his twenty-first year, spending some time with Edward Synge, bishop of Elphin. He was instrumental in the introduction there of the farming of flax. He is said to have received from the linen board a premium of £100 for the quality of flax raised under his management.

In 1748 he would seem to have been farming on his own account in County Leitrim, and to have been also an early experimenter in turnip husbandry, then becoming prominent. Aged 26 he married, and began as a farmer and grazier in Ireland on a large scale. He introduced the Rotherham plough, patented in 1730, by Stanyforth & Foljambe of Rotherham.

In 1760 the prohibition on the export of Irish cattle to England was removed. Varlo accordingly sold his land in Ireland, and brought his cattle over to England. The step was, however, very unpopular. Varlo's cattle were slaughtered by the mob in the streets of Dublin, and he himself had a very narrow escape. A small compensation was given to him by the government at the instance of the Duke of Bedford, then lord lieutenant, and he appears to have begun grazing in England, probably in Yorkshire. In 1764 he finished a machine that harrowed, sowed, and rolled at the same time, for which he received a premium from the Dublin Society. Another invention was a winnowing machine which he perfected in 1772. A third invention was ‘a machine for taking off friction.’

In 1784 he was living in Sloane Square. At this date occurred a strange incident. He had got possession of certain papers and charters purporting to have been granted by Charles I to Sir Edmund Plowden, and entitling him to colonise New Albion (i.e. New Jersey). This attempt at colonisation proved abortive, and in Charles II's reign the charter was superseded by a new grant to James, Duke of York. Armed with his papers (which were probably forgeries), Varlo went out to the American colonies (the independence of which had just been recognised by Britain), expecting apparently to be acknowledged as governor of the province of New Jersey and as lessee of one-third of the territory. The case was tried before the colonial courts, and Varlo's claim was dismissed. Varlo printed his documents in America in a pamphlet of thirty pages, containing (1) ‘The Grant of Charles I to Sir E. Plowden, Earl Palatine of Albion’ (apparently a transcript with alterations of the grant to Lord Baltimore); (2) ‘The Lease from the Earl Palatine to Sir T. Danby [Sir Thomas Danby];’ (3) ‘The Release of the Co-Grantees to the Earl Palatine;’ and (4) ‘The Address of the Earl Palatine to the Public.’

Only two copies of Varlo's original pamphlet are known to exist, one of which is in the Boston (U.S.A.) Athenæum. Hazard considered the papers to be sufficiently authentic to be introduced into his collection of state papers (vol. i.)

Varlo also took a twelve months' tour through the states of New England, Maryland, and Virginia (where he met George Washington). On his return to England he petitioned the king and the Prince of Wales in the hope of getting some of the money granted to American loyalists. The last trace of him is on 24 February 1795, when he was living in Southampton Row, New Road, Paddington, where Sir John Sinclair sent a formal letter of thanks for certain suggestions made by Varlo to the Board of Agriculture on premiums for the cultivation of maize. Varlo must have been over seventy at this time.

== Works ==
Varlo wrote:

- The Yorkshire Farmer, a work chiefly concerned with the cultivation of corn and flax. Some of the opinions given in this book he renounced later (New System, i. 18).
- A New System of Husbandry, from Experiments never before made public, York, 1770, 3 vols. Two further editions were published prior to 1773, one of these at Winchester. In 1774 a fourth edition was issued in London, and in 1785 a fifth in Boston, U.S.A. (Catalogue of the Boston Athenæum). This work of Varlo's evinces a wide acquaintance with different parts of the United Kingdom; in fact Varlo appears, like Arthur Young (1741–1820), only in a less degree, to have conducted regular agricultural tours (New System, iii. 227, 300). Varlo is to some extent a disciple of Jethro Tull (iii. 97).
- Schemes offered for the Perusal and Consideration of the Legislature, Freeholders, and Public in General … by C. Varlo, Esq., 1775. It is probably to this work that Varlo refers when he says that he published a book called ‘Political Schemes’ in 1772. This covers to a large extent the same points as are mooted in the ‘Husbandry,’ and also enlarges on the advantages of a general enclosure act (for, though Varlo was one of the most spirited defenders of the open-field husbandry, he was in favour of a general act for the enclosure of waste and untilled land).
- Nature Displayed: a New Work by different Gentlemen on several Subjects; Lectures on Philosophy; a Twelve Months' Tour of Observations through America, also Political Hints offered to the Legislature, 3rd ed. 1793; new ed. 1796.
- Floating Ideas of Nature, suited to the Philosopher, Farmer, and Mechanic, 1796, 2 vols.

These later works of Varlo are agricultural miscellanies, the greater part of the material for which is taken literally from his earlier writings. Whatever new matter there is chiefly relates to America, and especially to American agriculture, an account of Varlo's travels, and proposals to introduce into England certain details of American farm management, such as the cultivation of maize or the stabling of horses without litter.
