= Senator Curtis =

Senator Curtis may refer to:

== Members of the United States Senate ==
- Carl Curtis (1905–2000), U.S. Senator from Nebraska from 1955 to 1979
- Charles Curtis (1860–1936), U.S. Senator from Kansas from 1907 to 1913 and from 1915 to 1929
- John Curtis (born 1960), U.S. Senator from Utah

== United States state senate members ==
- David L. Curtis (born 1947), North Carolina State Senate
- Edward C. Curtis (1865–1920), Illinois State Senate
- Jack Curtis (politician) (1912–2002), Missouri State Senate
- James C. Curtis (1797–1881), New York State Senate
- Julius Curtis (1825–1907), Connecticut State Senate
- Laurence Curtis (1893–1989), Massachusetts State Senate
- Aubyn Curtiss (1925–2017), Montana State Senate
- H. W. Curtiss (1824–1902), Ohio State Senate
