= Thomas G. Corbin =

American naval officer (1820–1901)

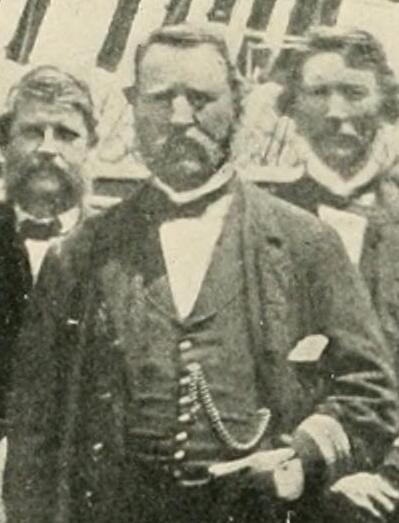
- Lieutenant Corbin (center) of the Wabash in 1862
- Born: Thomas Grosvenor Corbin; August 13, 1820; Reeds plantation, Caroline County, Virginia, U.S.
- Died: December 17, 1901 (aged 81); Philadelphia, Pennsylvania, U.S.
- Burial place: Hollywood Cemetery, Richmond, Virginia, U.S.
- Relatives: Francis Corbin (father); Robert B. Corbin (brother)
- Military career
- Allegiance: United States
- Branch: U.S. Navy
- Service years: 1839–1874
- Rank: Commodore
- Unit: USS Augusta
- Conflicts: American Civil War Union blockade

Thomas Grosvenor Corbin (August 13, 1820 – December 17, 1901) was a career United States Navy officer who remained loyal to the Union during the American Civil War. During the war, he served as the commandant of midshipmen at the U.S. Naval Academy and commanded a ship in the Union blockade of southern ports. Although he never married, he had many relatives, including military members, across the United States, so his relation to Air Force Major General Thomas Goldsborough Corbin (1917–1992) is unclear.

== Early and family life ==
Corbin was born August 13, 1820, at Reeds plantation in Caroline County, Virginia, the youngest of six sons and two daughters of the former Ann Munford Beverley (1778–1830) and her planter husband Francis Corbin (1760–1795). Both sides of his family were of the First Families of Virginia. His father's family could trace their descent to Henry Corbyn, who with his descendants (many of whom had served in the House of Burgesses and Virginia Governor's Council) patented vast acreage on the Rappahannock River watershed.

His mother's family was perhaps even more distinguished and reliant on enslaved labor. Her father Robert Beverley (1740–1800) represented Essex County for one term in the Virginia House of Delegates. His wife, Anna Munford Beverley, was the daughter of burgess Robert Beverley and his wife, Maria Carter, daughter of powerful planter Landon Carter, and granddaughter of "King" Carter. Corbin's father, who was studying in England during the American Revolutionary War, returned to Middlesex County and was elected to represent that county in the Virginia House of Delegates and in the Virginia Ratifying Convention, but lost three attempts to be elected to the U.S. House of Representatives - perhaps due to his uncles' Loyalist connections during the American Revolutionary War. Around 1795, his father moved to Caroline County where he operated "Reeds" plantation, and in December of that year married Corbin's mother. The plantation grew to 3700 acres and included 70 enslaved persons, although his father also wrote to his friend James Madison of his misgivings concerning slavery and desire to move to a New England state without it. However, Corbin's father died when he was about a year old.

His eldest brother, Robert Beverley Corbin (died 1868), inherited the Reeds plantation and probably began to raise him, marrying his first wife, a woman from Philadelphia, in 1822. However, she died in childbirth and the boy was raised by his maternal grandparents after their father's remarriage and took their surname, Dr. Francis Sims. Robert B. Corbin also repeated part of their father's career by representing Caroline County in the Virginia House of Delegates, and serving as colonel of the county militia. The second eldest brother, Francis Porteus Corbin (1801–1876) married a Philadelphia heiress and died in Paris, France, although their son, Richard Washington Corbin after education in England, returned to Virginia to serve on the staff of CSA General Fields. John Sawbridge Corbin (d. 1883) married Mary Blackwell and lived at "The Glimpse" in Hanover County. Their sister Anna Page Corbin (1803–1885) married Benjamin Franklin Randolph (1803–1889) of Culpepper, Virginia. The youngest daughter, Jane Virginia Corbin (1815–1904), and brothers William Lygon Corbin (died 1883) and Washington Shirley Corbin (died 1877) likewise never married. Their cousin Major Richard Corbin of Laneville had been a member of the Virginia House of Delegates before Corbin's birth and raised an artillery company and served with distinction in the War of 1812, as would Major Gawin Lane Corbin of King's Creek plantation in York County.

== Military career ==
Appointed from Alabama on May 15, 1838, Corbin was attached to the frigate Brandywine with the Mediterranean Squadron from 1838 to 1842. Promoted to passed midshipman on May 20, 1844, Corbin served with the United States Coast Survey from 1844 to 1845. He was with the frigate Columbia with the Brazil Squadron from 1845 to 1846 and then returned to the U.S. Coast Survey from 1847 to 1850. Corbin was with the Sloop-of-war St. Mary's of the Pacific Squadron from 1850 to 1852.

Corbin was promoted to lieutenant on June 10, 1852, and served aboard the steamer Princeton from 1852 to 1853. He conducted a survey of the Río de la Plata from 1853 to 1855, then was stationed at the Mare Island Navy Yard, Mare Island, California, from 1855 to 1856 and on the receiving ship at New York City from 1857 to 1858.

Corbin subsequently served as Executive Officer of the steam-frigate Wabash with the Mediterranean Squadron from 1858 to 1859. In 1860 he was on leave and lived in a boarding house in Philadelphia. He returned to the Wabash in 1861, which had been reassigned to the South Atlantic Blockading Squadron after the outbreak of the American Civil War. Corbin participated in the capture of Fort Beauregard in Louisiana, Fort Walker outside Atlanta, Georgia, and Port Royal in South Carolina in April 1861. Corbin served aboard the Wabash until 1863.

Corbin was promoted to commander on July 16, 1862. He served as Commandant of Midshipmen at the United States Naval Academy in 1863. He commanded the steamer USS Augusta from 1864 to 1865 and was fleet captain of the West India Squadron enforcing the Union blockade from 1865 to 1866.

Following the war, with a commission as captain, he sailed his last cruise on the flagship Guierriere, of the South Atlantic squadron, in 1868. He spent his final years in service at the ordinance depot in Philadelphia. Commodore Corbin retired in January 1874, having served for 21 at sea and 7 years on land.

== Death and legacy ==
Corbin died at his nephew's house in Philadelphia on December 17, 1901, and his remains were returned to Virginia for burial at Hollywood cemetery in Richmond.

He died without a will, and with a substantial estate of stocks and bonds worth over $763,000. Complications ensued when the state of Alabama filed documents affecting the share of one of his heirs at law, Francis Corbin Randolph, who had been an elected Alabama probate judge who disappeared, possibly to become a soldier of fortune in a South American conflict between Columbia and Venezuela, whereupon the accounts of monies for liquor licenses were audited and $25,000 seemingly embezzled.
