= Robert Corbin =

Robert Corbin may refer to:

- Robert Corbin (Guyanese politician) (1948–2026), Guyanese politician
- Robert K. Corbin (1928–2025), American lawyer and politician from Arizona
- Robert B. Corbin (1796–1868), American planter, officer and politician from Virginia
- Bob Corbin (1922–2013), member of the Ohio House of Representatives
- Bob Corbin (songwriter) (1951–2023), musician with American country music group Corbin/Hanner
