= John Curteys =

John Curteys may refer to:

- John Curteys (MP for Marlborough) (fl. 1388–1395), carpenter and MP
- John Curteys (MP for Lostwithiel) (fl. 1389–1413), MP and mayor of Lostwithiel

== See also ==
- John Curtis (disambiguation)
