= Robert B. Corbin =

American politician (1796–1968)

Member of the Virginia House of Delegates for Caroline County, Virginia
- In office January 1, 1838 – December 5, 1841
- Preceded by: Archibald Samuel
- Succeeded by: Archibald Samuel

Personal details
- Born: Robert Beverly Corbin; 1796 Reeds plantation, Caroline County, Virginia
- Died: April 3, 1868 (aged 71–72) Philadelphia, Pennsylvania
- Resting place: St. Peter's Episcopal Church, Philadelphia
- Spouse(s): Caroline Rebecca Heath Sims; Mary Cooper Mills
- Children: at least 5
- Parent(s): Francis Corbin, Ann Munford Beverley
- Relatives: Richard Corbin (grandfather); Thomas G. Corbin (brother); Gawin Lane Corbin, Richard Corbin(uncles)
- Occupation: planter, officer, politician

Robert Beverly Corbin (1796 – April 3, 1868) was a Virginia planter, officer and politician who thrice represented Caroline County in the Virginia House of Delegates .

== Early and family life ==
The eldest son of Francis Corbin and his wife Ann Munford Beverly, was born to the First Families of Virginia. Both his paternal and maternal ancestors had emigrated from England and become gentry in the Virginia colony. Many served in the Virginia General Assembly (including his father), as they also operated plantations using enslaved labor. He had five brothers, of whom two married. Francis Porteous Corbin married a Georgia heiress in Philadelphia but lived most of his live in Paris, and his two daughters married French nobleman but his son Richard Washington Corbin (1839-1922) returned to Virginia to fight for the Confederacy. Another brother, John Sawbridge Corbin (d. 1883) married Mary Blackwell and became a planter in Hanover County, Virginia. Their brothers William Lygon Corbin (1809-1885), Washington Shirley Corbin (d. 1877) and Thomas Grosvenor Corbin (1820-1901) never married, nor did the youngest sister Jane Virginia Corbin (1815-1904). Like his brothers, Robert B. Corbin received a private education appropriate to his class.

== Career ==
Upon his father's death in 1821, Corbin assumed responsibility for his mother and younger siblings, as well as operated his home plantation using enslaved labor. In the 1830 census, he owned 98 enslaved people. A decade later, he owned 109 slaves. In the 1850 federal census, Corbin owned 88 enslaved people in Caroline County. In the 1860 federal census, he is listed as a farmer and his children listed, but either he freed all his slaves or the corresponding slave schedule may have been lost.

Caroline county voters elected Corbin as their representative in the Virginia House of Delegates in 1837, and re-elected him four times.

== Personal life ==
Corbin first married Caroline Rebecca Heath Sims (1801-1829), daughter of Joseph Sims of Philadelphia. She bore four sons before her death following the fourth birth, of whom only the firstborn survived infancy. Dr. Francis Sims Corbin (1825-) would be raised by his otherwise heirless grandparents and adopt their surname) survived. After a decade, Corbin remarried, to Mary Cooper Mills, daughter of Nicholas Mills of Richmond, Virginia. She gave birth to two daughters and two sons, before dying in 1852 following the birth of their second son. Both Nicholas Mills Corbin (1842-1915) and Charles Mills Corbin (1852-1908) reached adulthood and survived the American Civil War, but neither married. Their sister Sally Mills Corbin (1840-1907) married Charles Britton Vaden of Richmond, and Anna Munford Corbin (1845-1902) married William Harrison Brander of Richmond.

== Death and legacy ==
At some time before or during the American Civil War, the widower Corbin moved to Philadelphia, where he died on April 3, 1868, and was buried in the churchyard of historic St. Peter's Episcopal Church. He was the last man with the Corbin surname to serve in the Virginia General Assembly.
