= John Curtis (burgess) =

English planter and Virginia politician

Member of the House of Burgesses for Lancaster County
- In office 1659–1660 Serving with John Carter, Henry Corbin

Personal details
- Parent(s): Major Thomas Curtis, Averilla Curtis
- Occupation: Planter, politician

John Curtis or Curtys (fl. 1660) was a planter from England and politician who served one term in the House of Burgesses.

== Early and family life ==
Thomas Curtis sailed from England to the Jamestown colony. He lived in what had become Elizabeth City County, and speculated in real estate throughout what had become the Virginia colony. He had several children by his second wife, Averilla, including John.

== Career ==
John Curtis served as a third burgess representing Lancaster County in the 1659-1660 Virginia General Assembly session, alongside major landowners and legislative veterans John Carter and Henry Corbyn (or Corbin). Neither Thomas nor John Curtis (or Curtys) show in the few surviving early tax records for Lancaster County, except for the year 1668, when John Curtys who lived on the south side of the Rappahannock River (which the next year became Middlesex County) paid taxes for seven tithables (compared to Henry Corbin, Esq. with 18 tithables in the same area and Col. John Carter with 58 tithables on the river's north side). Of roughly 190 Lancaster County taxpayers in 1668, only 13 men on the south side of the Rappahannock and 9 men on the river's north side paid for more tithables than Curtys. Before Middlesex County's creation, in 1665, Curtis was a churchwarden and tried to collect levies and build chapels of ease in the county as well as hire a priest to serve Christ Church parish, possibly in 1659 when the rector died. That his tithables may have included slaves is indicated by the records of the estate of John Curtis who died in 1741, possibly his son or grandson, who had owned six Blacks in 1734, but only two men (38 years old and over 60 years old) at the time of his death.
