= Jack Curtis (World War II aviator) =

Jack Clifford Curtis
- Born: July 26, 1923; Charlotte, Michigan
- Died: May 24, 2009 (aged 85); Battle Creek, Michigan
- Burial place: Battle Creek, Michigan
- Military career
- Allegiance: United States of America
- Branch: United States Army Air Forces
- Service years: 1942-1947
- Rank: Captain
- Unit: 514th Bomb Squadron, 376th Bomb Group
- Conflicts: World War II
- Awards: Purple Heart; Air Medal
- Other work: Kellogg's (1947–1990)

Jack C. Curtis (July 26, 1923 – May 24, 2009) was a B-24 navigator during World War II who spent over eight months as a prisoner of war. His exploits were chronicled, along with those of his friend and fellow POW, Lawrence Jenkins, in the 2007 book, Eagles' Wings, An Uncommon Story of World War II, by Andrew Layton.

== Biography ==
A lifelong resident of Battle Creek, Jack Curtis was born on July 26, 1923. He left his night-time job at Kellogg's to enlist in the Army Air Corps when World War II broke out. Assigned to Aviation Cadet school, Curtis would become a Navigator on B-24 "Liberators" with the 376th Bomb Group, stationed in Southern Italy.

By late 1944, Jack had become a seasoned combat veteran with more than 30 successful bombing missions to his credit. However, it was the 31st that would prove to be his most memorable. While flying over Marburg, Yugoslavia, his aircraft took a mortal hit that killed seven of its eleven crewmembers. Jack escaped, but not without great injury. His left femur was shattered by shrapnel, and the harrowing parachute jump only served to compound his wounds.

After being captured by a German infantry detachment, Curtis would spend eight months in various Austrian prison facilities. He was finally liberated and sent back to the United States where he would receive medical care at Percy Jones Army Hospital in his hometown of Battle Creek. Among the close friends he made as a patient there were future US Senators Bob Dole and Daniel Inouye.

Following the war, Curtis graduated from Albion College and returned to his job at Kellogg's. he eventually retired as an executive of industrial relations after 43 years of service. Mr. Curtis was also involved with many volunteer and service organizations including the Southwest Michigan Food Bank, of which he is a founder.

Captain Curtis's military awards and decorations include the Purple Heart, the Air Medal (with 6 Oak Leaf Clusters), the POW Medal, the American Campaign Medal, the ETO Campaign Medal (with 7 Battle Stars), the World War II Victory Medal and the British POW Medal.
