= John Curtis (painter) =

English landscape painter

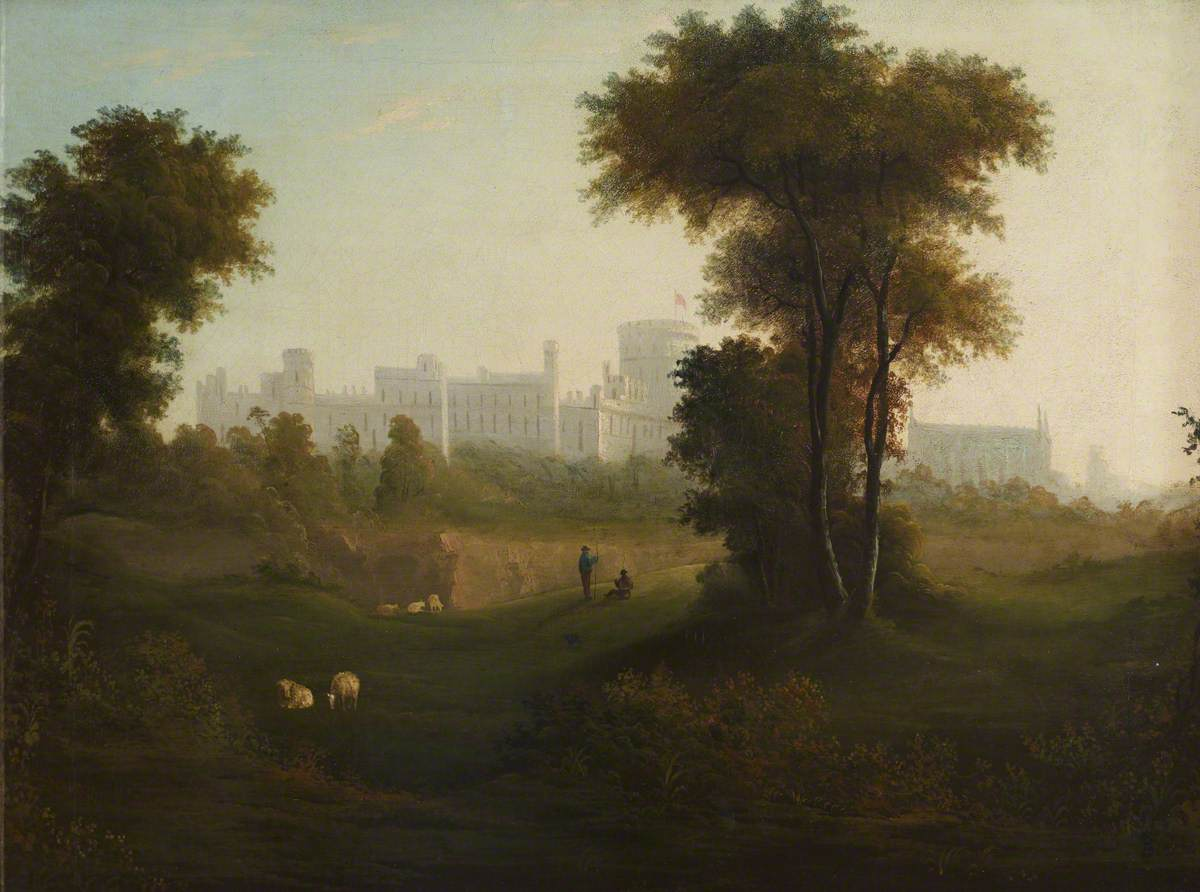
A View of Windsor Castle, attributed to John Curtis (c. 1790–1821)

John Curtis (fl. 1790–1797) was an English landscape painter.

== Career ==
John Curtis was a pupil of William Marlow at Twickenham. In 1790 he exhibited at the Royal Academy A View of Netley Abbey, and was an occasional exhibitor in the following years. In 1797 he departed from his usual style, exhibiting a picture of the Indefatigable and Amazon frigates under Sir Edward Pellew engaging Les Droits de l'Homme, a French seventy-four. Nothing is known of his subsequent career. Some of his views were engraved.

== Sources ==
- Cust, L. H.; Lambert, R. J. (2004). "Curtis, John (fl. 1790–1797), landscape painter". Oxford Dictionary of National Biography. Oxford University Press. Retrieved 16 September 2022.
- Graves, Algernon (1884). A Dictionary of Artists Who Have Exhibited Works in the Principal London Exhibitions of Oil Paintings From 1760 to 1880. London: George Bell and Sons. p. 59.
- Oliver, Valerie Cassel, ed. (2011). "Curtis, John". Benezit Dictionary of Artists. Oxford University Press. Retrieved 16 September 2022.
- Redgrave, Samuel (1878). "Curtis, John". A Dictionary of Artists of the English School. New ed. London: George Bell and Sons. p. 110.
- "John Curtis". The British Museum. Retrieved 16 September 2022.

Attribution:

- This article incorporates text from a publication now in the public domain: Cust, Lionel Henry (1888). "Curtis, John". In Stephen, Leslie (ed.). Dictionary of National Biography. Vol. 13. London: Smith, Elder & Co. pp. 347–347.
