= Lawrence L. Jenkins =

US military pilot and prisoner of war

- Born: January 29, 1924; Jackson, Michigan
- Died: May 28, 2017 (aged 93); Battle Creek, Michigan
- Military career
- Allegiance: United States of America
- Branch: United States Army Air Forces
- Service years: 1942–1947
- Rank: Captain
- Nicknames: "Larry", "Jenks", "Junior"
- Unit: 96th Bomb Squadron, 2nd Bomb Group
- Conflicts: World War II
- Awards: Distinguished Flying Cross; Purple Heart; Air Medal

Lawrence L. "Larry" Jenkins (January 29, 1924 – May 28, 2017) was a B-17 co-pilot during World War II who spent over ten months as a prisoner of war. His exploits were chronicled, along with those of his friend and fellow POW Jack Curtis, in the 2007 book, Eagles' Wings, An Uncommon Story of World War II, by Andrew Layton.

== Career ==
On the United States' entry into World War II, Jenkins enlisted in the US Army Air Corps. After an initial assignment as a sheet-metal smith, he was accepted into the Aviation Cadet Program and learned to fly the B-17 "Flying Fortress", one of the United States' primary bombers of that era. He was assigned to the 96th Bomb Squadron stationed at Foggia Italy.

He completed 14 combat missions before being shot down over Vienna, Austria on July 16, 1944. He was severely wounded by shrapnel which broke both his legs and was then strafed by a 20mm cannon during his parachute descent. Jenkins was taken prisoner and spent the next 10 months in German captivity – six of them in Stalag 17. Here, the 20-year-old combat veteran became affectionately known by his prison mates as "Junior". Jenkins credits his youthful determination and the care of an Austrian nun, Sister Maria, with saving his life.

After being liberated by Russian forces, Larry was ultimately sent to Percy Jones Army Hospital in Battle Creek, Michigan, where he spent the next two years recovering from his wounds.

== Personal life ==
After the war, he attended Jackson College and Albion College before embarking on a 30-year career as electronics technician for RCA. He and his wife Peg raised three children, Larry, Jr., Roger and Connie.

Jenkins lived in Michigan, and was active as a volunteer at the Kalamazoo Air Zoo. His military awards and decorations include the Distinguished Flying Cross, the Air Medal (with 1 Oak Leaf Cluster), the Purple Heart, the POW Medal, the Army Good Conduct Medal, The American Campaign Medal, the ETO Campaign Medal (with one Battle Star), the World War II Victory Medal, and the British POW Medal.

== Death and legacy ==
His story and personal artifacts may be seen on a rotating basis at Michigan Heroes Museum. He died of pancreatic cancer on May 28, 2017, aged 93.

== Bibliography ==
- Layton, Andrew. Eagles' Wings: An Uncommon Story of World War II. Xulon Press, 2007 ISBN 978-1-60266-390-9
