= Edmund Plowden (colonial governor) =

American colonial governor (1590–1659)

Sir Edmund Plowden

Sir Edmund Plowden (1590 – July 1659 in Lydbury North, Shropshire, England) also titled Lord Earl Palatinate, Governor and Captain-General of the Province of New Albion in North America was an explorer and colonial governor who attempted to colonize North America in the mid-seventeenth century under a grant for a colony to be named New Albion. This attempt, fraught with mutiny, legal woes, lack of funds, and bad timing and compromised by Plowden's ill-temper, was a failure, and Plowden returned to England in 1649.

== Biography ==
The grandson of the jurist, Edmund Plowden (1515–1585), Sir Edmund Plowden was born in 1590 to Francis Plowden (1562–1652) of Shiplake Court in Oxfordshire and Wokefield Park in Berkshire and his wife, Mary Fermor. Plowden married Mabel Marriner (1596–1674) in 1609.
