= Francis Corbin =

Virginia planter and legislator (~1760–1821)

Member of the Virginia House of Delegates for Middlesex County, Virginia
- In office May 3, 1784 – November 9, 1795 Serving with William Curtis, Overton Corby, Ralph Wormeley, William Steptoe and Thomas Churchill
- Preceded by: Maurice Smith
- Succeeded by: Thomas Segar

Personal details
- Born: 1759 or 1760 Laneville plantation, King and Queen County, Colony of Virginia
- Died: May 23, 1821 Reeds plantation, Caroline County, Virginia
- Spouse: Ann Munford Beverley
- Children: 2 daughters and 6 sons including Robert B. Corbin, Thomas G. Corbin
- Parent(s): Richard Corbin, Betty Tayloe Corbin
- Education: in England
- Occupation: lawyer, planter, politician

Francis Corbin (1759/60 – May 23, 1821) was a Virginia lawyer, planter and politician, who represented Middlesex County in the Virginia House of Delegates and the Virginia Ratifying Convention and later moved to Caroline County.

== Early and family life ==
The youngest son of Richard Corbin and his wife Elizabeth (Betty) Tayloe, was born to the First Families of Virginia. Both his paternal and maternal ancestors had emigrated from England and become gentry in the Virginia colony (many serving in the House of Burgesses and some including his father since his childhood on the Governor's Advisory Council and others only holding local office) as they also operated plantations using enslaved labor. He received a private education appropriate to his class. In 1773 his family sent him to England to complete his studies, and he probably attended schools at Canterbury and Cambridge. He was admitted to study law at the Inner Temple on January 23, 1777, but found himself unable to return home during the American Revolution. He petitioned the King in 1779 for financial assistance because his Loyalist father could no longer do so.

== Career ==
After returning to Virginia in 1783, Corbin continued the families's planter and political traditions.

=== Planter ===
Thus, Corbin farmed using enslaved labor, although for much of his life he objected to slavery on moral and economic grounds, and expressed fear that the Union could rupture in the future over the issue. Thus in 1797 he wrote to James Madison that he was considering moving his family to Connecticut or Rhode Island because they did not allow slavery. Nonetheless, in the Virginia tax census of 1787, Corbin paid taxes on 11 enslaved adults and 12 teenage slaves, as well as four horses and 26 cattle in Middlesex County. He moved to Caroline County about 1795, and focused on managing "The Reeds", his plantation that by 1811 expanded to more than 3700 acres. In the 1810 census, Corbin paid taxes on 134 slaves in Caroline County. A decade later, Corbin owned 142 enslaved people. Corbin died the following year, and his estate included 70 slaves aged 12 or older.

=== Politician ===
Corbin's political career began in the spring of 1784, when Middlesex County voters elected him as one of their representatives in the Virginia House of Delegates in 1784, and he won re-election annually for a decade, as well as served as one of Middlesex County's delegates to the Virginia Ratifying Convention in 1788. Corbin served on the House of Delegates's Committee of Propositions and Grievances in several years, as well as several times on the Committees of Commerce (or of Trade), for Courts of Justice, for Religion (in 1786), Privileges and Elections, and of Claims.

In the October 1787 legislative session, Corbin proposed a state convention to consider ratifying the proposed federal constitution, and after becoming one of Middlesex County's delegates, he proved a strong supporter of that draft document (Federalist). On June 7, 1788, Corbin delivered a rebuttal to (anti-Federalist) Patrick Henry's objections to the new document, and on June 25 voted against requiring prior amendments before approval. He was also named to the five member committee to prepare a form of ratification, although he was in the minority in voting to prevent states from limiting the Congress's taxing power. Nonetheless, in 1791, Corbin worked to ensure the House of Delegate ratified the first ten amendments to the federal Constitution as suggested by anti-Federalist George Mason in that Convention, and later proposed by James Madison.

In January 1789, Corbin became a candidate for the new 7th congressional district, but lost to John Page (1743–1808). His campaigns for a congressional seat also failed in September 1790 and March 1793. Furthermore, although one of three candidates to replace Richard Henry Lee in the U.S. Senate, Corbin received only about 20% of fellow legislators' votes.

== Personal life ==
In December 1795 Corbin married Ann Munford Beverley, daughter of Essex county planter (and single term delegate) Robert Beverley (1740–1800). They had two daughters and seven sons, including:

- Robert Beverley Corbin (c. 1797 – 1868), inherited the Reeds plantation and would become the last of the paternal line to sit in the Virginia General Assembly, in his case representing Caroline County in the Virginia House of Delegates as well as serving as colonel of the county militia.
- Francis Porteus Corbin (1801–1876) married a Philadelphia heiress and died in Paris, France, although their son (this man's grandson), Richard Washington Corbin after education in England, returned to Virginia to serve on the staff of CSA General Fields. John Sawbridge Corbin (d. 1883) married Mary Blackwell and lived at "The Glimpse" in Hanover County.
- Anna Page Corbin (1803–1885) married Benjamin Franklin Randolph (1803–1889) of Culpepper, Virginia.
- Jane Virginia Corbin (1815–1904), and brothers William Lygon Corbin (d. 1883) and Washington Shirley Corbin (d. 1877) likewise never married.

== Death and legacy ==
Corbin suffered health problems for many years, including gout. He died suddenly at his Caroline County plantation on May 23, 1821, and was probably buried there. While most of his children continued to own slaves and operate plantations, his youngest son, Thomas G. Corbin began a naval career that included interdicting slave ships as well as fought with distinction for the Union during the American Civil War. Notwithstanding, CSA General Stonewall Jackson and the 2nd Corps of the Army of Northern Virginia, at the invitation of his grandson James Parke Corbin, overwintered during 1862–1863 on the grounds of Moss Neck Manor, thus now listed on the National Register of Historic Places.
