= Richard Corbin =

Virginian planter and politician

Member of the Virginia Governor's Council
- In office 1750–1776

Member of the House of Burgesses for Middlesex County, Virginia
- In office 1748–1750 Serving with Ralph Wormeley
- Preceded by: Philip Grymes
- Succeeded by: Christopher Robinson

Personal details
- Born: 1713 or 1714 Laneville plantation, King and Queen County, Colony of Virginia
- Died: May 20, 1790 Laneville plantation, King and Queen County, Virginia
- Resting place: Christ Church cemetery, Middlesex County, Virginia
- Spouse: Elizabeth (Betty) Tayloe
- Children: John Tayloe Corbin, Gawin Corbin, Jr., Francis Corbin (sons);
- Parent(s): Gawin Corbin, Jane Lane
- Education: in England
- Alma mater: College of William and Mary
- Occupation: planter, politician

Richard Corbin (1713 or 1714 – May 20, 1790) was a Virginia planter and politician who represented Middlesex County in the House of Burgesses and the Virginia Governor's Council. Although a noted Loyalist during the American Revolutionary War (during which two brothers served in British forces), he considered himself a Virginian and two of his descendants of the same name also served in the Virginia General Assembly following the conflict.

== Early life and education ==
The son of powerful planter Gawin Corbin and his second wife, Jane Lane, Corbin received an education appropriate to his class from private tutors at home, then the College of William and Mary in Williamsburg, and probably finished his education in England.

His father married three times, and his first and third wives were daughters of members of the Governor's Council. However, his well-connected first wife, Cathereine Wormeley, bore no children before her death. This man was one of the two sons borne of Gawin Corbin's second marriage. His mother, the former Jane Lane Wilson, was the daughter of Captain John Lane of York County and widow of Willis Wilson, and this man would rename his main plantation "Laneville" to honor her. His full brother John Corbin (1715-1757) would inherit the Portobago plantation and lands in several counties, but held only local offices. Jane Lane also bore three daughters, of whom the eldest, Ann, would survive her first husband, Isaac Allerton, and remarried Rev. David Currie of Christ Church Parish in Lancaster County, Virginia. Her sisters Alice and Felicia never married. His half brother (son by his father's third wife, Martha the daughter of Col. William Bassett) Gavin (d. 1760) also may have served as a burgess or this man's ward before his marriage and siring a daughter who inherited some of his property. The younger Gawin's widow Hannah Lee Corbin refused to formally marry her paramour, lest she lose her right to manage half of her husband's lands during her lifetime, after which this man inherited them. Richard Corbin also had two sisters or half-sisters who married burgesses, but who did not bear children who survived. Jennie Corbin married John Bushrod of Westmoreland County and Alice Corbin married Benjamin Needler, Clerk of the Governor's Council.

== Career ==
=== Planter ===
Corbin inherited substantial acreage from his father and from his elder brother, who died without children, including the plantations known as "Buckingham House" and "Corbin Hall" in Middlesex County, and "Laneville" in King and Queen County. In the Virginia tax census of 1787, he owned 37 enslaved adults and 82 teenaged slaves, as well as nine horses and 138 cattle in Middlesex County. He also administered an additional 48 adult slaves and 61 teenaged slaves, twelve horses and 102 cattle from the estate of Gawin Corbin, in Middlesex County alone.

=== Politician ===
Corbin first won election to the House of Burgesses representing Middlesex County after his father's death. However, his time in the lower house of the Virginia General Assembly proved short. He was nominated for a seat on the Governor's Council, on which he served until the dissolution of the body at the start of the American Revolutionary War. He also served as the county lieutenant of Essex County beginning in 1752.

As the Crown's receiver general from 1754-1776, he was responsible for financing Virginia's troops in the French and Indian War, and became a mentor of young George Washington. Decades later, after Lord Dunmore seized the colony's gunpowder at Williamsburg, Patrick Henry traveled to Corbin's main plantation (Laneville) to demand payment.

== Personal life ==
In July 1737 he married Elizabeth Tayloe (1719-1784), daughter of burgess and planter John Tayloe I of Mount Airy Plantation in Richmond County, Virginia. they had four sons who reached adulthood: Gawin (1740-1779), John Tayloe Corbin (1745-1794), Richard Corbin Jr.(b. 1751), Thomas Corbin (b. 1755) and Francis Corbin (1759-1821). Their daughter Elizabeth married Carter Braxton who would sign the declaration of Independence, although her sisters Alicia and Letitia never married.

== Death and legacy ==
Corbin died at the Laneville plantation at which he was born, but was initially buried at the family's Buckingham plantation. The graves were later moved to Christ Episcopal Church in Middlesex County.

Virginia has erected a historical marker to commemorate Patrick Henry's journey to now-disappeared Laneville. The John D. Rockefeller Library of the Colonial Williamsburg Foundation his papers and those of his descendants.
