= Richard Lee II =

Virginia politician (1647–1715)

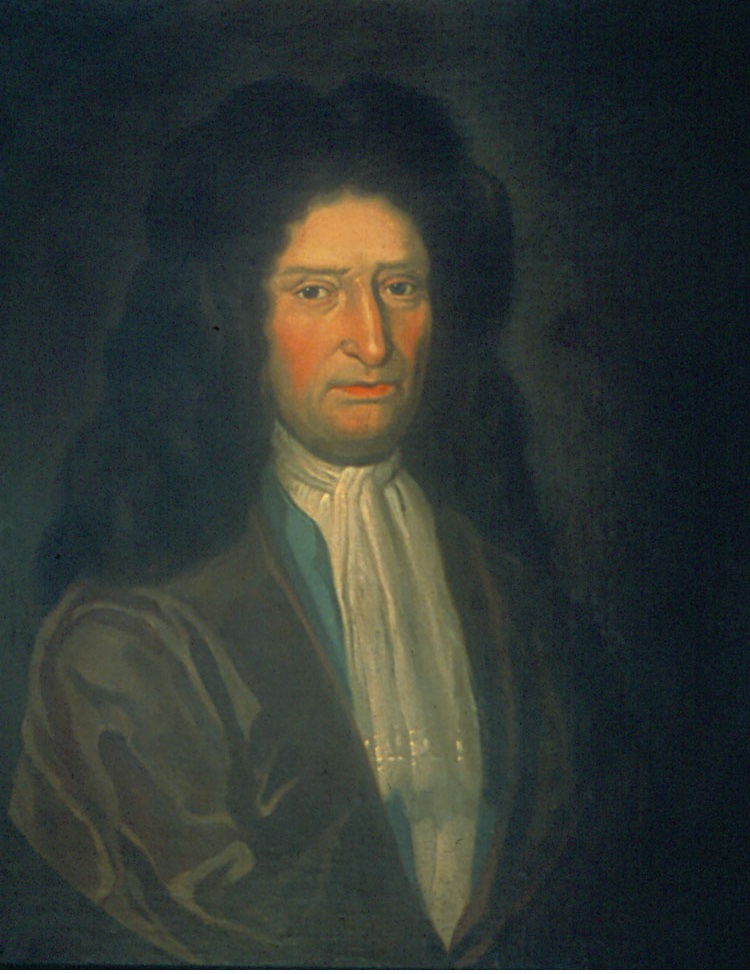
- Possible portrait of Lee

Member of the Virginia Governor's Council
- In office 1676–1698

Member of the Virginia House of Burgesses representing Westmoreland County
- In office 1670–1672 Serving with John Washington
- Preceded by: Nicholas Spencer
- Succeeded by: John Lee

Personal details
- Born: 1647
- Died: 1714 (aged 66–67)
- Spouse: Laetitia Corbin
- Children: 8, including Thomas and Henry
- Parent(s): Richard Lee I Anne Constable
- Occupation: Planter, officer, politician

Richard Lee II (1647–1714) was an American planter, politician and military officer from Northumberland County, Virginia who served in both houses of the Virginia General Assembly and was captured during Bacon's Rebellion.

== Early life ==
Born at "Paradise" plantation in Northumberland County, Virginia, to Anne Constable (ca. 1621–1666) and her merchant planter husband Col. Richard Lee I, "the Immigrant" (1618–1664), founder of the Lee Family of Virginia.

Lee is said by family tradition and some older historians to have been educated at Oxford in England and to have possibly studied law at the London Inns of Court but no proof of the claimed Oxford education have been found. He seemed destined for a career in the church, but he elected rather to return to the life of a Virginia gentleman, residing at "Paradise". In 1673, when his older brother John died unmarried, Richard inherited what had been his father's main estate, "Machodoc", and his two younger sons Thomas and Henry (who under primogeniture would receive little after his death, inherited specific property (some in Dorchester County, Maryland) under the terms of Richard's will. Richard left "Paradise" to overseers and moved to his new estate.

== Career ==
Upon his father's death, and later his brother John's death, he inherited considerable acreage in multiple Virginia counties. The Paradise plantation consisted of 1,350 acres (5.5 km^{2}), and was later part of Gloucester County.

Soon after his marriage, Richard won election to the House of Burgesses, and won re-election once. In 1676, Richard became a member of the legislature's upper house, the King's Council and he served in this capacity off and on until 1698. The Council also served as the Governor's privy council and the colony's Supreme Court. On one such absence in 1690, he had lost his seat because of his refusal to take the oath of allegiance to William III, King of England ("William of Orange") (1650–1702). However, he was reinstated within a year. Richard ultimately retired from that position because of ill health.

As early as 1680 he had accepted appointment as militia colonel for Westmoreland and adjoining (but later subdivided) Northumberland and Stafford counties. A more lucrative appointment he received during the term of Gov. Edmund Andros (1637–1714) was that of "Naval Officer and Receiver of Virginia Dutys for the River Potomac", for which he received 10% of the export duties collected.

Richard established his residence at the "Machodoc" plantation, then on the Potomac River in Westmoreland county, near the modern town of Hague in Westmoreland County. Pursuant to primogeniture, the large brick house, largely enclosed by a brick wall, would be inherited by his son Richard Lee III (1679–1718) who resided in London with his family, and was a merchant in the tobacco trade. However, around the time of this man's death, the mercantile firm of Corbin and Lee faced significant financial problems. Nonetheless, Richard III leased his estate in Virginia to his youngest, brothers, Thomas, Hon. (1690–1750) and Henry (1691–1747), for "an annual rent of one peppercorn only, payable on Christmas Day".

== Death ==
Richard survived his wife Laetitia by almost eight years, dying March 12, 1714, at "Machodoc" in Westmoreland County. His will was probated on April 27, 1715. He was buried alongside his wife Laetitia at what slightly more than a decade later became known as the old "Burnt House Fields", the family graveyard located near "Mount Pleasant".

== Personal life ==
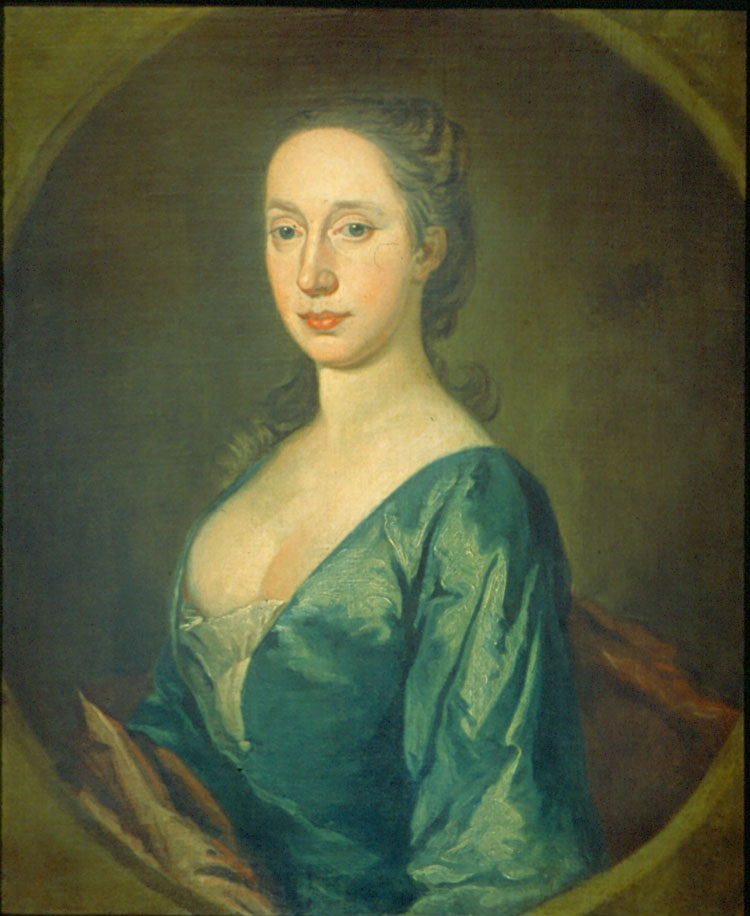
Laetitia Corbin Lee

Richard II, had one of the largest libraries in the Colony. He spent almost his whole life in study, and usually wrote his notes in Greek, Hebrew, or Latin. It was because of this that he was termed "Richard the scholar". Richard was a supporter of the Established Church. Richard married Laetitia Corbin (ca. 1657–1706), daughter of Richard's neighbor and member of the Governor's Council, Henry Corbin, Sr. (1629–1676) and his wife Alice (Eltonhead) Burnham (ca. 1627–1684). Laetitia's sister was Anne Corbin Tayloe.

1. John Lee (21 May 1678 – 1679), who died in infancy.
2. Richard Lee III (12 Jul. 1679–31 Dec. 1718), who married Martha Silk (23 Jan. 1679 – 23 Jan. 1734).
3. Capt. and Justice of the Peace Philip Lee (1681–1744) who married 1) Sarah Brooke (1683–1724), the daughter of Col. & Judge Thomas Brooke, Jr. (1660–1730), and 2) Barbara Dent (1676–1754), widow of her uncle, Col. & Gent William Dent Sr. (1660–1705).
4. Ann Lee (1683–1732), who married 1) Hon. William Fitzhugh, Jr. (1679–1713) of "Eagle's Nest" in King George County and 2) Capt. Daniel McCarthy, Sr., Esq. (1679–1724), son of Dennis (MacCartee) McCarthy, Sr. (d. 1694) and Elizabeth Billington.
5. Francis Lee (1685 – after 1754), who married Mary Barnell (born 1687; death date unknown).
6. Thomas Lee (Virginia colonist) (1690–1750) who built now-historic Stratford Hall in Westmoreland County. Thomas married Hannah Harrison Ludwell (1701–1750), daughter of Col. Philip Ludwell II (1672–1726) of Green Spring Plantation, and Hannah Harrison (1679–1731).
7. Henry Lee I (1691–1747) of "Lee Hall" in Westmoreland County. Henry married Mary Bland (1704–1764), daughter of Hon. Richard Bland, Sr. (1665–1720) and his second wife, Elizabeth Randolph (d. 1719).
8. Arthur Lee (1693–1756), who married an unknown Sherrad.
