= Laetitia Corbin Lee =

American colonist (1657–1706)

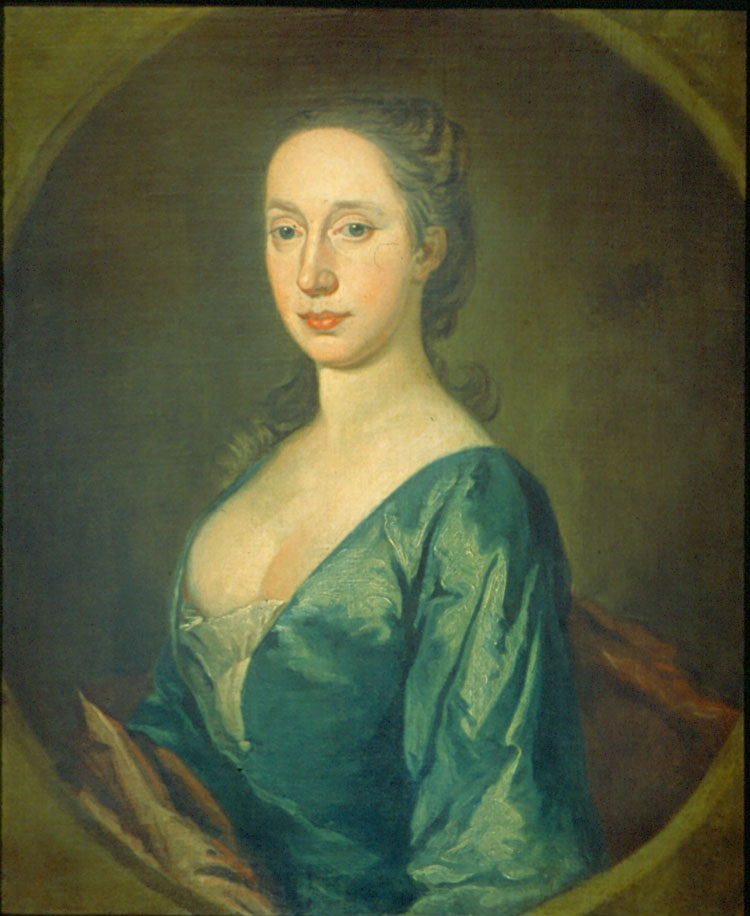
- Born: Laetitia Corbin; August 25, 1657
- Died: October 6, 1706 (aged 49); Machodoc, Colony of Virginia
- Resting place: Mount Pleasant in Westmoreland, Virginia
- Spouse: Richard Lee II
- Children: 8, including Thomas, Philip, and Henry
- Parent(s): Henry Corbin; Alice Eltonhead Burnham

Laetitia Corbin Lee (August 25, 1657 – October 6, 1706) was an American colonist. She was the daughter of Henry Corbin, one of the most powerful and influential political leaders in the Colony of Virginia. In 1674 she married the politician Richard Lee II, and joined the prominent Lee family of Virginia. The Maryland branch of the Lee family descends from her through her son, Philip Lee of Blenheim Plantation. Another of her sons, Thomas, built Stratford Hall, the future family seat of the Lees.

== Early life ==
Coat of arms of Henry Corbin

Born Laetitia Corbin on August 25, 1657, to Henry Corbin, an English-born Virginia merchant and planter, and his wife, Alice Eltonhead Burnham. She was one of eight children, and had relatives in many of what became the First Families of Virginia and Maryland. Through her father, she was a granddaughter of Sir Thomas Corbin and a great-granddaughter of Sir Gawen de Sutton Grosvenor. Her sister, Anne Corbin, married the planter William Tayloe. After her father's death in 1675, Lee's mother married Captain Henry Creyke.

== Career ==
In 1660, although she was an infant, her father deeded her 2,000 acres of land in what was then Stafford County, which later became Prince William County, Virginia. In 1674, having reached legal age for her gender, she married Richard Lee II, a military officer, planter, and member of the prominent Lee family of Virginia. The land that she brought to the marriage would become Leesylvania, the home of a branch of the Lee family for generations, and now a state park. Letitia bore eight children during the marriage, including Thomas, Philip, and Henry. A granddaughter, Laetitia, was named after her. Shortly after her marriage, Lee's husband was elected to the Virginia House of Burgesses and later served as a member of the Virginia Governor's Council.

She and her husband maintained one of the largest libraries in the Colony of Virginia at Machodoc, their plantation along the Potomac River in Westmoreland County, Virginia.

== Death and legacy ==
She died on October 6, 1706, at Machodoc and was buried at the Burnt House Cemetery near Mount Pleasant.
