= Jack Curtis (politician) =

American politician

Jack S. Curtis

Member of the Missouri Senate from the 30th district
- In office 1954–?

Personal details
- Born: March 25, 1912 Hartville, Missouri
- Died: April 20, 2002 (aged 90)
- Party: Republican
- Spouse: Helen Stamate
- Children: 1 daughter
- Education: Drury College; University of Missouri
- Occupation: Politician, city attorney, lawyer, Navy officer

Jack S. Curtis (March 25, 1912 – April 20, 2002) was an American politician from Springfield, Missouri, who served in the Missouri Senate. He served as city attorney for Springfield from 1941 until 1942. Curtis served as a lieutenant in the U.S. Navy Reserve from 1944 until 1946.
