= William Tayloe (the nephew) =

Member of the Virginia House of Burgesses representing Richmond County
- In office 1700-96 Serving with George Taylor
- Preceded by: William Colston
- Succeeded by: Samuel Travers
- In office 1695-96 Serving with Arthur Spicer
- Preceded by: position created
- Succeeded by: Samuel Travers

Personal details
- Born: 1645 Gloucestershire, Kingdom of England
- Died: 1710 (aged 64–65) Old House, Richmond County, Virginia
- Resting place: Old House, Richmond County, Virginia
- Occupation: Planter, Agent
- Known for: Virginia Planter, Progenitor of the Tayloe's of Mount Airy

Col. William Tayloe (1645–1710) was a well-connected British immigrant and progenitor of one of the First Families of Virginia, the Tayloes of Mount Airy.

== Early life ==
Tayloe immigrated with his brothers Joseph (founder of the North Carolina Tayloe's) and Robert who later returned to England. All were nephews of William Tayloe of Kings Creek Plantation and High Sheriff of York County. His coat of arms, Vert a sword erect Or between two lions rampant addorsed Ermine, matches those of "Teylow" in Gloucester, England discussed below.

After the death of his uncle, William Tayloe, this man inherited capital and property on the York and James Rivers, and began his career in local politics.

=== The Name Tayloe ===
The first record of the name Tayloe is from "The History and Antiquities of Gloucester: From the Earliest Period to the Present Time; Including an Account of the Abbey, Cathedral, and Other Religious Houses, with the Abbots, Bishops, and Dignitaries of Each, Voorkant, Thomas Rudge J. Wood, 1811. Where Thomas "Tayloe" or Teylowe is recorded as Sheriff of Gloucester under Mayor Philip Pridith during the final days of the 15th Century and again in the early 16th. A few years later he was Mayor in 1506, 1513 and, 1522.

=== Family origins ===
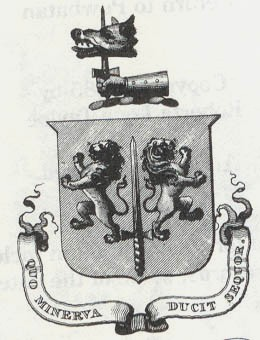
TEYLOWE/TAYLOE CREST

The earliest record of the name "Telowe" is from a document dated 1292 during the reign of Edward I regarding a Henry Telowe during an Inquisition of Henry De Dene (de Dene refers to Forest of Dean and later mentioned in de Dene's care is St Briavels Castle, it reads:

"Inquisition made on Monday next after the feast of St. Gregory the Pope, 20 Edw. I [1292] by Richard de Gorstleye, John Geffery, Henry son of Stephen, Henry Telow, Walter son of Nicholas, William de Crickesfend, John de Dene, Nicholas Scharlemayn, Robert son of Genry Glynt, Thomas and Hugh de Biddleslowe, of that land and tenements which Henry de Dene held of the King in chief on the day that he died.."

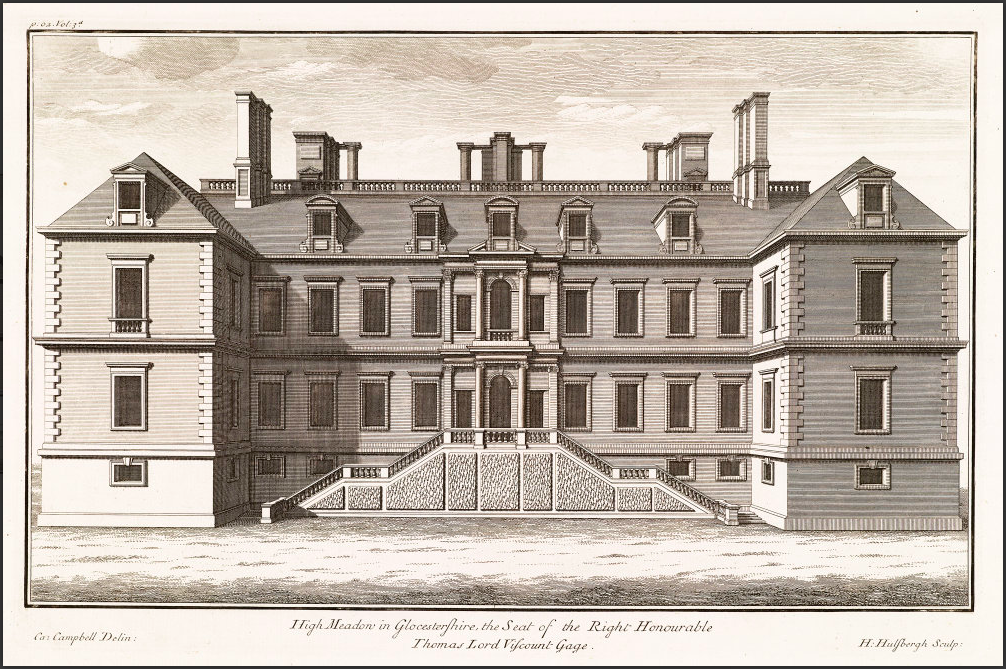
Heymedow/High Meadow, near Newland, Gloucestershire, UK. Garden front perspective

On 1 August 1420 for a Richard Teylowe, juror for the inquisition of "Joan, Widow of Roger Vynour." On 27 October 1442 a "John Teylowe: chaplain, querents" was party to land transaction in Hereford, England. In 1443 John Teylowe was a juror in the inquisition of Robert Whitney, Knight, dated 4 April. On 3 May 1452, Robert Hychys and his wife Alice release to Philip Teylowe, son of Alice, all of their rights to a piece of land in the parish of Newland near Lamscoy. In 1454-1455 a John Teylowe was an apprentice to Henry Frowyke. In 1466 Agnes Teylowe initiates a Quit-Claim of "Heymedow in Newland, late the relic of Philip Barbour, in pure widowhood, to James Hwett...within the parishes of Newlond and Stanton. This estate, later be known as "High Meadow," would be sold on 7 April 1516 by John Teylowe through a "Feoffment" to Henry Hall and then to Thomas Gage, 1st Viscount Gage through his marriage to heiress Benedicta Maria Theresa Hall.

There is record of a John Teylowe serving as Mayor in Hereford, England during the latter half of the reign of Edward IV circa 1471, again during the reign of Henry VII circa 1491, and again circa 1496.

== Career ==
In 1683 this man built "The Old House" on "Tayloe's Quarter" in the part of Old Rappahannock County that became Richmond County in his lifetime. A decade later, on November 23, 1693, this man, now with the military rank of "Colonel", sold and deeded the land he had inherited from his late uncle (1,200 acres between King's Creek and Queen's Creek on the York River, now known as Cheatham Annex) to Lewis Burwell II. Tayloe used the proceeds to by additional acreage from William Fauntroy land on the north side of the Rappahannock River."

In 1692 Richmond County was created from Old Rappahannock County, and Tayloe became one of the first burgesses to represent the county in that house (a part time position) as well as one of the first local justices of the peace (who collectively administered counties in that era). While other men were elected as burgesses until 1700, in that year, Richmond County voters elected Tayloe and George Taylor to replace William Colston and Thomas Lloyd, but they too failed to win re-election, with William Robinson and David Gwyn replacing them in the 1703-1705 session, although Tayloe was again elected in 1705 and in 1710 (but he died before beginning that final legislative term).

Meanwhile, in 1704, Tayloe became "Colonel and Commander in Chief" of the militia of the Richmond County militia, and subdued an attempted uprising of the Indians. On May 19, 1703, Colonel William Tayloe, Colonel George Taylor, Mr. Samuel Peachey, Captain John Deane, and Captain John Tarpley were justices of Richmond County.

On March 6, 1704/5, William Tayloe, Colonel and Commander-in-chief of Richmond County, on behalf of himself and the Militia within the county, "showeth several charges for services in August and September. Payments to Captain Thomas Beale, Captain John Crooke, Captain William Barber and Captain Henry Prereton their four companies on duty 33 days. Captain John Tarpley and Charles Barber sent out two squadrons of 12 men each under quartermasters. Also claim of William Underwood, Captain of a company of foot Oct 1704; Captain Alexander Donophan, Captain of troop of horse in the upper parts of Richmond County and Captain Nicholas Smith's claim for the troops under his command. In 1705 Col. William Tayloe, Lieutenant Colonel Samuel Peachey, Maj. William Robinson, Mr. Joshua Davis, Capt. Nicholas Smith, Mr. Edward Barrow and Mr. Francis Slaughter were justices, Richmond County. In 1706 Col. William Tayloe and Major William Robinson voted their burgesses expenses, each 9,980 pounds tobacco in Richmond County.

On February 7, 1710, at the time of his death, the court ordered the appraisement of his personal estate (valued at 702.8.8 pounds sterling). His son Colonel John Tayloe I, became administrator of the estate, as well as the principal heir.

== Personal life ==
He married Ann Corbin (1664–1694), daughter of Hon. Henry Corbin (ca. 1629–1676) and Alice (Eltonhead) Corbin, of "Buckingham House" Middlesex County, parents of Laetitia Corbin Lee, wife of Col. Richard Lee II, Esq. They had 4 children: Elizabeth, who died unmarried; Ann Catherine, who married Samuel Ball; John, who became the chief architect of the family fortune; and William, whose daughter married John Wormeley II.
