= Henry Corbin (colonist) =

Virginia Colony tobacco planter (1629–1675)

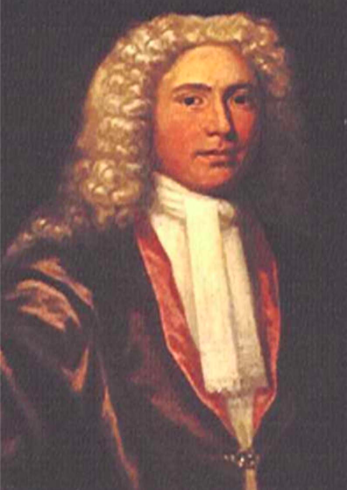
- Portrait of Hon Henry Corbin of Buckingham House, Middlesex, Virginia

Member of the House of Burgesses for Lancaster County
- In office 1659–1660 Serving with John Carter Sr., John Curtis
- Preceded by: Peter Montague
- Succeeded by: Raleigh Travers

Personal details
- Born: 1629 Hall End, Warwickshire, England
- Died: January 8, 1675 (aged 45–46) Buckingham House, Middlesex County, Virginia
- Resting place: Buckingham House, Middlesex County, Virginia
- Occupation: Planter, agent
- Known for: Virginia planter

Henry Corbin of Buckingham House (also Corbyn; 1629 – January 8, 1675) was an emigrant from England who became a tobacco planter in the Virginia Colony and served in both houses of the Virginia General Assembly, in the House of Burgesses representing Lancaster County before the creation of Middlesex County on Virginia's Middle Neck, then on the Governor's Council.

== Early life ==
Corbin was born in 1629 in Warwickshire, the third child of Sir Thomas Corbin (Hall End, Warwick, 24 May 1594 - Hall End, Warwick, June 1637) and his wife Winifred Grosvenor. He had four brothers and a sister (Letitia, after whom he would also name his daughter). The eldest brother, Thomas Corbin (b. 1624), married the daughter of Edmund Goodyear and their only child, Margaret, married William Lygon of Madresfield Court in Worcestershire, from whom the senior branch of the English Corbin family descends. Henry Corbin's other brothers were George, Gawin and Charles.

== Colonial merchant and planter ==
In 1654, at the age of 25, he immigrated across the Atlantic Ocean, arriving in the Virginia Colony aboard the ship Charity. Corbin remained active as a merchant after he settled on the Middle Neck . In his marriage contract with Alice Eltonhead Burnham, he gave a bond to secure her property and characterized himself as "of Rappahannock, Virginia, merchant." Corbin also operated tobacco plantations using enslaved labour. In 1660 he and his wife sold 300 acres on Morratico Creek to Raleigh Travers. In 1668, during the lengthy creation of Middlesex County from the part of Lancaster County south of the Rappahannock River, Corbin paid taxes for eighteen tithables, the most on that side.

== Officeholder and politician ==
The governor and council made Corbin a justice of the Lancaster County court in 1657. Lancaster County voters in both 1659 and 1660 elected Corbin as one of their representatives in the House of Burgesses, alongside the county's largest plantation owner, John Carter Sr., who lived and operated plantations on the Rappahannock's northern shore (with 58 tithables in 1668).

In 1661, Corbin mediated a dispute between the Potomac native people and Major General Hammand. He often appears in the court records of both Lancaster County, Westmoreland County and Northumberland County, often suing on creditors' behalf, often against decedents' estates. Some of his land would later be located in Richmond County, the Northern Neck of Virginia being split off from Northunberland County, and eventually Westmoreland, Lancaster and Richmond Counties being created therein

In 1663, Corbin was appointed to the Virginia Governor's Council. He remained on the council until his death in 1676.

== Family ==
Coat of arms of Henry Corbin

Some time before April 5, 1658, Corbin married Alice (Eltonhead), the widow of sometime burgess Rowland Burnham, whose brother was on the Maryland Governor's Council and whose several sisters married men on the Maryland and Virginia Governor' Councils, and daughter of Richard Eltonhead and wife Anne Sutton. During the marriage, she bore three sons (Henry, Thomas and Gawin), and five daughters (Laetitia, Alice, Winifred, Ann and Frances) who all married into the gentry. Gawin Corbin, like his father, would serve in the House of Burgesses, but represented Middlesex County. His youngest sister (this man's daughter) Frances (1666–1713) married Edmund Jenings (1659–1727) son of British barrister Sir Edmund Jennings (1626–1691) and Margaret Barkham (1626–1726), and who would become agent for the Northern Neck Proprietary for several years with Thomas Lee (whose brother Richard Lee II married her eldest sister, Letitia). However, the widower Jenings would die in disgrace and his property was foreclosed by powerful planter and burgess King Carter (with whom this man served) and by her brother Thomas Corbin. Colonel Lee, like Edmund Jenings, was a military leader, planter, politician, and member of the King's Council of Virginia. This man's sister Ann married William Tayloe, the nephew of William Tayloe (the immigrant) of King's Creek Plantation and High Sheriff of York County, Virginia, and bore John Tayloe I and progenitor of the Tayloe's of Mount Airy, Richmond County, Virginia. This man's sister Winifred (1661–1709) married Col. Leroy Griffin (1646–1702) and their son Thomas Griffin (1684–1732) would serve in the House of Burgesses representing Richmond County during the same 1715 session as his uncle Gawin, and their great-grandson Cyrus Griffin would become the final President of the Continental Congress of the Confederation and the first United States District judge of the United States District Court for the District of Virginia. Sister Ann Corbin (1664–1694) married merchant Philip Lightfoot of Charles City County, and their son Philip Lightfoot increased the family fortune as well as held government offices, most importantly on the Virginia Governor's Council.

== Death and legacy ==
Henry Corbin died in Virginia on January 8, 1675. By 1677, his widow married (3rd) Capt. Henry Creyke (or Creeke). In that year, his executores made a claim against Robert Beckingham's estate. His grand son is Philip Lightfoot II.
