= William Tayloe (planter) =

- Born: 1599; Gloucestershire, England
- Died: 1655 (aged 55–56); Kings Creek, York County, Virginia
- Other names: Teylow, Telowe
- Occupations: Planter, agent
- Known for: Virginia Planter, Uncle of the Progenitor of the Tayloes of Mount Airy

Col. William Tayloe (born 1599; also known as William Teylow) of King’s Creek Plantation, York County, Colony of Virginia, was an English-American immigrant, colonist and planter, from Gloucester, England, who emigrated to the British Colony of Virginia and resided in York County. His coat of arms, Vert a sword erect Or between two lions rampant addorsed Ermine, matches those of the Teylow families in Gloucester, England.

== Family History ==
Coat of Arms of William Tayloe

The earliest record of the surname "Telowe" is from a document dated 1292 during the reign of Edward I, regarding a Henry Telowe during an Inquisition of Henry de Dene. De Dene refers to The Forest of Dean and later mentioned in de Dene's care is St Briavels Castle, it reads:

"Inquisition made on Monday next after the feast of St. Gregory the Pope, 20 Edw. I [1292] by Richard de Gorstleye, John Geffery, Henry son of Stephen, Henry Telow, Walter son of Nicholas, William de Crickesfend, John de Dene, Nicholas Scharlemayn, Robert son of Genry Glynt, Thomas and Hugh de Biddleslowe, of that land and tenements which Henry de Dene held of the King in chief on the day that he died.."

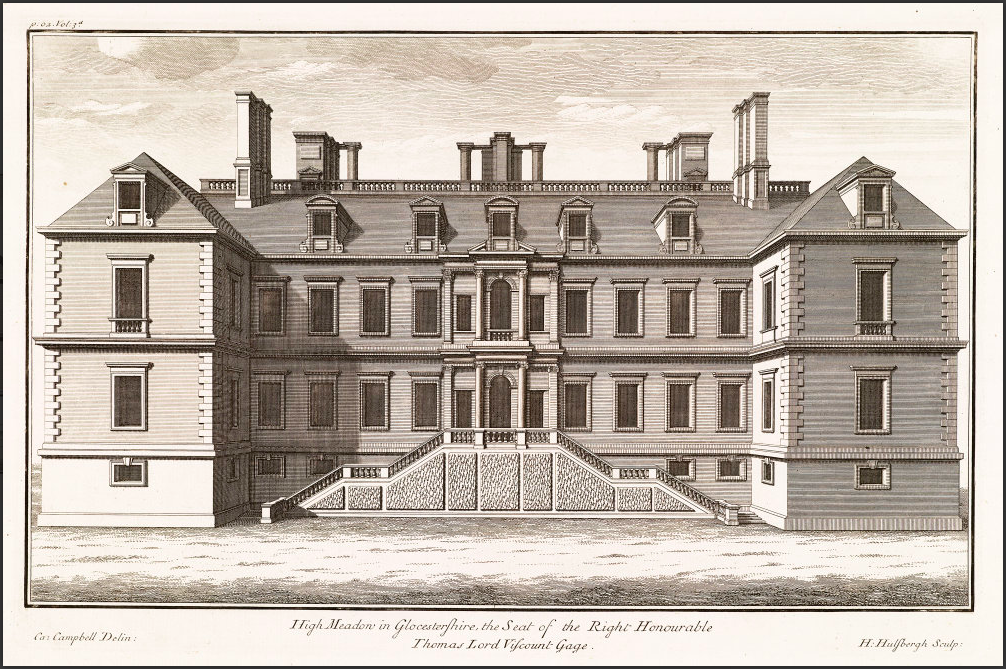
Heymedow/High Meadow, near Newland, Gloucestershire, UK. Garden front perspective

The earliest record of the name "Teylowe" is from a document dated 1 August 1420 for a Richard Teylowe, juror for the inquisition of "Joan, Widow of Roger Vynour". On 27 October 1442 a "John Teylowe: chaplain, querents" was party to land transaction in Hereford, England. In 1443 John Teylowe was a juror in the inquisition of Robert Whitney, Knight, dated 4 April. On 3 May 1452, Robert Hychys and his wife Alice release to Philip Teylowe, son of Alice, all of their rights to a piece of land in the parish of Newland near Lamscoy. In 1454–1455 a John Teylowe was an apprentice to Henry Frowyke. In 1466 Agnes Teylowe initiates a Quit-Claim of "Heymedow in Newland, late the relic of Philip Barbour, in pure widowhood, to James Hwett...within the parishes of Newlond and Stanton. This estate, later be known as "High Meadow," would be sold on 7 April 1516 by John Teylowe through a "Feoffment" to Henry Hall and then to Thomas Gage, 1st Viscount Gage through his marriage to heiress Benedicta Maria Theresa Hall.

There is record of a John Teylowe serving as Mayor in Hereford, England during the latter half of the reign of Edward IV circa 1471, again during the reign of Henry VII circa 1491, and again circa 1496.

== The Name Tayloe ==
The first record of the name Tayloe is from "The History and Antiquities of Gloucester: From the Earliest Period to the Present Time; Including an Account of the Abbey, Cathedral, and Other Religious Houses, with the Abbots, Bishops, and Dignitaries of Each, Voorkant, Thomas Rudge J. Wood, 1811. Where Thomas "Tayloe" or Teylowe is recorded as Sheriff of Gloucester under Mayor Philip Pridith during the final days of the 15th Century and again in the early 1500s. A few years later he was Mayor in 1506, 1513 and, 1522.

== Career ==
Tayloe was an early settler of York County, Virginia. On 10 February 1638, his land was mentioned as adjoining a patent to George Lobb, Thomas Pierce and Thomas Warner on the Chickahominy River in James City County, Virginia. This means that Tayloe had arrived in the colony earlier than February 1638.

On 9 November 1638, Taylor patented 1,200 acres on the Chichahominy River in James City County, Virginia, "beginning at the next point of land above Warrany Landing Place, W S[outh]ly upon the said river, E Nly into the main woods and Warrany Creek on the north, for the transportation of 24 persons.

In or before 1640, he purchased from John Utie the estate called "Utiemaria" in James City County, but did not own it for very long. By a deed dated 25 December 1640, "William Tayloe of Utiemaria in the County of Charles River, in Virginia, merchant," sold to William Blackley, 100 acres of land which he had bought from John Utie, and on 7 January 1641, he sold the land to Henry Corbell 1250 acres also purchased from Utie.

In April 1642, William Taylor and Elizabeth Kingsmill "now the wife of William Taylor" granted a patent to John Jackson. Elizabeth had obtained the patent on 26 September 1638, with John Jackson for 600 acres in James City County "being a small parcel of islands up Chickahominy River [en]compassed round with a marsh, ... due by right of transportation of 12 persons." Tayloe served as a burgess for York County in March 1642–43 and November 1647.

As Major William Tayloe, he was present as a member of the council, 6 November 1651, but lost his seat on the surrender of Virginia to the parliament. He was, however, again elected a councilor on 30 April 1652, and once more on 31 March 1654–55. He served as a justice of York County since 1647.

== Marriage ==
William Tayloe married Elizabeth Kingsmill (daughter of Richard Kingsmill, a prominent member of the Virginia Company and ancient planter), though they had no children. His widow married secondly wealthy planter Nathaniel Bacon (politician) (cousin of the future rebel Nathaniel Bacon), who had been a burgess for York County and also served as a member of the Governor's council and acting governor. Elizabeth's tomb, now in St. Paul's Churchyard, Norfolk, bears the Kingsmill and Tayloe arms.

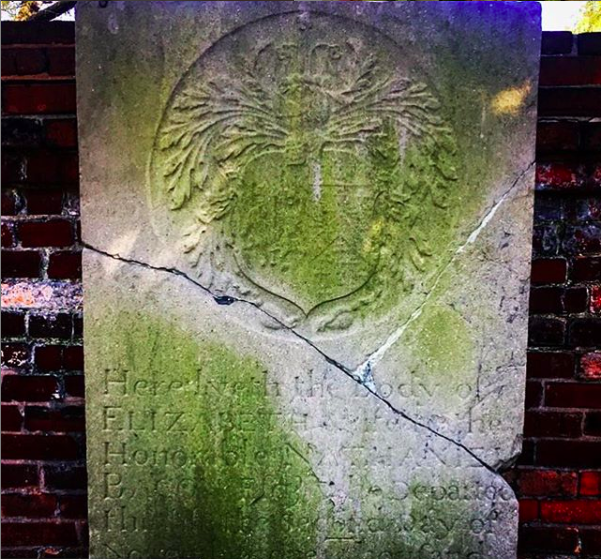
Headstone of Elizabeth Kingsmill

Through his also-immigrant nephew and heir, Colonel William Tayloe, of Richmond County—progenitor of the Tayloes of Mount Airy, Virginia—he is related to numerous representatives in Virginia.
