= New Albion (colony) =

17th-century English and Irish colony in eastern North America

New Albion was a short-lived 17th-century English and Irish colony in the area of modern-day New Jersey, Pennsylvania and Maryland in the United States.

Colonization was unsuccessfully attempted by Sir Edmund Plowden, under the authority of a charter granted by Charles I in 1634. The charter was formally through the Kingdom of Ireland, which was in personal union with, and dominated by, the Kingdom of England. In that sense, New Albion was an Irish colony.

Settlement was first attempted under the command of Plowden in 1642, but this ended in an attempted mutiny, after which Plowden managed New Albion from the Colony and Dominion of Virginia, selling rights to adventurers and speculators, until he returned to England in 1649. Despite further attempts to return to his colony, Plowden died a pauper. A large area of his claim was later given by the Duke of York to John Berkeley, 1st Baron Berkeley of Stratton and Sir George Carteret, and became the Province of New Jersey.

Governor John Winthrop wrote in his journal that Sir Edmund Plowden returned "to England for supply, intending to return and plant Delaware, if he could get sufficient strength to dispossess the Swedes." Soon after Plowden reached England there was published "A Description of the Providence of New Albion."

The Dutch Commissioners in 1659 visited Secretary Philip Calvert in Maryland and argued that Lord Baltimore had no more right to the Delaware River than "Sir Edmund Ploythen, in former time would make us believe he hath unto". Calvert replied "that Ployten has no commission, and lay in jail in England on account of his debts; that he had solicited a patent for Novum Albium [New Albion] from the King, but it was refused him, and he thereupon applied to the Vice Roy of Ireland, from whom he had obtained a patent, but that it was of no value."

== 1651 Map of Virginia showing New Albion ==
Ferrar 1650 Mapp of Virginia with New Albion marked

"A mapp of Virginia discouered to ye hills" by John Farrar was published in 1651. Upon this map, New Albion is identified and a note appears along the Delaware River, which states "This river Lord Plowden hath a patton of, and calls it New Albion, but the Swedes are planted on it and have a great trade in furrs."

== New Albion Settlers/Agents Named in Will of Sir Edmund Plowden ==
The will of Sir Edmund Plowden was recorded in England and includes a listing of agents that had contracted to settle ranging from 40 to 100 men each. The will was dated 29 July 1655 and identifies Mr. Plowden as "I Sir Edmund Plowden of Wansted, co. Southhampton, Knight, Lord Earle Palantine, Governor and Captaine Generall of the Province of New Albion in America, and peere of the Kingdome of Ireland". In addition to naming family members, the will states that "after my decease doe imploy by consent of Sir William Mason of Grays Inn Knt otherwise William Mason Esqire whom I make Trustee for this my plantation…for the planting, fortifying, peopling and stocking of my Province of New Albion, and to summon & enforce according to Covenants in Indentures and subscriptions all my undertakers to transplant thither & there to settle their number of men with such of my estate yearly can transplant, namely:

- Lord Mason, 50
- Lord Sherrard [descendant of Sir William Sherard, Kt. of Stapleford Park, Leicestershire, England], 100
- Sir Thomas Danby [Sir Thomas Danby, Kt. of Thorpe Perrow, Yorkshire, England], 100
- Captain Batts his heire [Capt. John Batte of Oakwell Hall, Birstall, Yorkshire, England], 100
- Mr. Eltonhead, a master in Chancery [Edward Eltonhead, Master in the High Court of Chancery], 50
- his eldest brother Eltonhead [William Eltonhead], 50
- Mr. Bowles late Clerk of the Crowne, 40
- Captaine Cleybourne in Virginia William Claiborne, 50
- Viscount Muskery, 50

& many others in England Virginia & New England subscribed & by direction in my manuscript bookes since I resided six [years?] there". The will was proved 27 July 1659, in the P.C.C.

=== Agents - John Batte, Thomas Danby and William Claiborne ===
On June 11, 1650 in England, granted "a pass for Mr. Batt [Capt. John Batte] and Mr. Danby [Sir Thomas Danby], for themselves and seven score men, women, and children, to go to New Albion." Edmund Plowden granted to Sir Thomas Danby a lease of ten thousand acres, one hundred of which were "on the northeast end or cape of Long Island," and the rest in the vicinity of Watsessett, presumed to be near the present Salem, New Jersey, with "full liberty and jurisdiction of a court baron and court leet," and other privileges for a 'Town and Manor of Danby Fort," conditioned on the settlement of one hundred "resident planters in the province," not suffering "any to live therein not believing or professing the three Christian creeds commonly called the Apostolical, Athanasian, and Nicene." The lease, 'The Lease from the Earl Palatine to Sir T. Danby' was described in the papers of Charles Varlo.

John Batte and Thomas Danby had entered into a "joynt adventure" with one another on January 6, 1649 (perhaps, 1650). On 21 September 1653, Phillip Mallory signed an affidavit that he had received what he could of the estate of John Batte, deceased, in the Colony of Virginia and “therefore to the utmost of my power discharge, release, acquit William Batte, son and heir of Gent. John Batte of all debts, dues, accounts or whatever that may be claimed by Sir Thomas Danby Kt.”

There is no record of John Batte receiving a patent in Maryland, Pennsylvania or New Jersey; however, two of his sons held a large grant for land in Virginia; on April 29, 1666, a grant for land in Charles City County, Virginia was issued to “Thomas Batts and Henry Batts sons of Mr. John Batts dec’d” for 5,878 acres, which land description references the James River in Appomatock, “the said land being due by and for the transportation of 118 persons into the Colony”. This land was later located in Prince George County, Virginia when it was formed in 1703.

Surviving papers of the Danby family reveal that in September 1650, John Batte purchased "Buckrow in the names of Christopher Danby & John Danby", sons of Sir Thomas Danby, "who were sent with John Batt into Virginia". Sir Thomas Danby had "sent over unto Virginia (under the conduct of one Captain Batt) his second & third sonns, Mr. Christopher & Mr. John Danby, with purpose to come over & settle there himself". There is no evidence that Thomas Danby ever traveled to America. The Buckrow parcel purchased by John Batte for the Danby children was located in Elizabeth City County, Virginia and was adjacent a 700-acre land grant of 24 November 1647 of William Claiborne. William Claiborne had established a trading post at Kent Island, Maryland in 1631. John Batte (Captain Batts, his heirs), Thomas Danby and William Claiborne are all mentioned in the will of Edmund Plowden as having contracted to settle men to New Albion.

The early records of Elizabeth City County, Virginia that would document the Buckrow purchase have been lost/destroyed; however, a lengthy suit of ejectment related to land title disputes refers to earlier records that provide context. Within the case is referenced "Defendant moved that a copy of a Deed produced by the Plt. made in behalf of Willm Batt of Barlsand in the County of York, Esq. &c., Martha Batt of Barkwell in the said County, Spinster, Sister of the said William Batt to Collo Chas. Moryson [Coll. Charles Morrison], might be read." Within the Danby family papers is found a letter dated May 1695 from Frances Culpepper (married 1st Samuel Stephens and 2nd William Berkeley), whose sister Anne Culpepper had married Christopher Danby. The letter records that Frances Berkeley is writing to Sir Abstrupus Danby "to you about a plantation of your Fathers called Buck row [Buckrow] which I am sure he never sold, but I have been informed since that Sir Thomas Danby impowr’d Mr. William Batt".

=== Agents - Lord Sherard ===
The British Archives list a 21 February 1637/8 grant from Sir Edmund Plowden to Sir William Sherrard, Kt. of Stapleford. The summary states the grant is to "agreed to settle one hundred men to be Resident Planters in the Province" for the granting of 10,000 acres near Delaware Bay and Mount Plowden. William Sherrard died circa 1640 and his wife Abigail died in 1657. Her will was written in 1655 and states she was the relict of Lord William Sherrard, baron of Leitrim, in the Kingdom of Ireland.

=== Agents - Edward and William Eltonhead ===
Around 1640 William Eltonhead (1616–1655) left Eltonhead Hall in Sutton for Maryland to take up the position of special envoy to Lord Baltimore. He was the proprietor of the Maryland colony whose interests William oversaw. Back home his brother Richard Eltonhead fought for the Earl of Derby and the monarch King Charles I in the first English civil war. As a consequence of supporting the defeated Royalist Cavaliers, Richard lost most of his wealth and was no longer able to afford dowries for his five young daughters. William Eltonhead was executed by firing squad after losing an encounter with the Puritans of Providence. However Edward Eltonhead had much better fortune in the New World and was granted 10,000 acres in Maryland for the act of providing fifty men for the province of New Albion. On 22 July 1653, William Eltonhead witnessed an indenture between Argoll Yeardley and Thomas Butteris.

== 18th-century claims ==
In the 1770s, a British farmer and trader named Charles Varley, with access to the royal courts at Dublin, somehow managed to buy an interest in the claims established by the old charter of Charles I (from more than 100 years before). He traveled to North America in 1784 with the rather quixotic intent to enforce his interest in these claims and run a colony of New Albion in the region that by this time had already long since been the Province of New Jersey and, moreover, had just become the State of New Jersey when the Treaty of Paris (1783) concluded the American Revolutionary War. Disabused of his notions of colonial lordship, Varley toured the agriculture of the mid-Atlantic states, dined with George Washington at Mount Vernon, and soon returned to the British Isles. During his lifetime he published various books on agricultural husbandry.

== See also ==
- English colonial empire
- New Albion (Sir Francis Drake's claim of 1579)
- British colonization of the Americas
- New Netherland
- New Sweden
- New England
- Colonial America
