= Gawin Corbin Sr. =

Virginia planter and politician)

Gawin Corbin

Member of the House of Burgesses for Middlesex County
- In office 1742–1747 Serving with Ralph Wormeley IV
- Preceded by: Edmund Berkeley
- Succeeded by: Philip Grymes

Personal details
- Born: 1725 Peckatone plantation, Westmoreland County, Colony of Virginia
- Died: 1760 (aged 34–35) Peckatone plantation, Westmoreland County, Colony of Virginia
- Spouse: Hannah Lee Corbin
- Relations: Gawin Corbin(father)
- Children: Martha
- Occupation: planter, politician

Gawin Corbin (1725-1760) was a Virginia planter and politician who served in the House of Burgesses representing Middlesex County, Virginia in the term in which his father of the same name died.

== Early and family life ==
Coat of arms of Henry Corbin

Born to the First Families of Virginia, his mother Martha Bassett being the daughter of one of the members of the Virginia Governor's Council and his father serving in the House of Burgesses for many terms in various counties in which he owned significant acreage. His mother was his father's third wife, and while the elder Gawin Corbin had no children before his first wife died, he had two sons and several daughters with his second wife, Jane Lane.

Since the boy was under legal age when his father drafted his will (although the elder Gawin Corbin would live until 1744), that will named his tutor as Mr. Christianall, and his guardians as his eldest brother Richard, as well as relatives William Bassett (his grandfather), Benjamin Needler (clerk of the council and husband of one of his aunts) and Robert Tucker (husband of another aunt). The father's will announced that young Gawin would receive the Peckatone plantation and lands in Westmoreland, Lancaster, King George, Prince William and Spotsylvania counties.

== Career ==
His father having died in 1744, this Gawin Corbin was one of the original investors in the first Ohio Company of Virginia, organized in 1748 by Thomas Lee, with his sons Philip Ludwell Lee and Thomas Ludwell Lee., as well as prominent planters John Tayloe, Lawrence and Augustine Washington, Robert Carter II and George Fairfax. Both Lyon Gardiner Tyler and the Corbin family biographer believe he succeeded his father in the House of Burgesses, although he did not receive land in either Middlesex nor King and Queen Counties. His elder half-brother Richard Corbin lived in and inherited lands in those counties and may have been grooming his younger half brother, and indeed succeeded to the Middlesex burgess position after the man who probably defeated this Gawin in the 1748 election, Philip Grymes, accepted a royal appointment disqualifying him from legislative duties. However, a recent expert on the Virginia General Assembly believed only the father won election to the House of Burgesses representing Middlesex County for the lengthy but intermittent session that began in 1742 and continued without further election until 1747 (three years after the father's death, without an interim election, as generally happened when a burgess died during a term).

== Personal life ==
This Gawin Corbin married Hannah Lee (1728-1782), daughter of Thomas Lee of Strathmore Hall in Westmoreland County. However, different abstracters give the marriage date as 1747 or before 1749. They had a daughter, Martha, who reached adulthood in 1769 and married George Turberville, his cousin through his mother Martha Lee Turberville.

== Death and legacy ==
This Gawin Corbin wrote a will on October 29, 1759 which was admitted to probate on July 29, 1760. Corbin reportedly died of injuries sustained in a horse riding accident. He is presumed buried at the Peckatone farm cemetery near Hague in Westmoreland County. The will gave his widow half his large estate (in various counties) with the proviso that she would have to surrender it all if she remarried or left Westmoreland County. The Peckatone house and other half of the estate went to Martha when she reached 21 years old or married, and provided that if she did not have children, it would go to the two youngest sons of his brother Richard Corbin and the other half to the sons of his sister who married Tucker. Martha's guardians until she came of age were named as her mother, and her uncles Col. Richard Henry Lee, Thomas Ludwell Lee, Francis Lightfoot Lee and Richard Corbin. Reputedly, Richard Henry Lee was exasperated by Hannah's refusal to settle this man's estate, insisting that all that was necessary was that she sell "one middling slave".

Until Martha married, the widow lived at Peckatone with Dr. Richard Lingan Hall, a widower who was the family physician for both the Lee and Corbin families as well as an early Baptist. The arrangement greatly displeased Hannah's youngest brother Arthur and presumably others in the family and/or community. In 1763 Hannah gave birth to a son, Elisha. The following year, the Westmoreland County Court charged both Dr. Hall and Hannah with failing to attend Anglican services. Soon, the Lee factor in England complained that Dr. Hall owed him money and had moved his account to William Molleson, who also served as Hannah Corbin's agent, and who was displeased with Hannah's slow payment practices.
