= Edward Thornton Tayloe =

American diplomat (1803-1876)

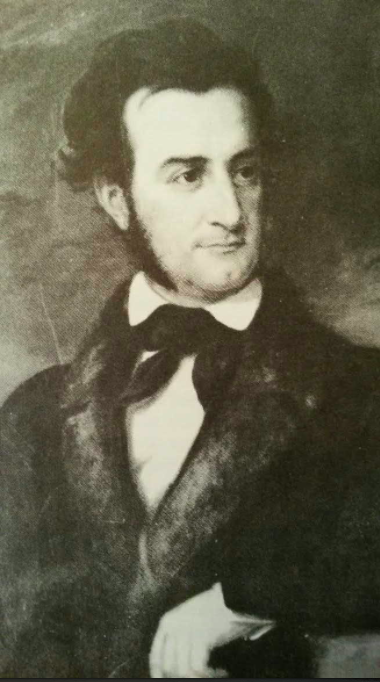
- Edward Thornton Tayloe
- Born: January 21, 1803; The Octagon House, Washington, DC
- Died: November 26, 1876 (aged 73); Powhatan Hill Plantation, King George County, Virginia
- Occupations: Diplomat, Planter

Edward "Thornton" Tayloe (January 21, 1803 – November 26, 1876) was an American diplomat, planter and scion of colonial tidewater gentry. He was named after his godfather, Edward Thornton a friend and fellow student of his father's at Eton College and His Majesty's ambassador to Washington D.C. He owned estates in King George County, Virginia and the Canebrake (region of Alabama). He was the private secretary to Joel Roberts Poinsett during his time as the first minister to Mexico. He married his first cousin, Mary Ogle, at Belair Mansion (Bowie, Maryland) Prince George's Co., Maryland during Christmas in 1830.

== Birth and Schooling ==
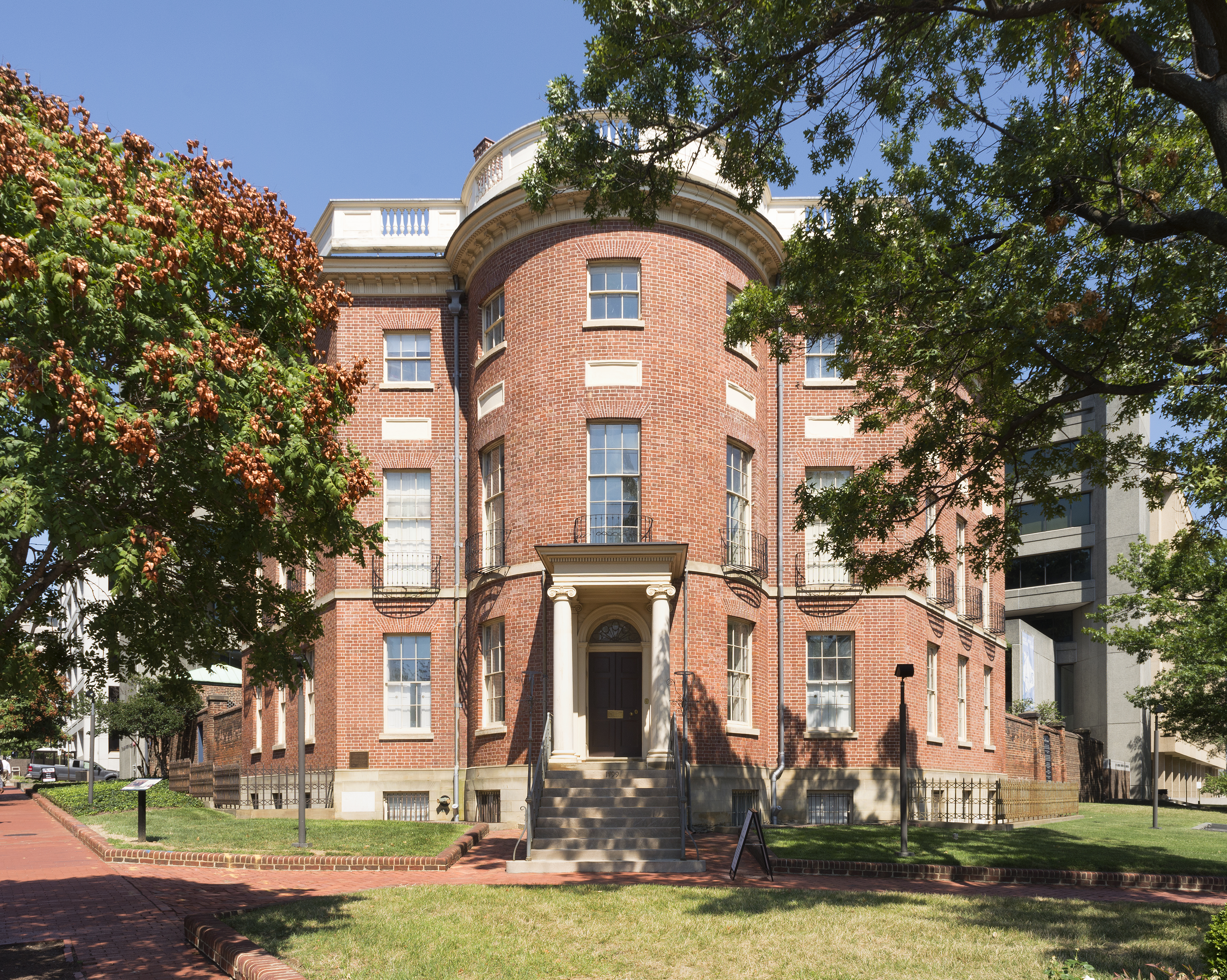
The Octagon House

Tayloe was born on January 21, 1803, at The Octagon House, the city residence built by his father John Tayloe III, who inherited the grand colonial estate Mount Airy, Richmond County, Virginia built by his father Colonel John Tayloe II, whom were respectively arguably each the wealthiest plantation owner in the country for their generations. His maternal grandfather was Benjamin Ogle, ninth governor of Maryland, and great-grandfather was former Provincial Governor, Samuel Ogle. In 1819 at age 16 he entered Harvard University. In 1821 he was expelled from Harvard, then readmitted. He was a member of the Porcellian Club.

In 1823 he graduated from Harvard.

== Career ==
From 1823 to 1825, he spent two years after graduation moving about in the society of the day and attending the races. After he left Harvard, he commenced a period of traveling. He visited all the famous homes and social spots of Virginia, including Monticello, "where he was favored with a gracious conversation by the aging Jefferson." Edward admired Jefferson. It was during this time that he met Mr. Joel Roberts Poinsett of South Carolina, the newly appointed Minister to Mexico. Mr. Poinsett wanted a private secretary, but it was not allowed in his budget, while John Tayloe III wanted an opportunity for his son. It was agreed that Edward would accompany Mr. Poinsett to Mexico without pay and at his own expense. He was skilled in French, Italian and Spanish. On Mar 30 1825 he set sail on the U.S.S. Constellation for Mexico.

In May 1830 he arrived in Mexico and spent 3 years there, during which time he kept a journal of his travels and observations. Upon returning home, he added to the journal with material taken from letters he had written to relatives from Mexico. The completed journal was sold to a manuscript dealer in the late 1940s and was purchased by the Library of Congress. It was published in 1959 by the University of NC Press as "Mexico 1825-1828 - The Journal and Correspondence of Edward Thornton Tayloe." The careful journal he kept of the 3 years with Poinsett reveals a young, ardent, inquiring and sometimes impatient mind, but also a patient and dispassionate precision and objectivity. He enjoyed drenching himself with Mexican culture and politics. Mr. Poinsett's attitude toward the Mexican government inspired the Mexicans to coin a word - poinsettismo - to summarize their displeasure at being pushed. America responded by coining a word of its own, poinsettia, to name the beautiful flowers the diplomatic mission brought back. Edward recorded the details of everyday life, the weather and the fruits of the land.

In 1828 his father died 3 weeks before Edward returned to Washington. Edward was at sea and knew nothing until he arrived. In addition to learning of his father's death, he was informed that he was co-executor of the will and the vast and complicated estate. Edward inherited about 2,000 acres his father had bought from James Keep in 1795, about 50 miles from Mount Airy on which he built "Powhatan Hill Plantation;" John Tayloe's will devised to Edward "all my plantations in King George County Virginia called the Hop Yard, including also the plantation which I have bought lately of Taliaferro called the Dogue, adjoining to the Hop Yard."

In 1828 he became Secretary of Legation to William Henry Harrison, this country's first minister to Colombia. Since 1825 he had flooded the fledgling Department of State with recommendations from influential friends, including Poinsett, seeking his appointment to diplomatic service. Only six weeks after his return from Mexico, he was appointed by President John Quincy Adams. Before the party left for Bogota, President Adams was defeated by Andrew Jackson, and the patrician Virginians and New Englanders who had ruled America since its creation were out. Gen. Harrison and Edward Tayloe proceeded to Colombia, hoping the new administration would leave them in place. While they awaited the ship, Gen. Cordoba seized the opportunity of Simon Bolivar's absence to stage a revolt in Colombia. Bolivar's second in command blamed the Cordoba affair on the meddling of Harrison and Tayloe. Then an American adventurer in the employ of Bolivar's government saw an opportunity for his own advancement and spread the tale that Harrison and Tayloe had conspired with Cordoba in his attempted coup. A mutual friend of Harrison and Tayloe was imprisoned without charges or trial, and they returned to Virginia. Simon Bolivar had disappointed him with his aggression against Peru and his dictatorial tendencies, and Washington politics had topped everything off.

In 1830 he became a County Magistrate, in that same year he wrote to Rensselaer Van Rensselaer, a companion from Bogota days, inviting him to the Tayloe plantation at "Powhatan Hill." In 1832 the plantation house was completed.

In 1836 he wrote to William Henry Harrison, he remarked concerning the Van Buren presidential campaign, "we can only counteract them by rallying under the banner of States' Rights. This must be our flag, and under that alone can we conquer the ground we have lost."

In 1840 he won election with William Henry Harrison, but President Harrison died. Before his death, President Harrison confided to Benjamin Ogle Tayloe that he intended naming Edward Tayloe to the post of Treasurer of the United States. One account even states that Mr. Harrison caught his death while walking in the rain from St. John's Church with that information.

In 1861 he and his sons pledged their lives and fortunes for the secessionists on behalf of a way of life they understood to be constitutionally sound and morally honorable. As far as these Virginians were concerned, the central issue was the right of its commonwealth to govern itself as it had from the beginning. As the war progresses, Edward found it necessary to load his family's necessities into wagons for a series of journeys, ever more southward. At each stage, he rented a house. Finally, he moved to "Buena Vista," near Roanoke, where his brother George Plater Tayloe lived in a fine home he had built a few years earlier. Though Edward was able to make several trips back to "Powhatan Hill" to check on crops tended by the slaves he left in charge, it was not enough. At the war's end, scarcely any of the furniture was left. On these returns, he also had to stop at the "Dogue," the landed estate given to his son Bladen Tasker Tayloe, to check on that farm. Throughout his years as a farmer, he kept a journal now given to the University of Virginia Archives. "Unlike his earlier, more literary journal on Mexico, this one is lean and spare, mostly a painstakingly accurate record of crops and rainfall. Its silence is eloquent as if mere words could no longer serve him as they did when he was young and ready to conquer the world of diplomacy... there is a constant attention to the details of the land: on a three hundred mile ride back to Powhatan Hill to check on the mother plantation and on the homes he'd given his sons, he could write, 'the dogwood is early this year and very beautiful,' and leave it at that."

A plaque in St. John's Episcopal Church at King George, which he helped build, recalls his "great worth" to the Church. He worked all his life on behalf of his community, his church, his family and his country, and he cultivated the southern virtue of hospitality toward all, rich and poor alike.

Edward Thornton Tayloe owned for more than 50 years the table that had been in the Octagon House and on which the Treaty of Ghent had been signed. Upon his death, it passed to Edward's son George Ogle Tayloe. On 17 Jun 1896, John Tayloe's sons George P. Tayloe and Henry A. Tayloe signed a certificate of authenticity drawn up by Edward H. Ingle, Edward T. Tayloe's son-in-law, stating that they were familiar with the table when it stood in the library in their father's house in Washington D.C., where it remained for many years after the Treaty had been signed on it. On 30 Oct 1897 Edward's son G. Ogle Tayloe sold the table to Annie Bailey Voorhies, who had family connections.

He came to own lands 5 miles northeast of Uniontown, Alabama in the year 1835.

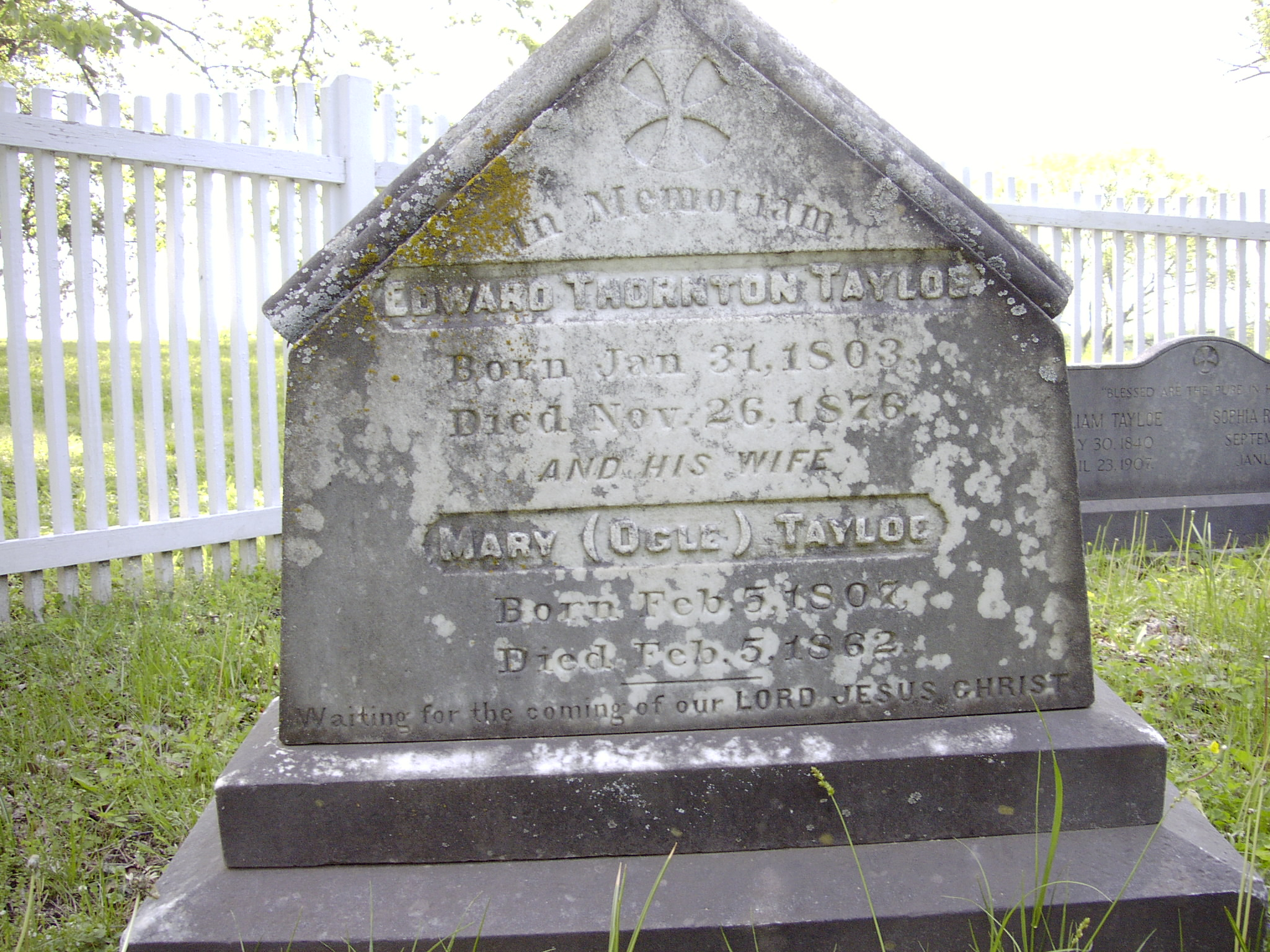
Edward Thornton Tayloe & Mary Ogle Tayloe Grave

== Ancestry ==
Ancestors of Edward Thornton Tayloe

16. William Tayloe (the nephew)
8. Col John Tayloe I
17. Ann Corbin
4. Col John Tayloe II
18. David Gwynn
9. Elizabeth Gwynn
19. Kathrine Griffin
2. Col John Tayloe III
20. George Plater I
10. George Plater II
21. Ann Rousby Burford
5. Rebecca Plater Tayloe
22. Colonel Thomas A. Addison, I
11. Rebecca Addison Bowles
23. Elizabeth Tasker
1. Edward Thornton Tayloe
24. Samuel Ogle
12. Samuel Ogle
25. Ursula Markham
6. Benjamin Ogle
26. Benjamin Tasker Sr.
13. Anne Tasker
27. Ann Bladen
3. Ann Ogle
28. Joseph Hill
14. Henry Hill
29. Sarah Richardson
7. Henrietta Margaret Hill
30. Philip Thomas
15. Mary Thomas
31. Ann Chew
