= John Tayloe =

John Tayloe may refer to:

- John Tayloe I (1688–1747), plantation owner and businessmen in Virginia
- John Tayloe II (1721–1779), plantation owner in Virginia
- John Tayloe III (1770–1828), Virginia, businessman

== See also ==
- John Tayloe Lomax (1781–1862), American jurist
