= Mount Airy Plantation =

Historic house in Virginia, United States

- Mount Airy
- U.S. National Register of Historic Places
- U.S. National Historic Landmark
- Virginia Landmarks Register
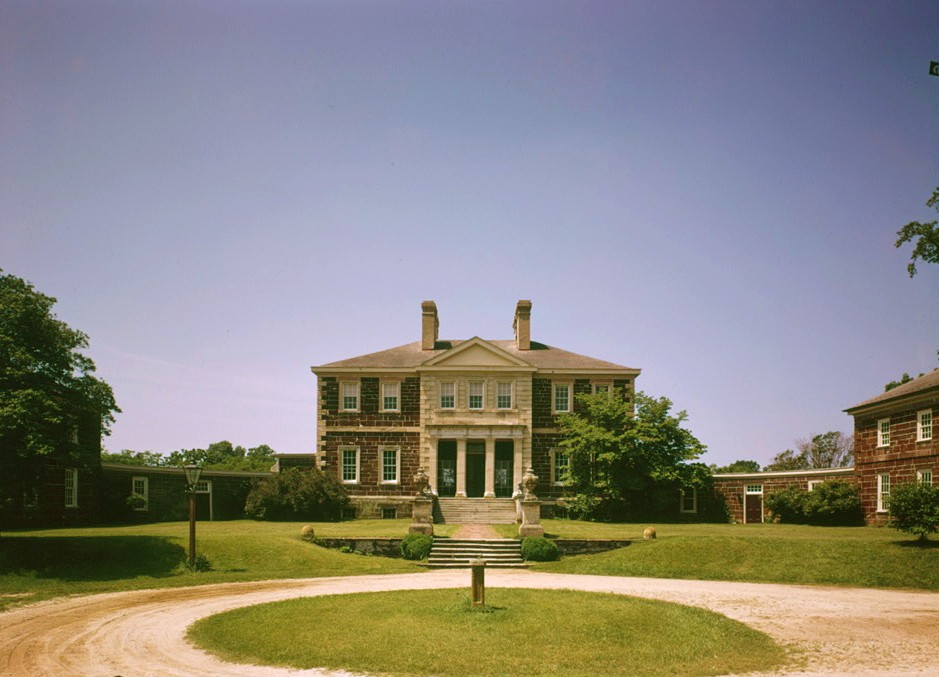
- Mount Airy in 1971
- Location: West of Warsaw on U.S. 360, Richmond County, Virginia
- Coordinates: 37°58′20″N 76°47′29″W
- Area: 450 acres (180 ha)
- Built: 1758–62
- Architect: William Buckland (architect)
- Architectural style: Neo-Palladian
- NRHP reference No.: 66000845
- VLR No.: 079-0013

Significant dates
- Added to NRHP: October 15, 1966
- Designated NHL: October 9, 1960
- Designated VLR: September 9, 1969

Mount Airy, near Warsaw in Richmond County, Virginia, is the first neo-Palladian villa mid-Georgian plantation house built in the United States. It was constructed in 1764 for Colonel John Tayloe II, perhaps the richest Virginia planter of his generation, upon the burning of his family's older house. John Ariss is the attributed designer while William Buckland (architect) was the builder/architect. Tayloe's daughter, Rebecca and her husband Francis Lightfoot Lee, one of the only pair of brothers to sign the Declaration of Independence (Richard Henry Lee being the other brother) are buried on the estate, as are many other Tayloes. Before the American Civil War, Mount Airy was a prominent racing horse stud farm, as well as the headquarters of about 10-12 separate but interdependent slave plantations along the Rappahannock River (comprising some 60,000 acres). Mount Airy is listed on the National Register of Historic Places as a National Historic Landmark as well as on the Virginia Landmarks Register and is still privately owned by Tayloe's descendants.

== Architecture ==
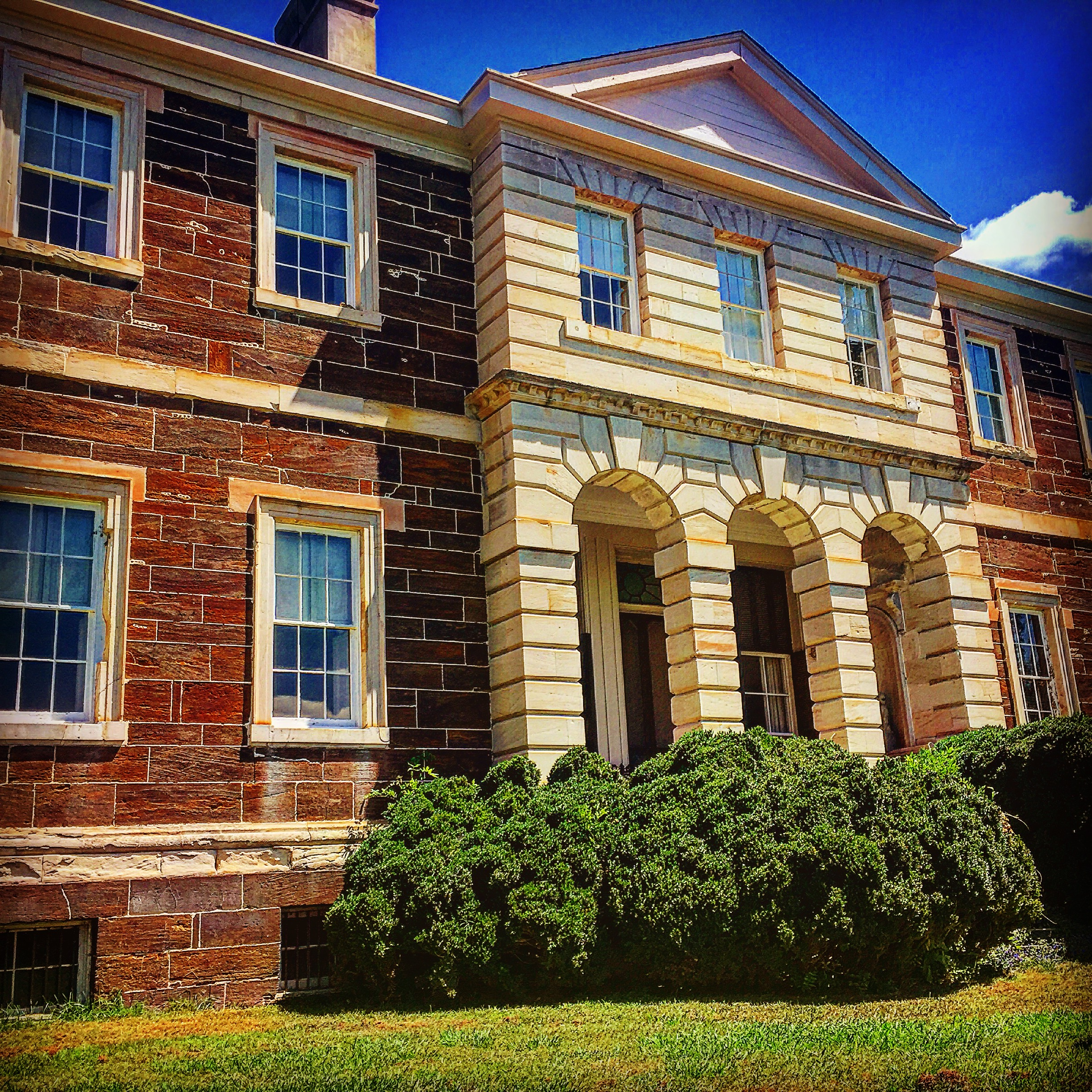
River Facade of Mount Airy, Richmond Co, Virginia

Mount Airy is composed of a massive two-story central block above a high basement, 69 feet (21 m) long and 47 feet (14 m) deep, two curving one-story passageways, and two 36-foot (11 m)-square two-story end dependencies set forward. The five-part unit, 128 feet (39 m) long, encloses three sides of a semi-circular forecourt. This court is raised by a low terrace above the entrance drive and is reached by cut and molded stone steps, flanked by elaborate carved stone vases on pedestals. Set on a ridge, the house commands a wide view of the Rappahannock River Valley. The 3-foot-thick (0.91 m) walls of the central unit are made of dark-brown sandstone, carefully hewn and laid in courses of random height, with architectural trim in light-colored limestone. It is possible that the exterior may originally have been stuccoed though no trace remains. The north or entrance façade is approached from the forecourt by a flight of steps leading to a recessed loggia, whose square columns, faced with four Roman Doric pilasters, define three rectilinear openings. The projecting central pavilion is of rusticated limestone, with three windows in the second story and a crowning pediment. The south or garden facade is almost identical in composition except that the three entrances in the pavilion are spanned by round arches with heavily marked voussoirs and keystones, and the upper windows are unframed. The other windows are framed by stone architraves and sills, and the limestone belt course and rusticated angle quoins are very prominent. The existing broad hip roof, pierced by four interior chimneys located near the ridge, is a replacement of the original roof, possibly a hip-on-hip that was destroyed by fire in 1844. It "is the most architecturally sophisticated of Virginia's surviving colonial mansions."

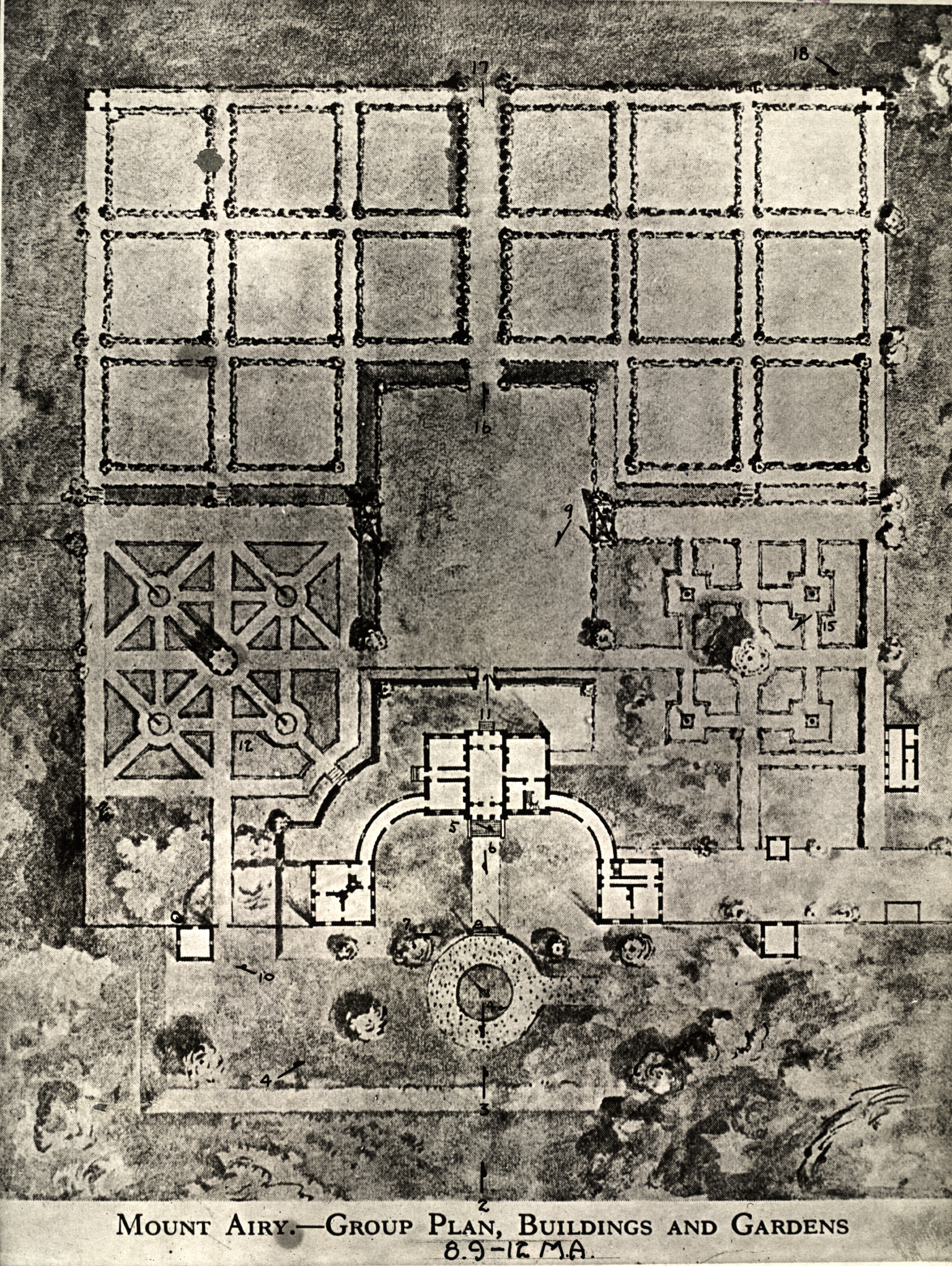
Mount Airy Buildings and Gardens

The south or rear elevation was undoubtedly taken directly from Plate LVIII of James Gibbs' Book of Architecture and the north elevation was less directly derived from a plate of Haddo House in Scotland, shown in William Adam's Vitruvius Scoticus. The two stone two-story dependencies have hipped roofs and central chimneys and their corners are given the same quoin treatment as the main house. The connecting passageways, also of stone, are quadrants covered with shed roofs that are concealed from the north or front. At the junction with the central block, the roofs of the connections are stepped up to allow entrances to the main floor of the house.

== Gardens ==
The shaped terraced levels of its gardens are still clearly visible beneath its modern covering of lawn. Mount Airy has the earliest surviving orangery in North America. A sustainable, owner-operated, flower farm in Virginia's Northern Neck and part of historic Mount Airy Farm occupies the space today. The gardens produce a variety of blooms, herbs, woody ornamentals, & cold season vegetables, for weddings, events, flower bouquets, and floral design.

== History ==
=== Fauntleroy ===
Prior to the purchase by Col. William Tayloe, John Tayloe II's grandfather, the land on which Mount Airy stands was originally purchased by Colonel Moore Fauntleroy in 1651, to add to his existing plantation on the north shore of the Rappahannock River in old Rappahannock County.

=== The Old House ===
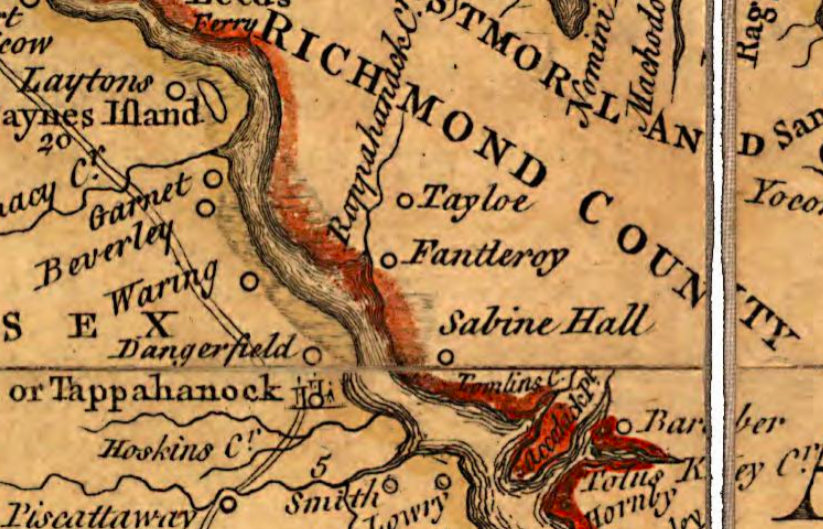
Jefferson Fry Map 1751

In 1682 Col. William Tayloe purchased 3,000 acres from Col. Moore Fauntleroy's son William, and built a 20-room brick dwelling called "The Old House." William's son, Col. John Tayloe I inherited the house upon his father's death in 1710.

=== John Tayloe II ===
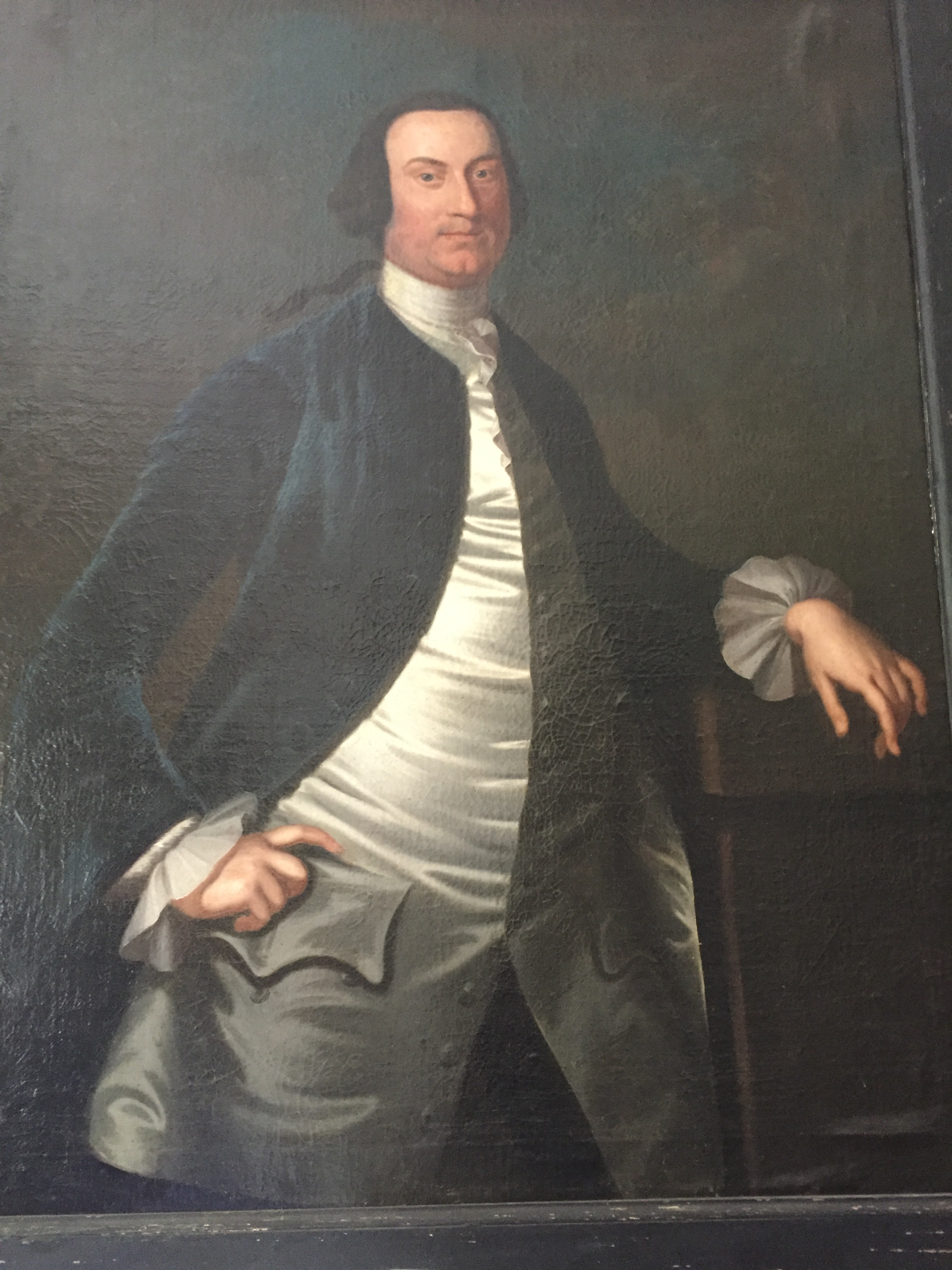
Portrait of John Tayloe II by John Wollaston

The Tayloe family had owned the land around Mount Airy for over a century before Colonel John Tayloe II, a fourth-generation tobacco planter, began building a manor house with a commanding view of the Rappahannock River valley as well as westward towards the town of Tappahannock on a ridge above the broad bottomlands and marshes of the Rappahannock River. The project began around 1748 and finished in 1758. Tayloe used reference books of the day to incorporate then-modern and now-classical architectural themes. As discussed below, John Tayloe II also became a distinguished breeder of racehorses at this plantation. The original stable and a few outbuildings (including a smokehouse and dairy/ice-house) survive to this day.

Col. Tayloe's son-in-law Francis Lightfoot Lee, a signer of the Declaration of Independence, lived nearby, at Menokin a gift from JTII to his son-in-law and daughter on the occasion of their marriage. Tayloe's daughter and her famous husband are buried in the Tayloe family cemetery, approximately 300 yards (270 m) from the manor house.

John Tayloe II, who established the family's turf-racing business, imported Jenny Cameron, Jolly Roger and Childers to Virginia, three of the most important colonial racing imports. He also owned the winning racehorses Hero, Juniper, Single Peeper, Yorick, Traveller and Nonpareil. The first noteworthy colonial horse race was won by Col. Tasker's 6 year old imported mare Selima at Annapolis, Maryland in May 1752. That December, Selima raced in Gloucester, Virginia and beat Col William Byrd's "Trial", as well as this Col. Tayloe's "Jenny Cameron" & "Childers" and Col. Thornton's "Unnamed". That sweepstakes, in four mile heats and with a purse of 500 pistoles, marks the beginning of the competition between Maryland and Virginia in horseracing. In April, 1766, Col. Tayloe's "Traveller" won with ease, beating Col Lewis Burwell III of Kingsmill Plantation's "John Dismal" and Francis Whiting's "Janus." In October Col. Tayloe's "Hero" won the purse, beating Col William Byrd's "Trial" & "Valiant," and Richard Henry Lee's "Mark Anthony." In November, at Chestertown, Maryland, a purse of 100 pistoles was run for by the two most celebrated horses of the era, Col. Tayloe's "Yorick" and Sam Galloway's (of Tulip Hill in Maryland) horse "Selim" (son of Selima). In May, 1767, Col. Tayloe won the "50 Pistoles Purse" near Annapolis as his horse "Traveller" outraced: "Trial" Bullen's, Benedict Calvert's "Regulus" and Dr. Hamilton's "Ranger". In the spring of 1769, Capt Littleberry Hardyman again won the purse with "Mark Anthony," beating John Tayloe's "Nonpareil" and Nathaniel Withoe's "Fanny Murray." In the fall of 1774, at Fredericksburg John Tayloe's "Single Peeper" won the "50 Pound Purse" beating Benjamin Grymes' "Miss Spot," Walker Taliaferro's "Valiant," Spotswood's "Fearnaught," Charles Jones' "Regulus," Procter's "Jenny Bottom," Robert Slaughter's "Ariel" and Peter Presley' Thornton's "Ariel."

=== John Tayloe III ===
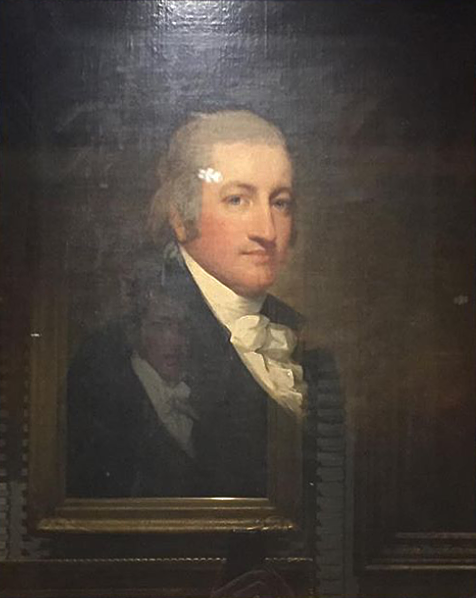
Portrait of John Tayloe III by Gilbert Stuart on display at the Metropolitan Museum of Art

The son of John Tayloe II also continued his father's horse racing legacy at Mount Airy importing Diomed who sired Sir Archie, arguably the most important thoroughbred racehorse of his era. Upon completion of his townhouse, The Octagon he cofounded founded the Washington Jockey Club in the new federal city, Washington, D.C. (which became his winter residence). He also operated an ironworks and shipbuilding facility near Neabsco, Virginia, Neabsco Iron Works, led a company of dragoons into Pennsylvania to suppress the Whiskey Rebellion, and held various local political offices.

=== William Henry Tayloe ===
The son of John Tayloe III, took over Mount Airy in 1828. Its enslaved population continued to increase, even as depleted soil led to crop shortfalls and declining profits. He and his brothers responded in part by acquiring cotton fields in west-central or Black Belt region of Alabama. Between 1833 and 1862, William Henry Tayloe moved a total of 218 enslaved people (many teenagers) about 800 miles from Virginia to Alabama. Because the trans-Atlantic slave trade nominally closed because Britain ended slavery and because the U.S. Constitution's provisions against slave imports took effect in 1808, Virginia became a net exporter of enslaved people within the U.S. Although the U.S. had fewer than a million enslaved people as the 19th century began (mostly concentrated in the coastal and piedmont South), with the invention of the cotton gin and development of internal slave trading, there were four times as many enslaved people four decades later, working from Charleston to Texas.

A fire started by a maid in 1844 gutted the house and destroyed most of the woodwork of master carpenter William Buckland. It was rebuilt within its shell of brown sandstone with limestone quoins and using the original floor plan.

== Current use ==
Mount Airy is a private home and is still in possession of the Tayloe family, currently, Mr. John Tayloe Emery, Sr., and his family, a media and entertainment professional, and is not generally open to the public. The Tayloe family papers are at the Virginia Historical Society.

=== Colonial Rehab ===
Mount Airy was featured in a HGTV show based on the restoration work done to the West Wing of the manor house. The show, called American Rehab Virginia (née Colonial Rehab), was written by Mr. Emery and produced by Magnetic Productions and began airing in 2015, reruns can be found on HGTV and DIY Network.

=== Mount Airy Bluegrass Festival ===
The inaugural Mount Airy Bluegrass Festival billed as "Bluegrass Under The Stars," was held in June 2017 and featured John Starling of The Seldom Scene, his son Jay Starling a member of the band Love Canon on dobro; with guitarist Jesse Harper (Love Canon), bassist Cameron Ralston (Spacebomb), cellist Nat Smith and Courtney Hartman (Della Mae) on vocals and guitar. Staged and produced by John Tayloe Emery Sr. and cousin Robert Tayloe Cook VII, it would turn out to be the Bluegrass Hall of Fame member John Starling's final show. In its second year it was held on June 30, 2018, the lineup included The Seldom Scene, Ralph Stanley II and the Clinch Mountain Boys, The Trailblazers w/ Ivy Phillips and special guests The Waterview Bluegrass Assembly. In 2019 it featured Rhonda Vincent and the Rage, Ralph Stanley II and the Clinch Mountain Boys, Junior Sisk and Ramblers Choice, Josh Grigsby and County Line, and Carolina Blue, on June 28 and 29. Hubs Peanuts has been a sponsor since the inaugural "Bluegrass Under the Stars," while both Alewerks Brewing, Williamsburg, VA, and Champion Brewing Co., Richmond & Charlottesville, have provided beer for the event.

=== Mount Airy Water Fowl ===
Mr. Emery has enhanced the property around the western boundary, on Catpoint Creek, as a waterfowl destination, building new blinds and banking impoundments for flooding along the Atlantic Flyway. The estate holds duck, geese, turkey, and whitetail hunts.

=== Mount Airy Gardens ===
Mrs. Catherine Emery has painstakingly reinvigorated the gardens around the Manor House, including converting a root cellar into a florist building. The operation is based on sustainability and produces a variety of blooms, herbs, woody ornamentals & cold season vegetables for weddings, events, flower bouquets, and floral design.

== Listing on National Register of Historic Places ==
Mount Airy was listed on the National Register of Historic Places on October 15, 1966. It was identified as a National Historic Landmark on October 9, 1960.

== See also ==
- Isaac Meason House, the only other "true cut" Palladian in the U.S., in suburban Pittsburgh.
- The Octagon House, mansion built in 1800 by Col. John Tayloe III in Washington, D.C.
- Benjamin Ogle Tayloe House, a mansion built on Lafayette Square in Washington
- List of National Historic Landmarks in Virginia
- National Register of Historic Places listings in Richmond County, Virginia
- Tayloe House (Williamsburg, Virginia)
