= John Tayloe III =

American planter, merchant, politician, and banker

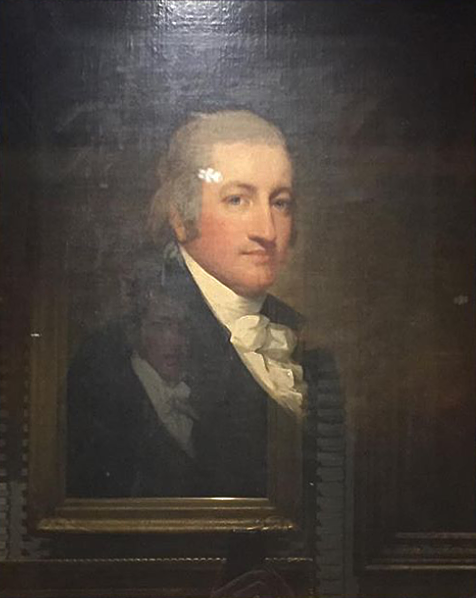
- Portrait of Tayloe by Gilbert Stuart

Member of the Virginia House of Delegates for Richmond County, Virginia
- In office 1793–1794 Serving with Walker Tomlin
- Preceded by: Robert Mitchell
- Succeeded by: position abolished

Member of the Virginia Senate for Lancaster, Richmond and Northumberland Counties
- In office 1798–1802
- Preceded by: Joseph Chinn Sr.
- Succeeded by: Walter Jones

Personal details
- Born: September 2, 1770 Mount Airy, Richmond County, Virginia
- Died: March 23, 1828 (aged 57) Mount Airy, Richmond County, Virginia
- Spouse: Ann Ogle (m. 1792)
- Children: 15, including Benjamin, William, Edward, George, and Henry
- Relatives: William Tayloe (planter) (great-great-granduncle); William Tayloe (the nephew) (great-grandfather); John Tayloe I (paternal grandfather); John Tayloe II (father); Benjamin Ogle (father-in-law)
- Education: Eton College, Cambridge University
- Occupation: Planter, agent
- Known for: Virginia Planter, Builder of The Octagon House, Founder of the Washington Jockey Club, Founder St. John's Episcopal Church, Lafayette Square

Colonel John Tayloe III (September 2, 1770 – March 23, 1828) was an American planter, merchant, politician, and banker. Although his father and grandfather had served on the Virginia governor's council, Tayloe like his father sided with the Patriot cause during the American Revolution and then served in both houses of the Virginia General Assembly. A successful planter, businessman, banker, director, and early Thoroughbred breeder/importer, he was considered the "wealthiest man of his day".

The Tayloe family of Richmond County, including his father, John Tayloe II, and grandfather, John Tayloe I, exemplified gentry entrepreneurship by the diversifying business interests utilizing agriculture to begin vertically integrating their supply chain including shipbuilding and iron production to satisfy transportation needs.

== Early years ==
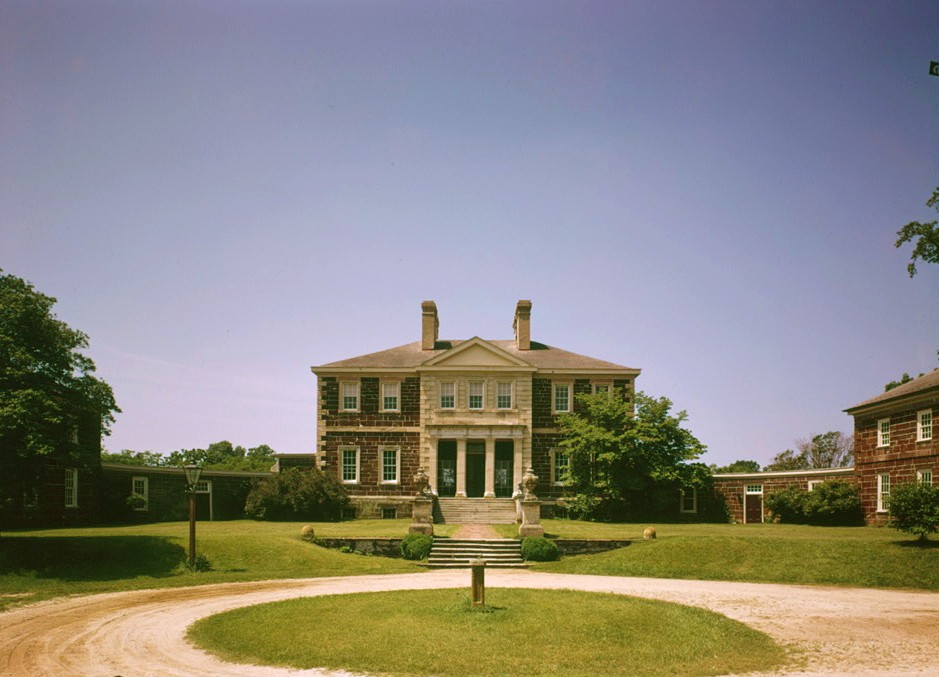
Mount Airy, Richmond County, Virginia

Tayloe was born September 2, or September 13, 1770. the son of John Tayloe II and Rebecca (née Plater) Tayloe, herself from a long-established Maryland gentry family. Her brother was Governor of Maryland George Plater and her brother-in-law was Edward Lloyd III, son of Edward Lloyd II. His paternal grandfather was Col. John Tayloe I of the Old House, and great-grandfather was Col William Tayloe, the nephew of the original settler Col William Tayloe of Kingsmill Plantation, husband of Elizabeth Kingsmill, daughter of Richard Kingsmill of the Virginia Company.

Of the nine children in Tayloe's family, a twin brother did not survive more than a few days, and two sisters died while babies. His surviving siblings were girls.

Tayloe was educated in England at Eton prior to 1788, when he entered Christ's College, Cambridge. His classmates included Wellington, Canning, and Edward Thornton. He was socially involved with Waterford, Lord Graves, and Grey Skipwith, like him, a native of Virginia.

When he arrived back to the United States from England, his familial contemporaries included George Washington, his Sister Sarah "Salay" Tayloe married Captain William Augustine Washington, son of George Washington's half-brother, Augustine Washington Jr.. His sister Elizabeth Tayloe married Edward Lloyd IV of Wye House and Chase-Lloyd House. His sister Rebecca Plater Tayloe married Francis Lightfoot Lee, signer of the Declaration of Independence, and another sister Mary Tayloe had married Mann Page, of Mannsfield Plantation, an exact replica of Mount Airy.

== Career ==
"He succeeded to the largest estate in Virginia" upon his return to the United States in 1790; as he was the only surviving son after his father's death in 1779. Tayloe was named in his father's will to receive most of his slaves, personal property, land and business interests. When his inheritance was turned over to him, the income was US$60,000; within a few years, he increased this to US$75,000. He owned or purchased Gwinfield in Essex County; Douge, Hopyard, and Oaken Brow in King George County; Deep Hole, Neabsco, and Windsor in Prince William County; Doctor's Hall, Forkland, Marske, Menokin, Mount Airy, and Old House in Richmond County, and Nanjemoy in Charles County, Md.

His father's iron and shipbuilding interests were conserved and enlarged by Tayloe. His master shipbuilder at Occoquan was his slave, Reuben. Of Tayloe's other slaves, he reportedly sold 50 of them, mostly young girls, during the period of 1809 through 1828. In addition to shipbuilding at Neabsco Iron Works, Tayloe had other dealings in Prince William County, Virginia. In 1814, he purchased lots in Occoquan, and on the one that fronted Mill Street, he built the Occoquan Hotel. He served as a county postmaster for a time, and his stagecoach lines stopped in Occoquan, giving passengers a chance to disembark here.

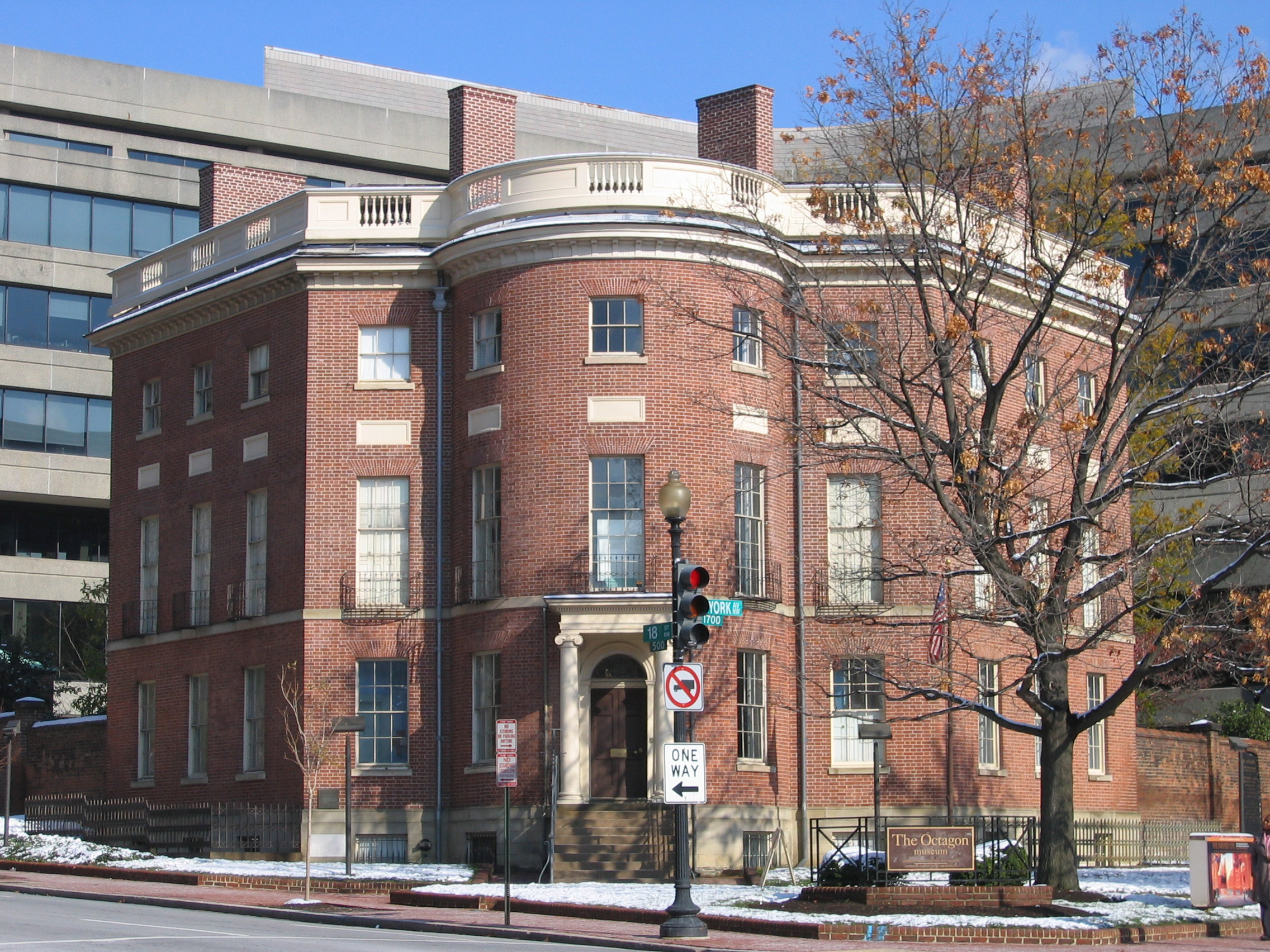
Tayloe's home, the Octagon House, is listed on the National Register of Historic Places in Washington, D.C.

During his residence at his summer home, "Mount Airy", the mansion was enlarged, having originally been built by his father. Among his guests were men of the American Revolution. Tayloe was a member of the Federalist Party, and he was a personal friend of General George Washington. He built the Octagon House in Washington, D. C. in 1799, residing there in the winter. The Octagon was designed by Dr. William Thornton, the first architect of the U.S. Capitol.

While a resident of Washington, he was elected to the board of directors at the Washington Branch of the First Bank of the United States on February 2, 1808, replacing Joseph Carleton, and later served as its president. This bank's board consisted of such men as John Van Ness, Joseph Nourse, and Benjamin Shreve Jr. of Shreve, Crump & Low. Tayloe himself chartered The Central Bank of Georgetown and Washington on March 3, 1817. On March 25, 1812, at the Davis Hotel, he founded "The Produce Bank of the Potomac" with again John Van Ness, Charles Carroll of Bellevue, Elias B. Caldwell, Tench Ringgold, C.W. Goldsborough, and John Graham (diplomat), and later added Roger C. Weightman, and James H. Blake. He was also a director at Bank of Alexandria (Alexandria, Virginia), the Bank of Metropolis and owned shares in the Washington Bridge Company, Potomac Steamboat Company, Chesapeake and Ohio Canal.

He helped organize and founded St. John's Episcopal Church, Lafayette Square in 1814, served as a trustee in 1816 during its construction and upon completion served on the vestry and donated to the parish a communion service of silver, which Bishop William Meade, in his work on the old Churches of Virginia, says had been purchased by Col. Tayloe at a sale of the effects of the Lunenburg Parish Church, Farnham Church, in Richmond County, VA., to prevent its desecration for secular use.

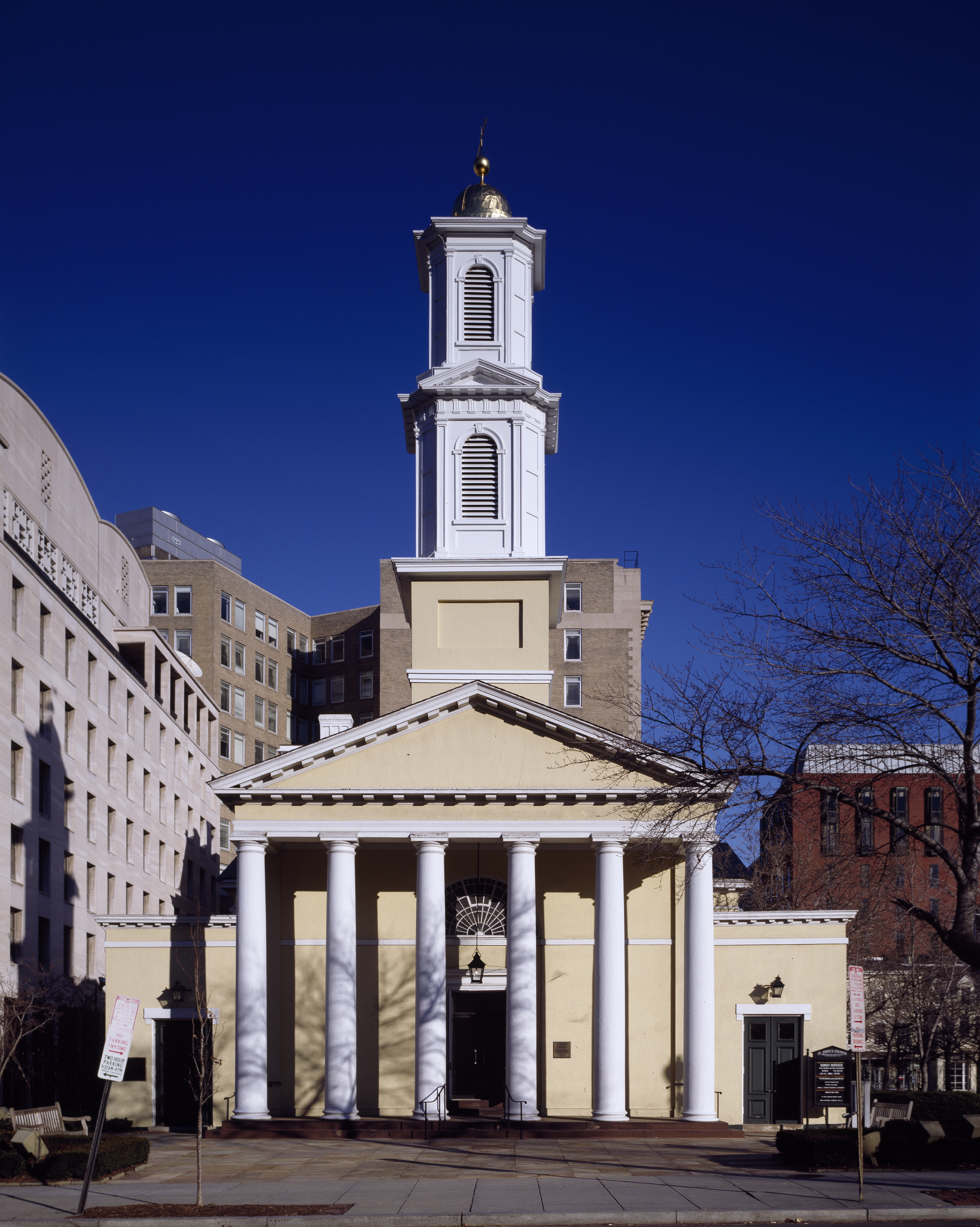
St. John's Episcopal Church, Lafayette Square where JT3 served as organizer, trustee, and vestryman

As Captain of Dragoons, he went to Western Pennsylvania, to help put down the Whiskey Rebellion. In 1799, he was appointed Major of Light Dragoons, U. S. A. by President John Adams. When General Washington wrote to Tayloe a warm letter of congratulation, Tayloe hesitated to accept the commission as he had just been elected as a Federalist to the Virginia Senate, and he feared, as he wrote to Washington, that if he resigned his seat, the place would be filled by an opponent of the administration. On February 12, 1799, Washington replied that he was inclined to believe his civil service would be more important than military service. Tayloe served in the Virginia House of Delegates and the Senate of Virginia, as Delegate and Senator. On the breaking out of the War of 1812, Tayloe was made lieutenant colonel of the cavalry of the District of Columbia and saw active service.

Killian K. Van Rensselaer, American lawyer and Federalist politician who served in the United States Congress as a Representative from the state of New York dined at The Octagon House. "Another invitation recalls one of General Washington's closest friends, whom he persuaded to become a resident of Washington in its infancy, and who built the spacious mansion on the corner of New York Ave and Eighteenth Street, which is one of the surviving relics of the primitive city, not having been destroyed by the British in 1814 - Col. Tayloe: "Mr. Tayloe requests the favor of Mr. Van Rensselaer to dine with him on Sat next at 4 o'clock. The favour of an answer is requested. Wed 9th feb.""

== Horse racing ==
Tayloe's interests included American horse racing, being a leader and top horse breeder in this sport during the period of 1791–1806. His son, Henry Augustine Tayloe, founded the Fair Grounds Race Course in New Orleans with Bernard de Marigny in 1838.

Like his father, John Tayloe III was a successful horseman, and was one of the first breeders to import Thoroughbred foundation stock to the United States from England in the 1780s, keeping some at the Belair Stud. He owned such celebrated racehorses as Bellair II (b. 1786), sired by the imported stallion Medley, the latter being a favorite of Tayloe; and Diomed, whom Tayloe himself imported, and for him sired Sir Archy, whose descendants include Boston, Timoleon, Lexington, Secretariat, American Pharoah, and others.

=== Washington Jockey Club ===
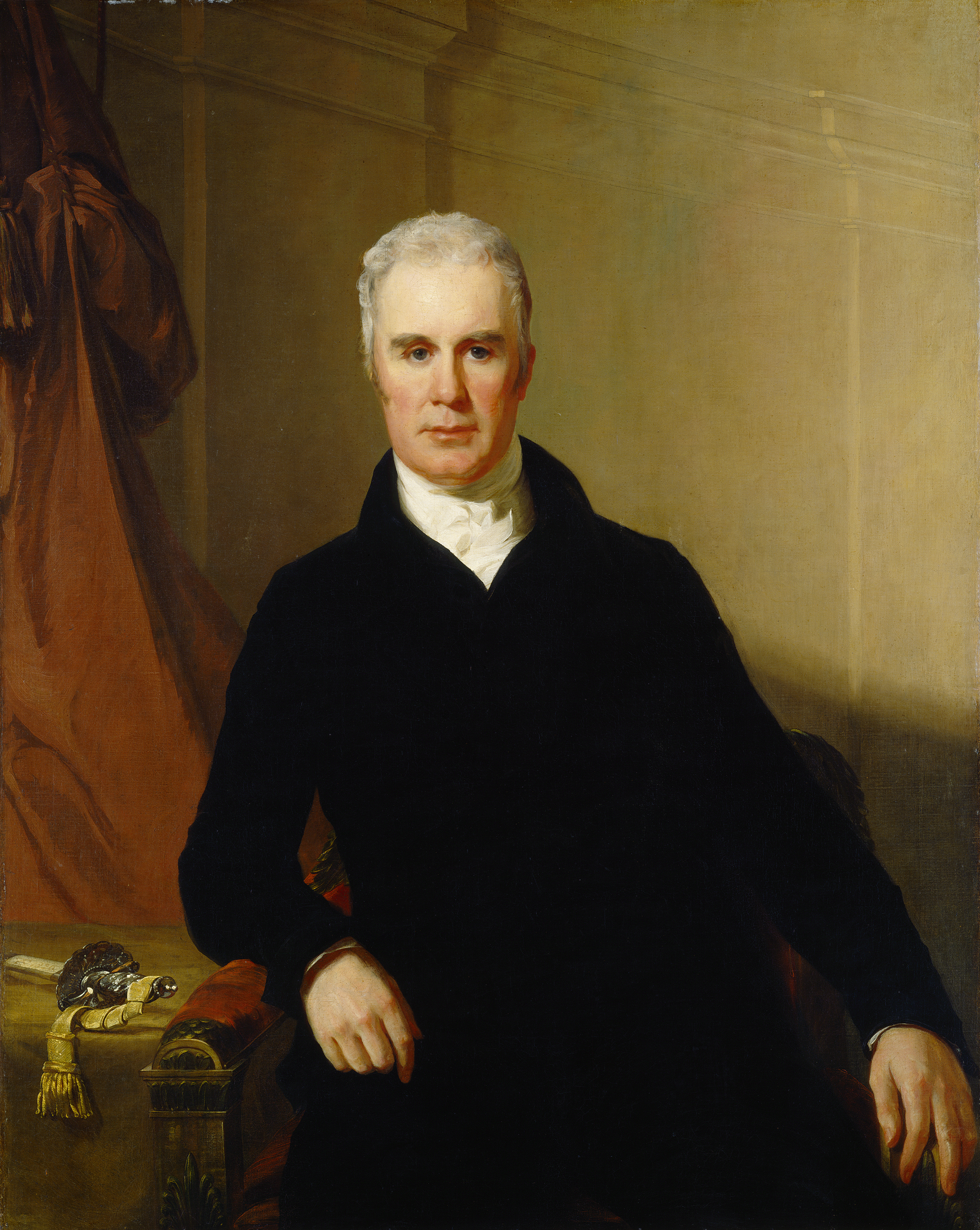
Charles Carnan Ridgely of Hampton by Florence MacKubin

In 1798 a mile track was laid out which extended from the rear of what is now the site of Decatur House at H Street and Jackson Place, crossing Seventeenth Street and Pennsylvania Avenue to Twentieth Street. The inaugural match featured John Tayloe III's Lamplighter and Gen. Charles Carnan Ridgely's Cincinnatus, for 500 guineas, ran in 4-mile heats, and won by the former, a son of Imp English bred stallion Medley. The only initial building was a small elevated platform for the judges. The "carriage folk" took to the infield for views of the contests and the strandees crested the outside of the course. The site of today's Eisenhower Executive Office Building, this first course's history was short lived as it stood in the path of L'Enfant's city plan.

In 1802 the Club sought a new site for the tract, as the current one that lay the rear of what is now the site of Decatur House at H Street and Jackson Place, crossing Seventeenth Street and Pennsylvania Avenue to Twentieth Street-today the Eisenhower Executive Office Building-was being overtaken be the growth of the Federal City. With the leadership of John Tayloe III and Charles Carnan Ridgely and support of Gen. John Peter Van Ness, Dr. William Thornton, G.W. P. Custis, John Threlkeld of Georgetown and George Calvert of Riversdale, Bladensburg, Maryland, the contests were moved to Meridian Hill, south of Columbia Road between Fourteenth and Sixteenth Streets, and were conducted at the Holmstead Farm's one-mile oval track.

== Personal life ==
Coat of Arms of John Tayloe III

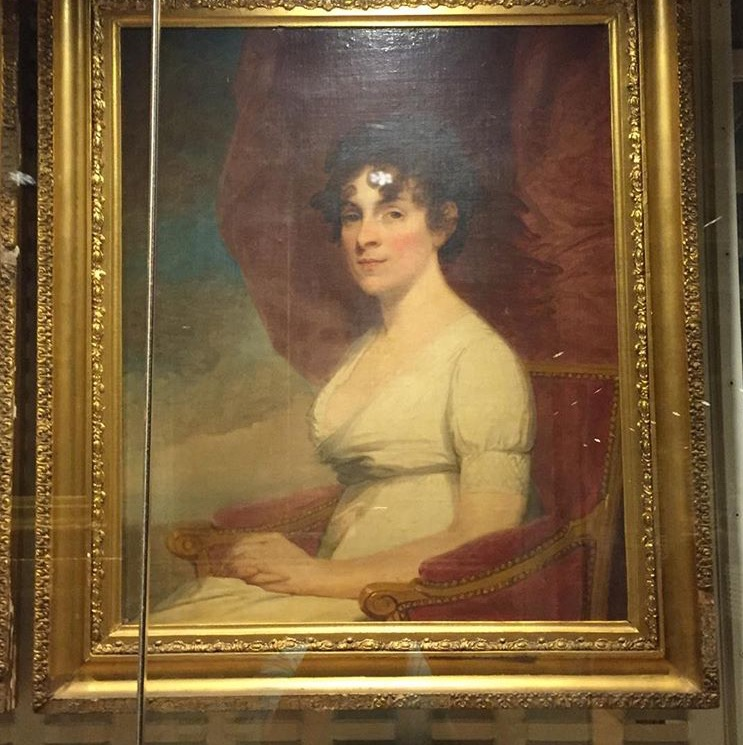
Ann Ogle Tayloe by Gilbert Stuart, Metropolitan Museum of Art.

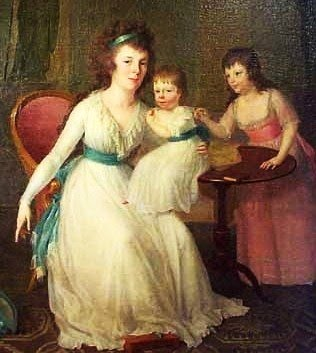
Ann Ogle (Mrs. John Tayloe III) and daughters Rebecca and Henrietta in 1799

He married Ann Ogle (1775–1855) in 1792. She was the daughter of Maryland Governor Benjamin Ogle and Henrietta Margaret (Hill) Ogle, of "Belair", and granddaughter of Samuel Ogle, Proprietary Governor of Maryland. The Tayloes raised a family of 15 children: sons Benjamin, Edward, Charles, William Henry, John, Henry Augustine, George, Lloyd, Robert Carter; daughters Henrietta, Catherine, Rebecca, Ann, Virginia, Ann Ogle, Elizabeth.

The memorial by one of his sons, Benjamin Ogle Tayloe, says that "his manners were refined and elegant. He was distinguished for his nice sense of honor, and a scrupulous regard to his word at all times. His wife was esteemed for sincerity and kindness of heart, graceful and dignified manners, and true and unaffected piety."

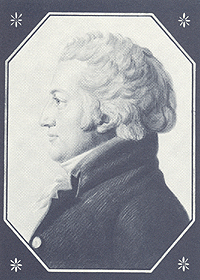

His coat of arms, Purpure a sword palewise proper between two lions rampant addorsed [Argent?], is differenced from the arms displayed by his third-great uncle William Tayloe, grandfather Col. John Tayloe and those of Teylow in Gloucester, England. The sword John III displayed was an epee; the only child of Sarah Knowles Bolton, librarian Charles Knowles Bolton, considered that the lions were likely Ermine rather than Argent. His son Benjamin displayed the arms of his father.

=== Children of John Tayloe III (1771–1828) and Ann Ogle Tayloe (1772–1855) ===
The Tayloes had 15 children over the course of 22 years, 13 of whom survived to adulthood. Seven of the children were born at The Octagon House, and nearly all of them resided there at various times in their lives. None of the children were living in the house at the time of their deaths. The following is a list of the Tayloe children, as well as birth, marriage, and death information for each of them.

1. John Tayloe IV of Chatterton Farm (August 2, 1792 – May 15, 1824). Buried at Mount Airy. Married Maria Forrest (Daughter of Colonel Uriah Forrest). Lieutenant in US Navy, served on the USS Constitution during the War of 1812. Age at death: 31
2. Henrietta Hill Tayloe (December 4, 1794 – June 11, 1832). Died at Tudor Hall, Maryland. Married to H.G.S. Key (brother of Francis Scott Key). Age at death: 38
3. Benjamin Ogle Tayloe of Windsor Farm (May 21, 1796 – February 25, 1868). Died in Rome, Italy, buried in Troy, New York. Married Julia Maria Dickinson of Troy, NY on November 8, 1824. Julia died on July 4, 1840. Benjamin was married a second time on April 17, 1849, to Pheobe Warren of Troy, NY. He lived in the Benjamin Ogle Tayloe House on Lafayette Square, Washington, D.C. Age at death: 72
4. Rebecca Plater Tayloe (September 7, 1797 – March 24, 1815). Buried at Mount Airy. Unmarried. When Rebecca died, the Madisons lived in the Octagon, not the Tayloes. The 1992 edition of the Northern Neck of Virginia Historical Society Magazine states that the family was "grief stricken by the loss through illness of their eighteen-year-old daughter Rebecca Plater while at Mount Airy". Age at death: 18
5. William Henry Tayloe of Mount Airy (January 27, 1799 – April 10, 1871). Died Georgetown (Washington, D.C.). Inherited Mount Airy Plantation, presumed buried at Mount Airy. Married Henrietta Ogle, daughter of maternal uncle Benjamin Ogle II of Belair on May 4, 1824. Age at death: 72
6. Ann Tayloe (March 23, 1800 – April 23, 1800). Died in infancy. Age at death: 1 month
7. Catherine Carter Tayloe II (born April 1, 1801). Died in Barcelona, Spain. Married May 18, 1824, to James Baker of London, then British assistant consul general in Washington D.C., and moved with him to Europe. Age at death: unknown
8. Edward Thornton Tayloe of Powhatan Hill Plantation (January 21, 1803 – December 1876). Born at the Octagon, died at Powhatan, a house he completed in 1832 in King George County, Virginia. Married December 16, 1830, to his cousin, Mary Ogle (sister of Mrs. William Henry Tayloe, Henrietta Ogle). Age at death: 73
9. George Plater Tayloe of Buena Vista (October 15, 1804 – 1897). Married October 14, 1830, to Mary Elizabeth Langhorne, daughter of Colonel William C. Langhorne of Botetourt County, Virginia. Built Buena Vista at Roanoke, Virginia. Age at death: 93
10. Elizabeth Mary Tayloe (March 21, 1806 – March 21, 1832). Born at the Octagon, died in Washington D.C.. Married her first cousin, Robert Wormeley Carter II of Sabine Hall (Warsaw, Virginia) (son of Catherine Tayloe, daughter of John Tayloe II who was married to Landon Carter II). Age at death: 26
11. Henry Augustine Tayloe of New Hope Plantation, Gallion, Alabama (1808–1903). Born at the Octagon, died in Washington D.C. Married April 19, 1838, to Narcissa Jamieson, daughter of John and Virginia Jamison of Alabama. Resided at Gallion, Alabama. Age at death: 95
12. Charles Tayloe of Oaken Brow (February 15, 1810 – 1847). Born at the Octagon. Married August 3, 1831, to Virginia Anne Turner, daughter of Columbia Turner, of King George County, Virginia, daughter of Richard Turner. Age at death: 37
13. Virginia Tayloe (July 23, 1813 – April 5, 1883). Born at the Octagon, died in Baltimore, Maryland where she resided. Unmarried. Age at death: 70
14. Ann Ogle Tayloe (August 11, 1814 – July 25, 1876). Born at the Octagon, died in Baltimore, Maryland where she resided. Married November 30, 1841, at the Octagon to Henry Howell Lewis, who became captain of the Confederate States Navy and was the great-grandnephew of George Washington. Age at death: 62
15. Lloyd Tayloe (November 8, 1815 – August 8, 1816). Born at the Octagon, he died before his first birthday. Age at death: 10 months

== Ancestry ==
Ancestors of John Tayloe III

16. William Tayloe (planter)
8. William Tayloe (the nephew)
17. Elizabeth Kingsmill
4. Col. John Tayloe I
18. Henry Corbin (colonist)
9. Ann Corbin
19. Alice Creyke
2. Col. John Tayloe II
20.
10. Maj. David Gwynn
21.
5. Elizabeth Gwynn
22. Samuel Griffin
11. Katherine Griffin
23. Sarah Griffin
1. Col John Tayloe III
24. Hugh Playter
12. George Plater I
25. Unknown Playter
6. George Plater II
26. Thomas Burford
13. Anna Rousby Burford
27. Ann Burford
3. Rebecca Plater Tayloe
28. Col. John Addison
14. Col. Thomas A. Addison, I
29. Rebecca Dent Wilkinson
7. Rebecca Addison Bowles
30. Thomas Tasker
15. Elizabeth Tasker
31. Rebecca Tasker Isaacs
