= Neabsco Iron Works =

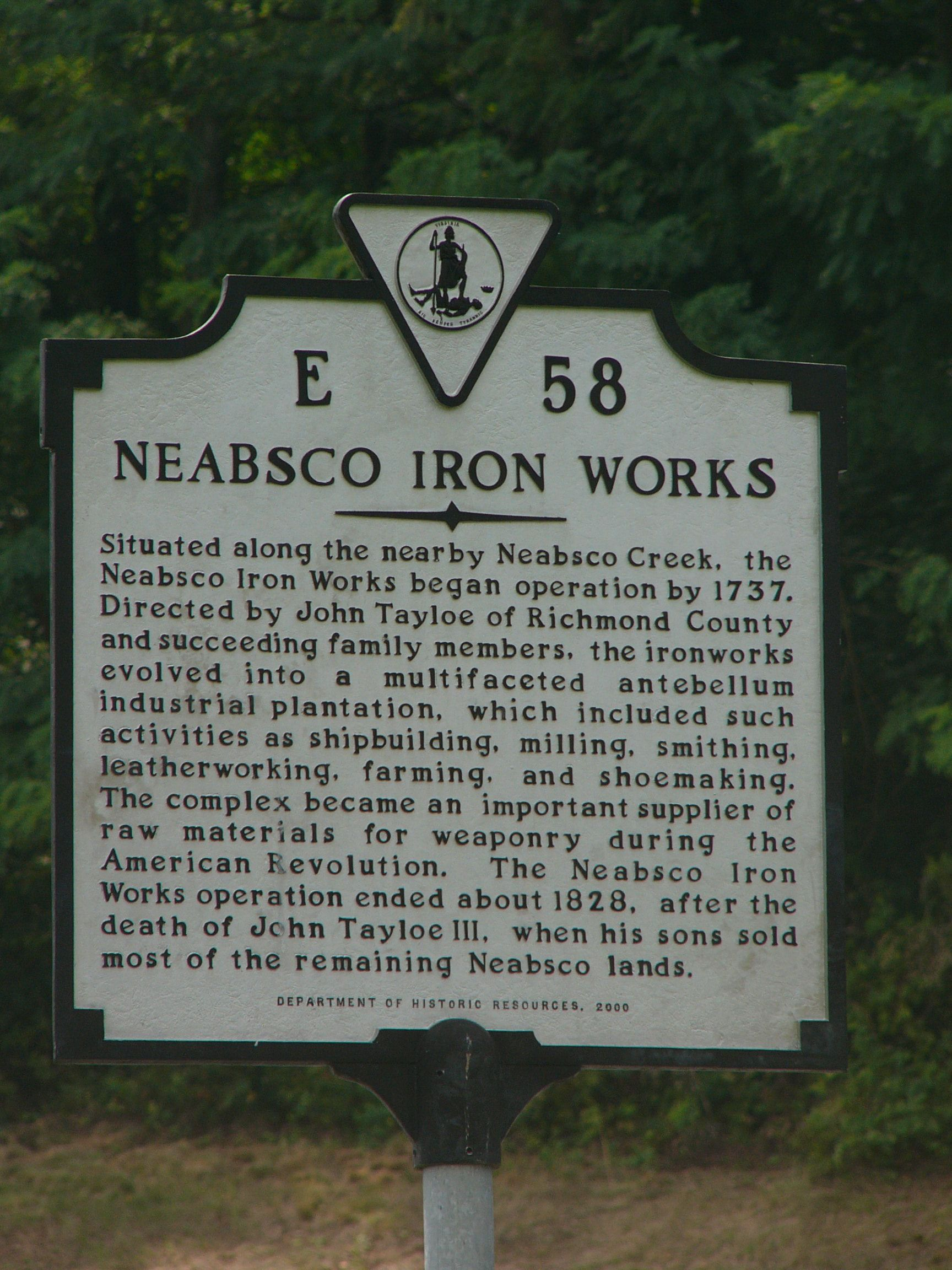
Neabsco Iron Works marker, located near the Neabsco Iron Works on Route 1, AKA Jefferson Davis Hwy, AKA The Kings Highway, AKA The Potomac Path

The Neabsco Iron Works (alternates: Neabsco Company; Neabsco Iron Foundry) was located in Woodbridge, Virginia, US. It was situated on 5,000 acres (2,000 ha) by the Neabsco Creek.

After abandoning the Bristol Iron Works, John Tayloe I established the Neabsco Iron Foundry around 1737. The business became a multifaceted antebellum industrial plantation. Its activities included farming, leatherworking, milling, shipbuilding, shoemaking, and smithing, as well as supplying raw materials used as weaponry during the American Revolution. The business grew and expanded with his son, John Tayloe II, when, in 1756, he bought the Occoquan Ironworks company, eventually running it as one business with the Neabsco.

== History ==
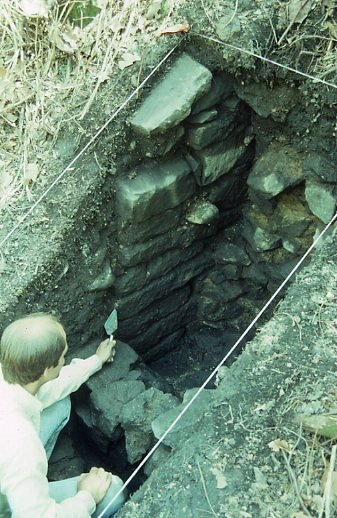
Archaeological furnace dig at the Neabsco Iron Works

The Neabsco Iron Works were the first iron works in northern Virginia. Established around 1737, By John Tayloe I, a wealthy Virginia land owner, who owned several iron works. His son, John Tayloe II, became a partner in the nearby Occoquan Iron Works. Thomas Jefferson wrote in his book, Notes on the State of Virginia, of Iron being forged at Neabsco "from pigs imported from Maryland; and Taylor's forge on Neapsco of Patowmac, works in the same way, but to what extent I am not informed."

The site offered 3–5000 acres of trees for firewood mostly to make charcoal to heat the blast furnaces. Charcoal making, in itself, was as dedicated, expert and involved a process, as Iron blasting. The site also offered large deposits of iron ore. A creek with plentiful running water and adequate fall for water works to operate bellows and mills. As the site is at the cusp of the fall line and coastal plain, the creek was deep enough in part, to transfer pig iron (recently blasted raw unworked iron) by boat less than a mile downstream to Neabsco Harbor on the Potomac River. There the iron could be transferred to ocean-going vessels. It was also close to a major road, the Kings Highway. Because much of the ore, on site, turned out to be of low quality, ore was boated in from Tayloe's mines in Maryland. Most of the labor was provided by slaves and indentured servants.

The works shut down around 1820 as it could no longer compete with cheaper iron being produced in the North and had exhausted its supply of abundant, available fire wood. It is estimated that it took one half an acre of firewood to produce one ton of pig iron.

== Current condition of site ==
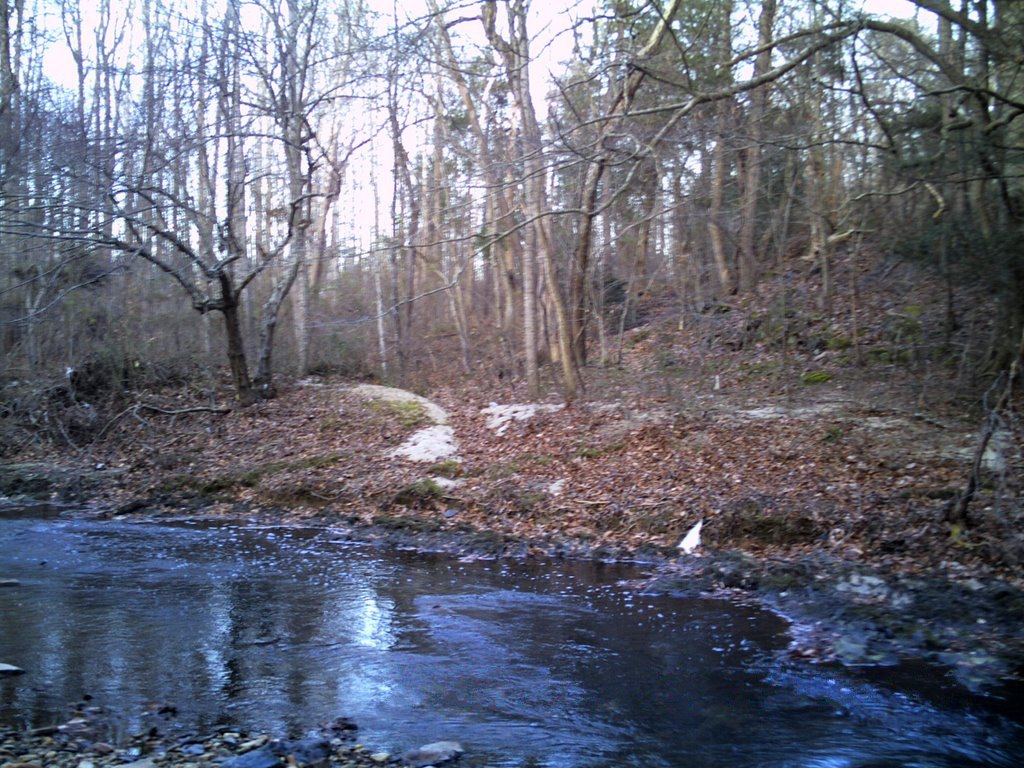
Remnants of water race for furnace bellows

Today little remains of the Neabsco Iron works; the forest has reclaimed the slopes. There are some pits, some stones of the furnaces and foundations of buildings. There are also intact service roads and road remnants, eroded water races. Slag from Iron blasting litter the terraced work areas on the slope above the two furnace locations. The Creek and Neabsco Harbor are now silted in due to deforesting for tobacco farming and rampant development upstream. As a reference, the Neabsco Industrial plantation, contained an approximate area from South at Powell's Creek to North at the Occoquan River, East at Route one, and West at a north–south line drawn at Bonita Fitzgerald Drive. The Occoquan and Neabsco works eventually stripped most of this area of its trees, mostly for charcoal.

The site, being just a fraction of the original industrial plantation, is unique for the Woodbridge, Virginia, area. Most large tracts of land in Woodbridge have been developed, including most of the Neabsco Watershed, but the site is located in a very steep valley of the Neabsco Creek. As Interstate 95 was built adjacent to the site and crosses Neabsco Creek, some of the works may have been destroyed forever. The site is not a protected area, just a neglected hard to access forest and creek area mostly used for off-roading and some hiking. There are some preliminary plans in Prince William County to protect the area as historical.

== Gallery ==
Remnants of the Neabsco Iron Works

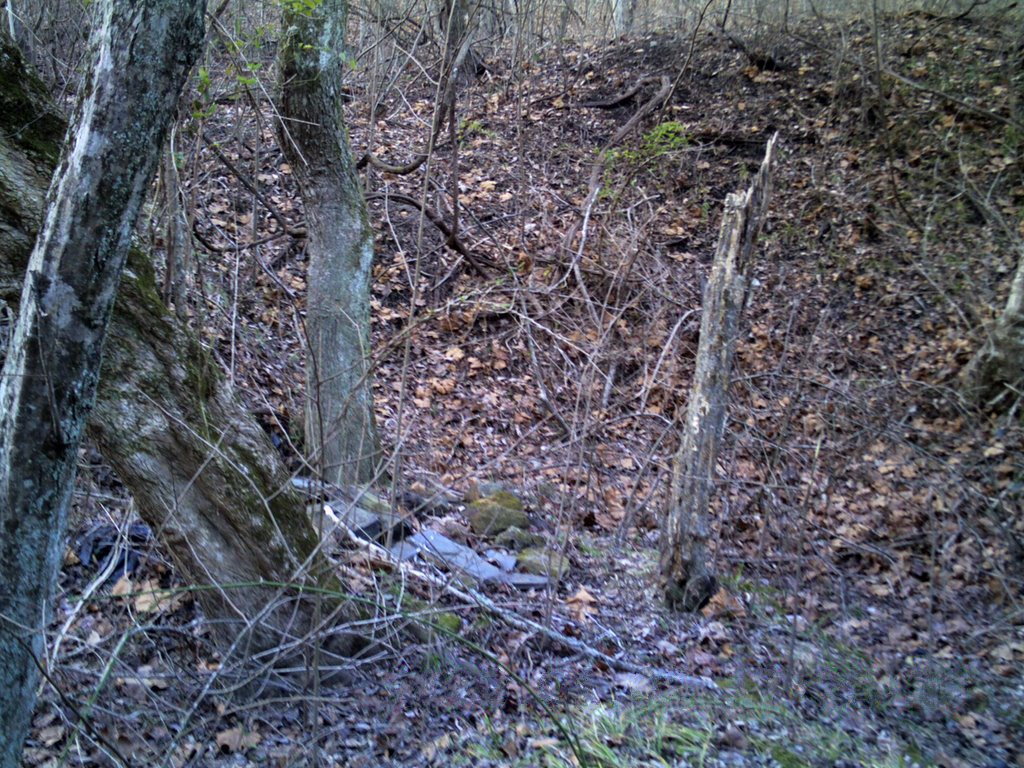
Stones of furnace one, long gone, viewed from creek side

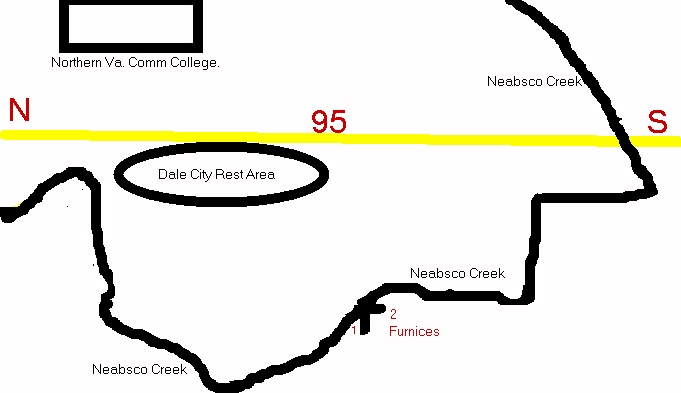
Location of Neabsco Furnace with landmarks.

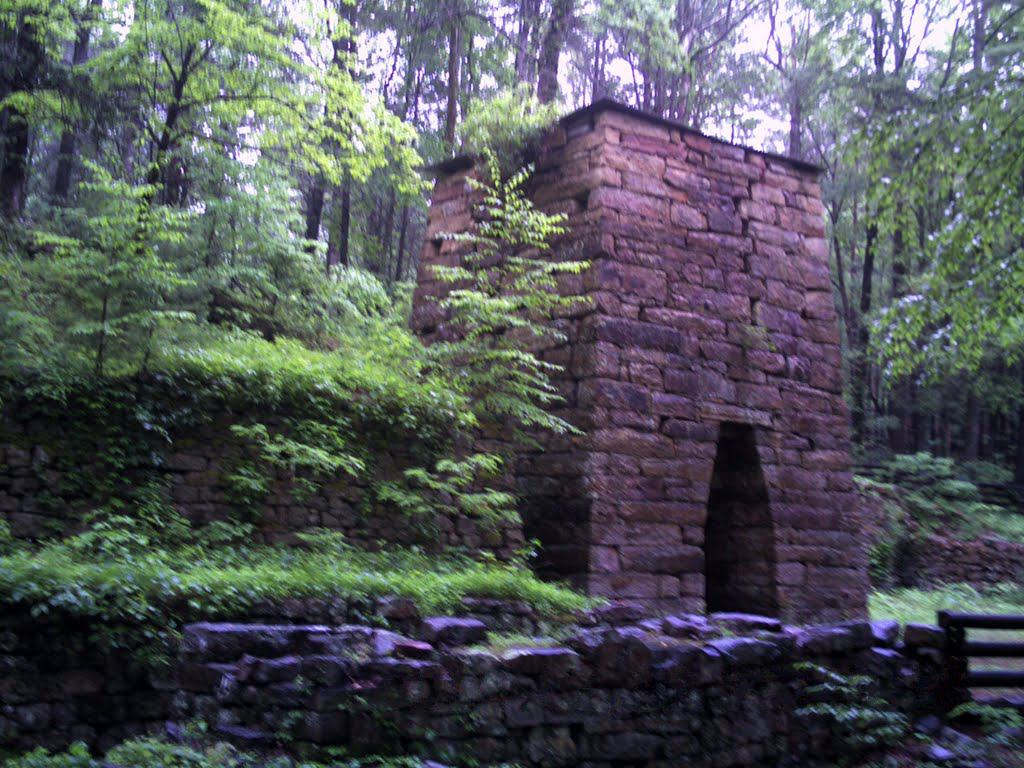
Intact iron furnace At Roaring Run similar to Neabsco's.

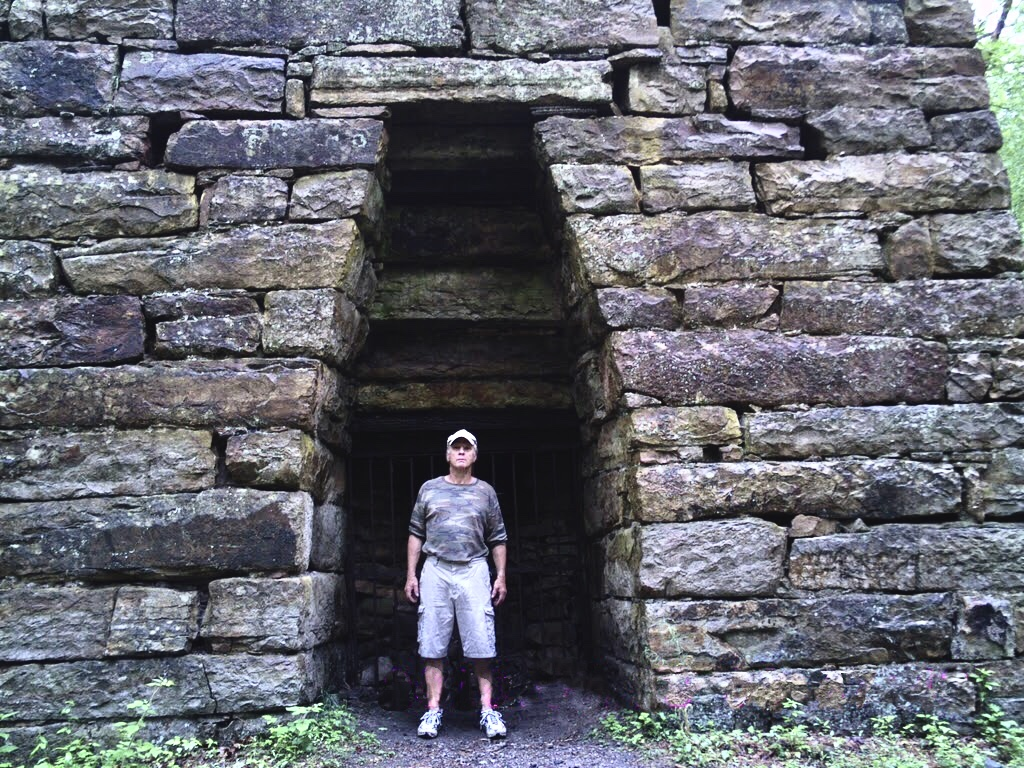
Intact Roaring Run Furnace. Note person for Scale. These colonial furnaces were huge

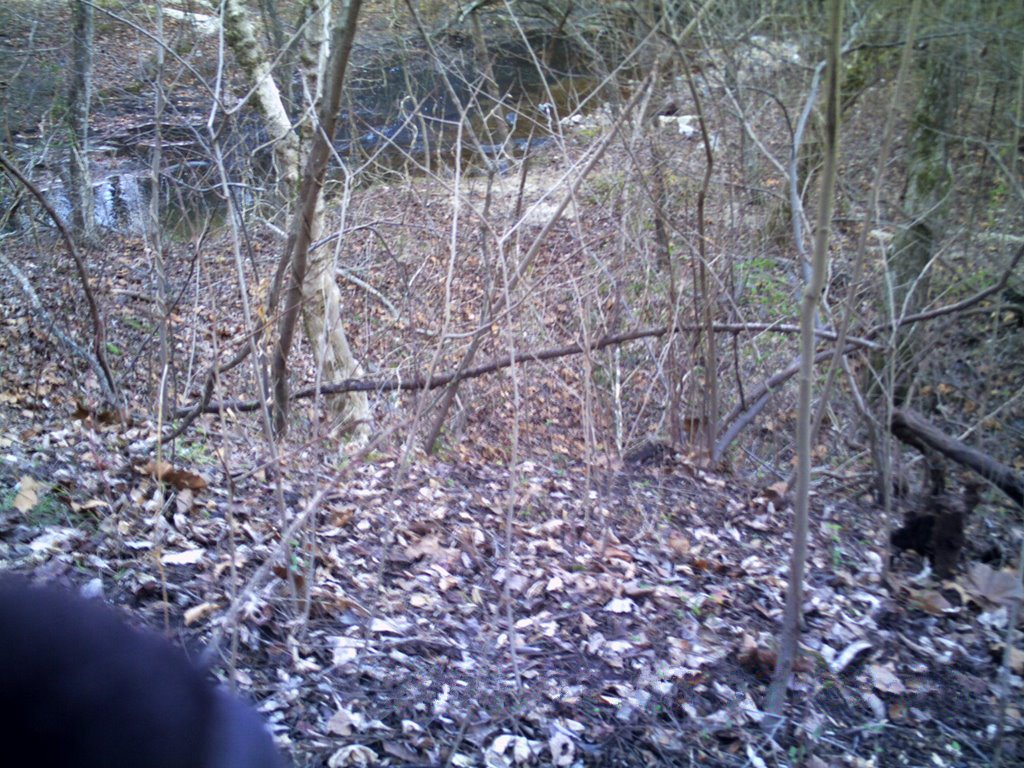
Furnace two remnants, viewed from work terrace above

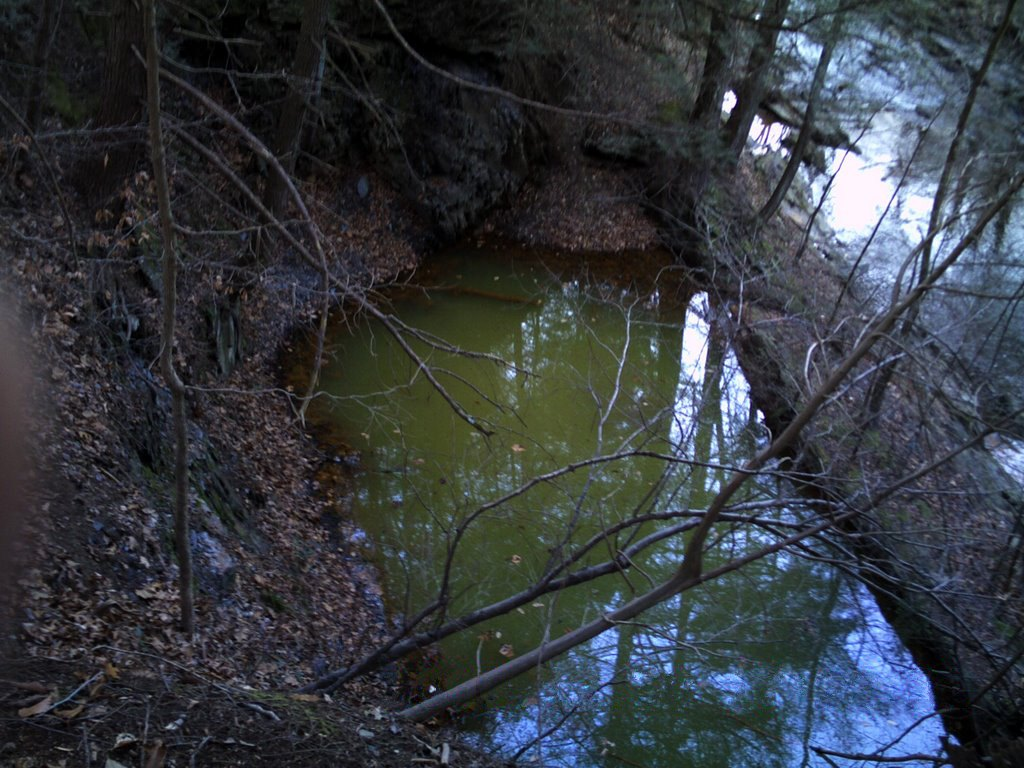
Large dig next to Neabsco Creek, possibly for a Mill works

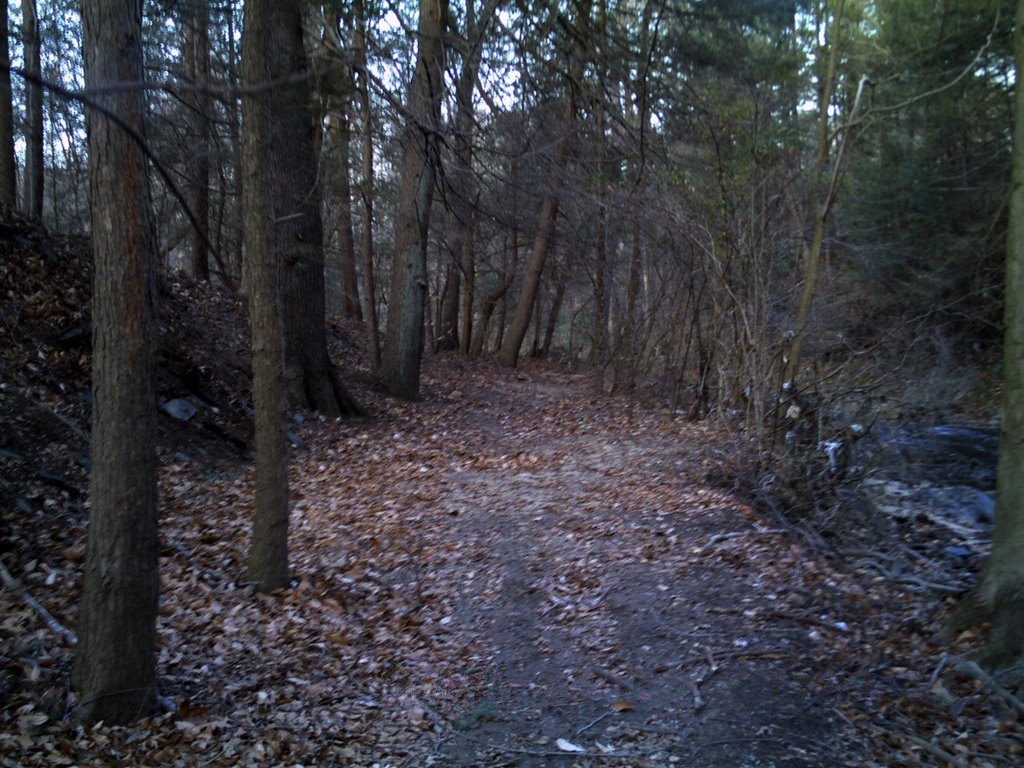
Section of surviving Neabsco service road

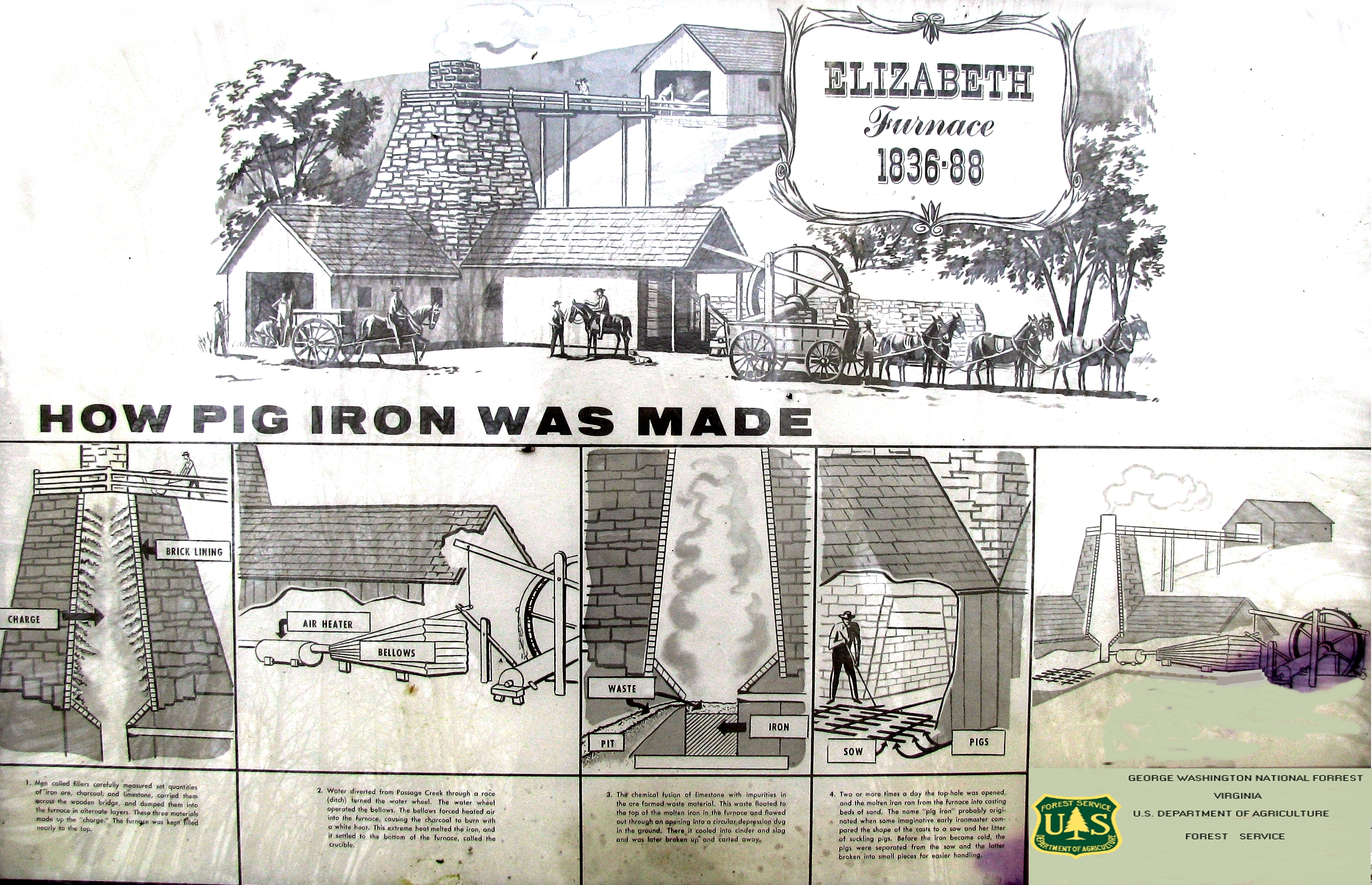
How pig iron is made, in a colonial blast furnace, from a display at Elizabeth Furnace
