= Tayloe House (Williamsburg, Virginia) =

Coordinates: 37°16′21″N 76°41′56″W

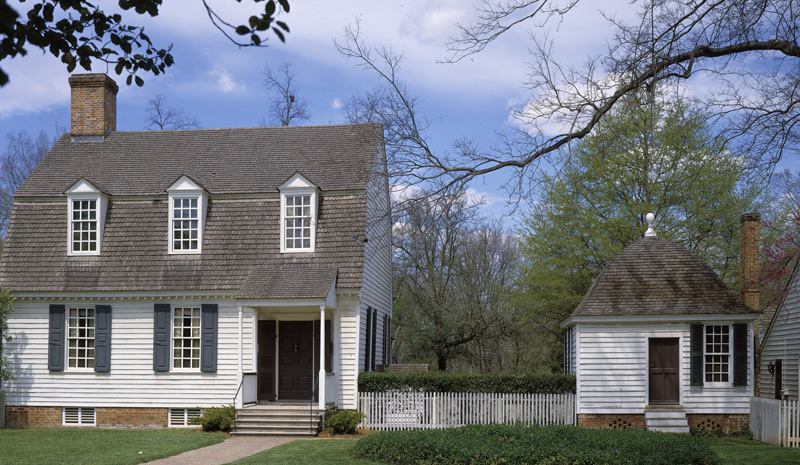
- Tayloe House

General information
- Location: Nicholson Street, Williamsburg, Virginia
- Opened: 1752–1759

The Tayloe House is an 18th-century house in Williamsburg, Virginia. Located on E. Nicholson Street just east of Queen Street, the house was built from 1752 to 1759 and was restored in 1950–1951 by Colonial Williamsburg.

The house was purchased by John Tayloe II in 1759 by Dr. James Carter, resident surgeon of Williamsburg. Tayloe was an influential member of the King's Council under Lord Dunmore and of the first Republic Council under Governor Patrick Henry. Tayloe was a member of the House of Burgesses of Virginia in 1774.

A replica of the house was built in 2004 in Moorestown, New Jersey.
