= John Tayloe II =

American planter, politician, agent, and horse importer/breeder (1721–1779)

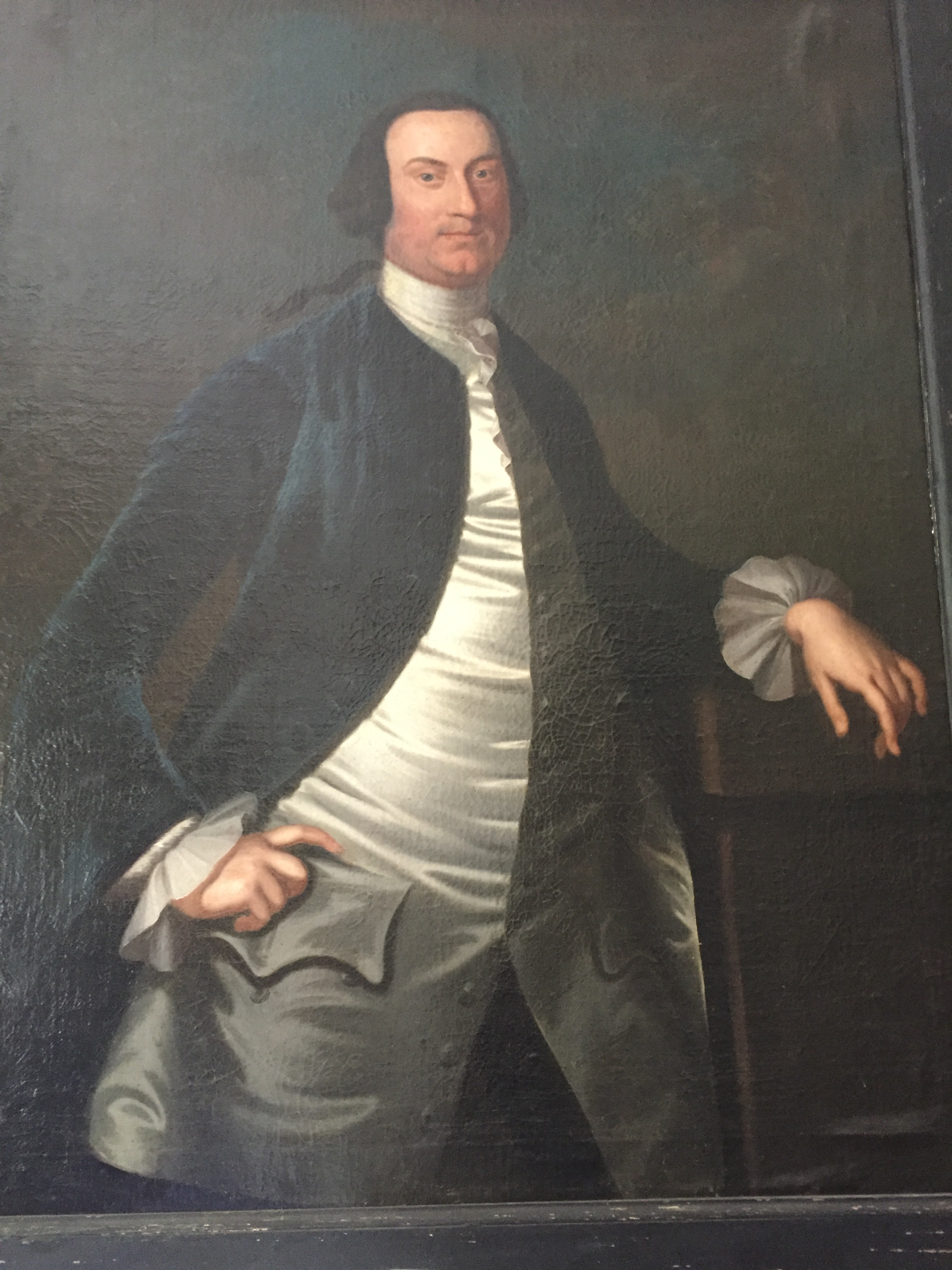

Member of the Virginia Governor's Council
- In office 1757-1774

Personal details
- Born: May 28, 1721 Old House, Richmond County, Virginia colony
- Died: April 18, 1779 (aged 57) Mount Airy, Richmond County, Virginia
- Resting place: Mount Airy, Richmond County, Virginia
- Parents: John Tayloe I (father); Elizabeth Gwynn (mother)
- Relatives: Mann Page (brother-in-law), Edward Lloyd IV (son-in-law), Francis Lightfoot Lee (son-in-law)
- Occupation: Planter, Agent
- Known for: Virginia Planter, Builder of Mount Airy, Owner Neabsco Iron Works, Founder American Thoroughbred Horse Racing

Col. John Tayloe II (28 May 1721 – 18 April 1779) was a Virginia planter and politician who served on the Virginia Governor's Council, also known as the Virginia Council of State. A colonial Colonel in the Virginia Militia, he is better remembered as an ironmaster, horse breeder, racing enthusiast and father-in-law of United States Declaration of Independence signer Francis Lightfoot Lee.

Tayloe built Mount Airy, the Neo-Palladian villa overlooking the Rappahannock River, still held and occupied by the Tayloe family in the 21st century. Tayloe, his father and namesake son were said to exemplify gentry entrepreneurship.

== Early years ==
Tayloe was born in Richmond County at Old House, located along the Rappahannock River, a mile west of Mount Airy. Tayloe was born to Elizabeth Gwynn, daughter of David Gwynn and Katherine Griffin, and her husband John Tayloe I (1688–1747), who became a burgess and member of the Virginia Governor's Council. He had an elder brother, William Tayloe (1716–1726), who died at age 9; a twin sister Elizabeth; and younger sister Ann Corbin Tayloe, born 25 August 1723.

He was educated in England at Cambridge, and possibly Oxford, where he was associated with Thomas Hay, Viscount Dulppin, Paymaster of the Forces during the French and Indian War and George Gordon, 3rd Earl of Aberdeen.

== Career ==
=== Public life ===
In 1744, at the age of 23, Tayloe was a signatory of the Treaty of Lancaster, made with the Iroquois of the Six Nations. It was an effort to reduce warfare in the Shenandoah Valley in Virginia, where Iroquois warriors had been attacking local, less powerful tribes as well as intrepid colonists. Like his father, after holding local offices (but not serving in the House of Burgesses), Tayloe He would also serve on the Virginia Governor's Council, from 1757 until 1774, not long before his death.

=== Planter ===
After Tayloe's father died in 1747, the young man inherited an immense fortune, including 20,000 acres (8,100 ha) and 320 enslaved Africans and African Americans.

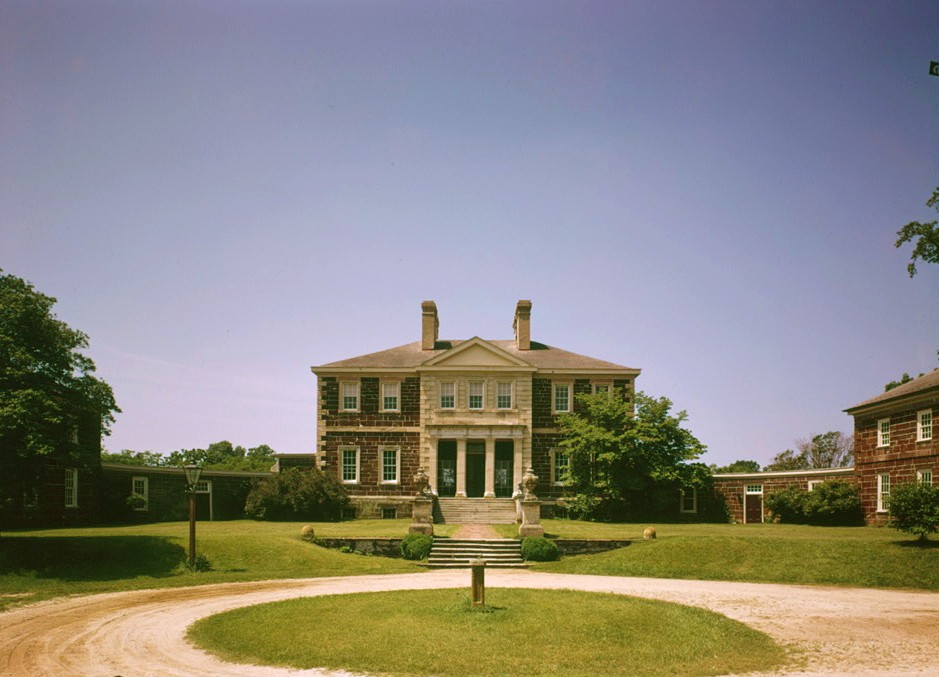
Mount Airy Plantation House, Virginia

In 1748 he began building the mansion "Mount Airy," on a hilltop on the north bank of the Rappahannock River in Richmond County, in the Northern Neck of Virginia. He had inherited the plantation from his father, and it was formerly known as "Tayloe's Quarter." The new mansion was to be constructed on a different site and built from stone. This was unusual, as suitable stone was generally not available in the coastal Tidewater region of Virginia, and skilled stonecutters were rare.

A large deposit of hard gray sandstone was found on the plantation, and it was quarried for the mansion's walls. For window frames and the central pavilions on the entry, which frame the front doors and 2nd-story windows, Tayloe purchased Aquia Creek sandstone. This was similar to the stone later used for construction of the U.S. Capitol and the White House, and in the Octagon House.

Construction of Mount Airy took 10 years. In 1756, Tayloe bought the Occoquan Ironworks company, eventually running it together with the Neabsco Ironworks as one business. The Neabsco Iron Works (alternates: Neabsco Company; Neabsco Iron Foundry) was located in Woodbridge, Virginia. It was situated on 5,000 acres (2,000 ha) by the Neabsco Creek.

After abandoning the Bristol Iron Works, his father John Tayloe I had established the Neabsco Iron Foundry around 1737. The business was developed as an antebellum industrial plantation. Its activities included farming, leatherworking, milling, shipbuilding, shoemaking, and smithing. It also supplied raw materials for weaponry during the American Revolution.

He was a founding member of The Ohio Company.

"In 1748 was organized the first Ohio Company, with Thomas Lee as president. The whole enterprise, [sic], was very much a family affair. Other members were Thomas' sons, Philip Ludwell Lee and Thomas Ludwell Lee; his nephew Richard Lee; his future son-in-law, Gawin Corbin (burgess), the future father-in-law of his son (Francis Lightfoot Lee), John Tayloe II; and such associated "Barons of the Potomac" as Lawrence, and Augustine Washington, Robert Carter II, [sic], and George William Fairfax.

In 1758 Tayloe completed construction of Mount Airy. It introduced a new colonial style, "the first authentic version of what can properly be called colonial Georgian architecture." This style for Virginia colonial estates "proclaimed dominion over its land... a manorial entity intended for a long succession of eldest sons." Mount Airy is the first dated example in this country of a broad center hall free of stairs which was used as a sitting room. It was the first house in the colony to use curved walls to enclose the "dependency connectors," or passages to the east and west outbuildings (the west dependency being the kitchen and the east the building in which the family had been living.) It was also among the first to install the "Palladian" window, a central arched opening rising above rectangular side openings.

There is a portico in front and one behind. The front portico opens on a terrace, cut from the rolling lawn by a balustrade of red sandstone. Marble steps lead from the lawn to the terrace and from the terrace to the portico. From the portico is an entry to a baronial hall, running entirely through the house. On the right is a small hall from which a stairway runs, and opening upon it and the main hall is the great dining room. On the left there is a large drawing room. Going transversely from the big hall to the end of the house is another narrower hall in which is another stairway. Across this hall to the back of the house is the library and a sitting room. The second story consists of beautiful, airy bedrooms. From the middle mansion on each side run corridors of glass to two brick houses containing 4 rooms. From the back of the house runs a green sunken bowling alley; one each side are beautiful trees and the gardens. The front lawn contains a collection of hollies, cedars and other evergreens.

In 1759 Tayloe bought what is still identified as the Tayloe House at Williamsburg, Virginia, on Nicholson Street, for use as his winter residence during sessions of the King's Council. He paid James Carter, a surgeon and apothecary, 600 pounds for the newly built house, a large amount in those days for a frame house, and triple what it had cost Carter. The house was restored in 1950.

Tayloe was renowned for his hospitality at both residences. At Mt. Airy he had created a band for guest entertainment, composed of house slaves, whom he had instructed in music. Lord Dunmore, Royal Governor of Virginia, visited Mt. Airy in the years before the rebellion. The Tayloes were in the same circles as the Lees, Jeffersons, Madisons, Adams and Washingtons.

During the American Revolution, Tayloe supplied the Virginia Navy with "Cannonball, Plant, and Pigg iron". He served in public office as a member of the county court and he sat on the Virginia Council of State. He held approximately 250 slaves. He was an influential member of the King's Council, under Lord Dunmore, and of the first Republic Council, under Governor Patrick Henry.

Tayloe owned more than 20,000 acres (8,100 ha) on the Northern Neck, and land on the opposite side of the Rappahannock River in Essex County, Virginia, in addition to lands along the Potomac River in Virginia and Maryland.

His plantation was supported by a variety of farms across three counties: Gwynnfield (Essex County), Hopyard (King George County), Marshe, Old House (Richmond County)). Forkland (adjacent to Old House), and Menokin (Richmond County). Other plantations were in Stafford, Faquier and Loudon Counties in Virginis and Tayloe’s Neck in Charles County, Maryland.

In 1751, Tayloe acquired Menokin Tract, adjacent to Mount Airy. After his daughter Rebecca married Francis Lightfoot Lee, Tayloe built the plantation house of Menokin in 1769 for his son-in-law. In 1765, he was taxed for 8,942 acres (3,619 ha) of land in Loudoun County.

=== Horse racing ===
John Tayloe II, and subsequently his sons John Tayloe III and William Henry Tayloe, operated Mount Airy as a successful thoroughbred horse stud farm. John Tayloe II owned Hero, Juniper, Single Peeper, Yorick, Traveller, Nonpareil, and imported Jenny Cameron, Jolly Roger and Childers (by Flying Childers) from England to Virginia. In December 1752, at Gloucester, his horse Selima beat Col William Byrd's "Trial", Col Tayloe's "Jenny Cameron" and "Childers", and Col Thornton's "Unnamed". It was a sweepstakes for a purse of 500 pistoles, four mile heats. This race marks the beginning of the competition between Maryland and Virginia in the annals of thoroughbreds and racing.

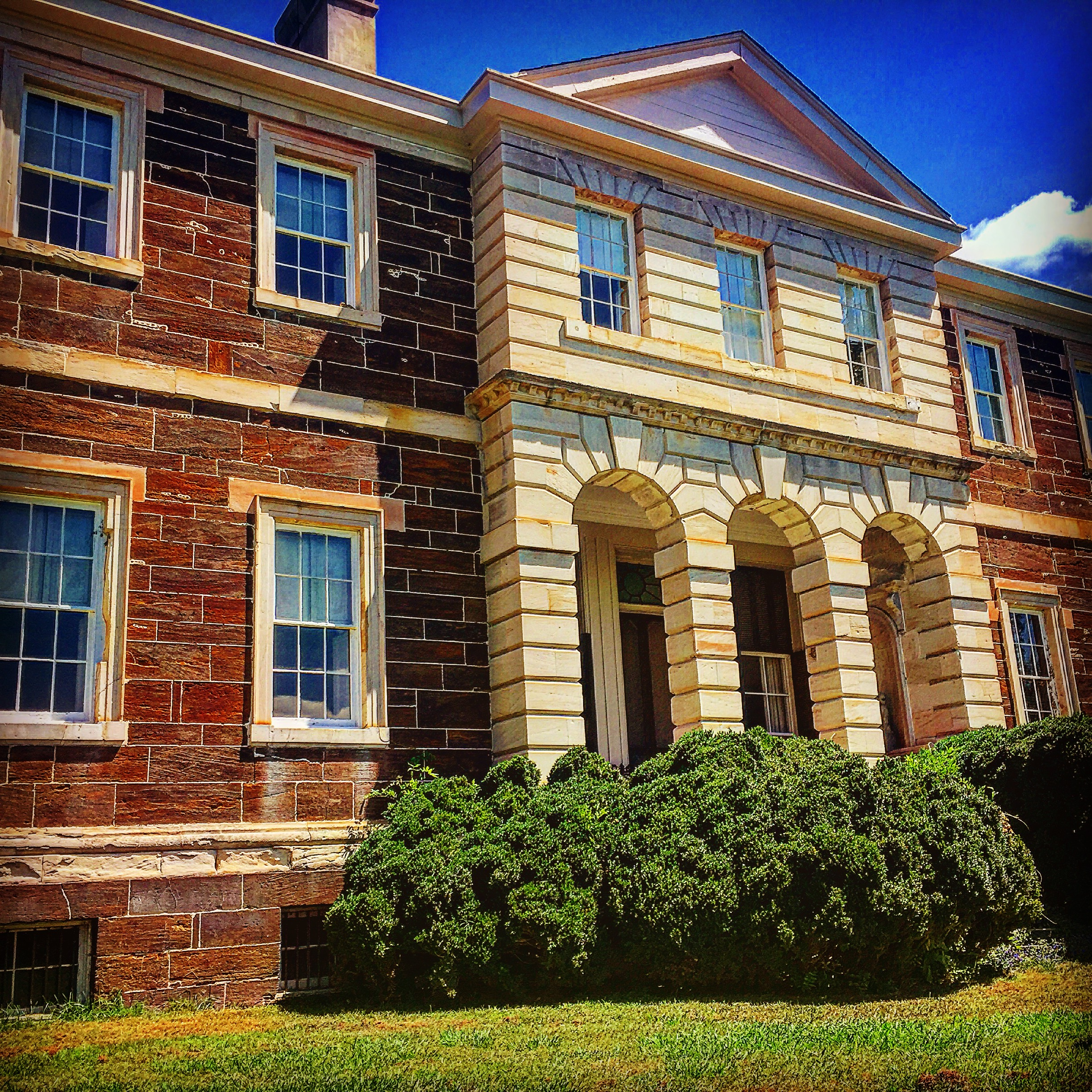
River Facade of Mount Airy, Richmond Co, Virginia

In April 1766, Col Tayloe's "Traveller" won with ease, beating Col Lewis Burwell III's "John Dismal" and Francis Whiting's "Janus." In October Col Tayloe's "Hero" won the purse, beating Col William Byrd's "Trial" and "Valiant," and Richard Henry Lee's "Mark Anthony." In November, at Chestertown, Maryland, a purse of 100 pistoles was competed for by the two most celebrated horses on the turf, Col Tayloe's Virginia horse "Yorick" and Sam Galloway of Tulip Hill's Maryland horse "Selim" (out of Selima).

In May 1767, Col Tayloe won the "50 Pistoles Purse" with his horse Traveller near Annapolis against: "Trial" owned by Bullen, "Regulus" Calvert, and "Ranger" (Dr. Hamilton). In the spring of 1769, Capt Littleberry Hardyman again won the purse with "Mark Anthony," beating John Tayloe's "Nonpareil" and Nathaniel Wlthoe's "Fanny Murray." In the fall of 1774, at Fredericksburg, John Tayloe's "Single Peeper" won the 50 Pound Purse, beating Benjamin Grymes' "Miss Spot," Walker Tailaferro's "Valiant," Spotswood's "Fearnaught," Charles Jones' "Regulus," Procter's "Jenny Bottom," Robert Slaughter's "Ariel", and Peter Presley' Thornton's "Ariel."

== Personal life ==
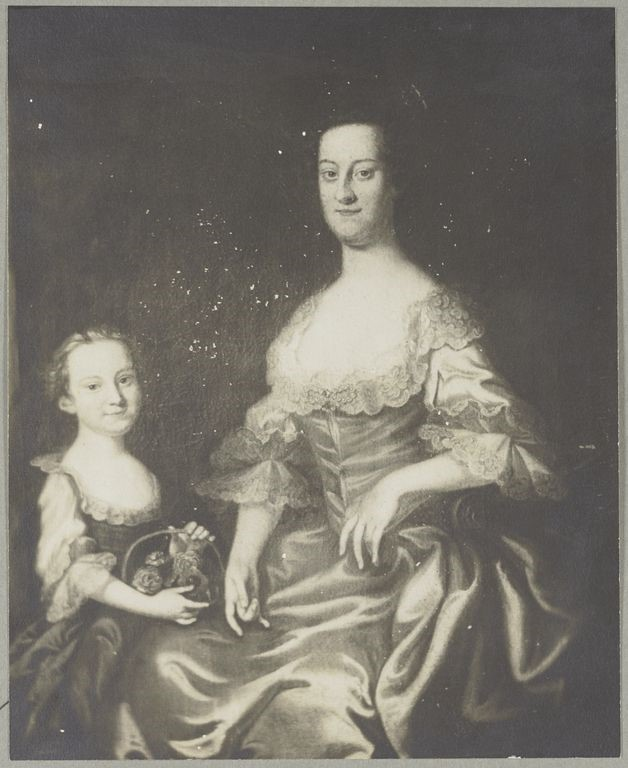
Rebecca Plater Tayloe and Mary Tayloe

He married Rebecca Plater, sister of George Plater, at the house of Ralph Wormly, Esq., in Middlesex County, Virginia. They had eleven children together, two of whom died in infancy; their only son was their tenth child, John Tayloe III.

Elizabeth Tayloe (1750-1825) married Edward Lloyd IV of Wye House and Chase-Lloyd House. They were the parents of Elizabeth Lloyd Harwood; Maryland governor Edward Lloyd; Maria Lloyd; Rebecca Lloyd; and Mary Tayloe Key, wife of Francis Scott Key.

Rebecca Plater Tayloe (1752-1797) married Francis Lightfoot Lee, signer of the Declaration of Independence, and resided at Menokin, a plantation given to them by John Tayloe II.

Ann Corbin Tayloe II (1753-1853) married Thomas Lomax. They had a son, John Tayloe Lomax.

Eleanor Tayloe (1756-1815) married Ralph Wormeley V and resided at Rosegill.

Mary Tayloe (1759-1803) married Mann Page, son of Ann Corbin Tayloe I, daughter of John Tayloe I. He was raised at Rosewell plantation with his brother, Virginia governor John Page, but moved to Spotsylvania County and established his own plantation, known as Mannsfield, near Fredericksburg, a near copy of Mount Airy. Their daughter Maria married Lewis Burwell.

Cathrine Griffin Tayloe (1761-1798) married Colonel Landon Carter II of Sabine Hall, great-grandson of Elizabeth Tayloe, sister of John Tayloe I.

Sarah "Salay" Tayloe (1765-1834) married Captain William Augustine Washington, son of George Washington's half-brother, Augustine Washington Jr., and his wife, Anne (née Aylett).

Jane Tayloe (1774-1816) married Robert Beverley, grandson of William Beverley.

He supported the Episcopal Church.

In his will, Tayloe made provision for the Tayloe Charity Fund to be continued as a legacy forever. It met legal challenges in later years.

== See also ==
- Billy (slave), a slave reportedly owned by Tayloe and who was charged with treason
