= John Tayloe I =

American planter, militia officer, and businessman

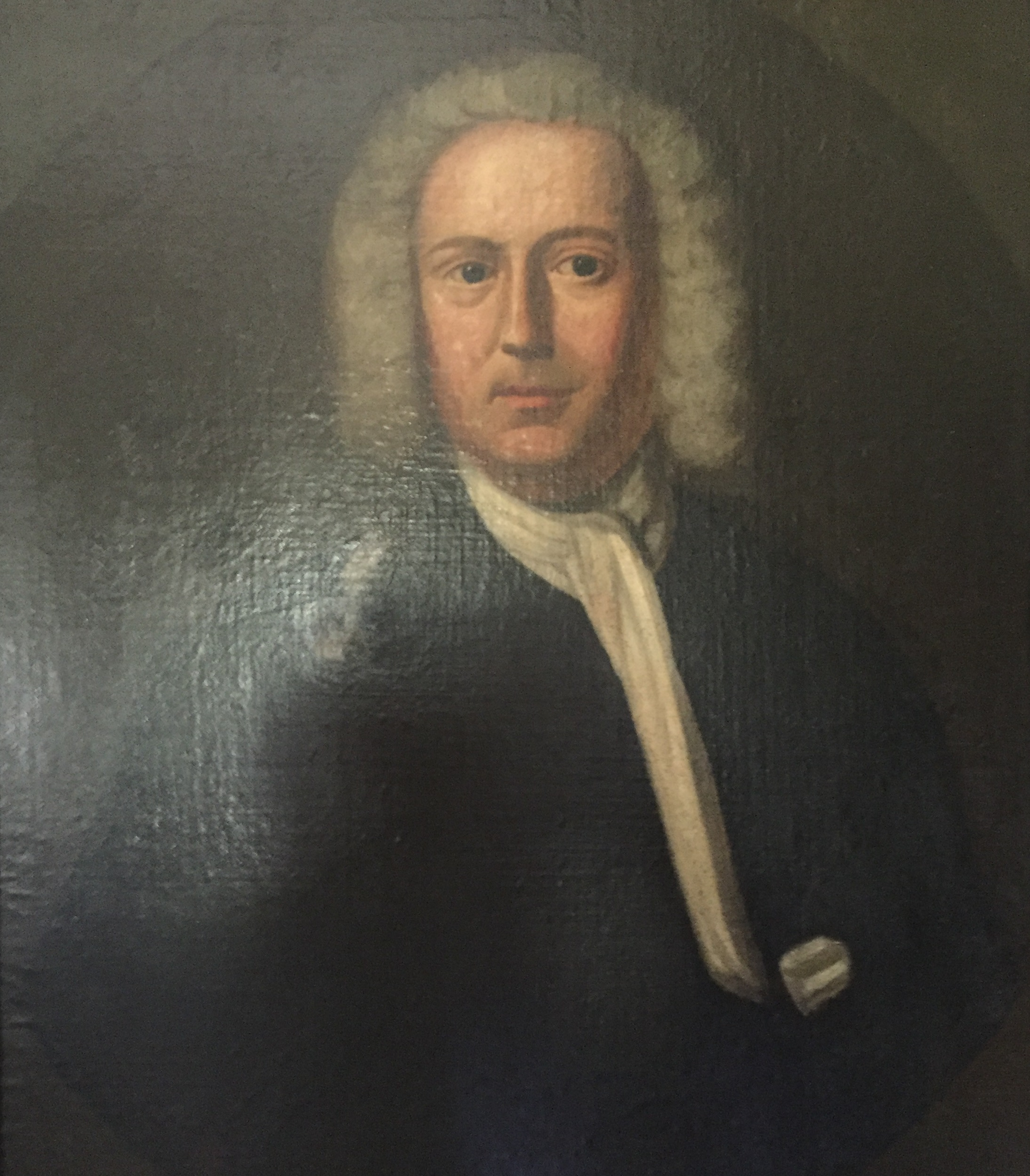
- Portrait of Tayloe

Member of the Virginia Governor's Council
- In office 1732-1744

Member of the Virginia House of Burgesses representing Richmond County
- In office 1728–1732 Serving with Charles Grymes
- Preceded by: Thomas Griffin
- Succeeded by: Daniel Hornby

Personal details
- Born: February 15, 1688 Richmond County, Virginia
- Died: November 15, 1747 (aged 59) Old House, Richmond County
- Resting place: Mount Airy, Richmond County, Virginia
- Occupation: Planter, Agent
- Known for: Virginia Planter, Progenitor of the Tayloe's of Mount Airy

Colonel John Tayloe I (February 15, 1688 – November 15, 1747) was an American planter, merchant and politician who became one of the richest plantation owners and businessmen in Virginia, along with serving in both houses of the colonial legislature and founding a political dynasty. Sometimes referred to as "Hon. Colonel of the Old House", together with his son, John Tayloe II, and grandson, John Tayloe III, he exemplified gentry entrepreneurship diversifying business interests through vertical integration.

== Early years ==
Coat of Arms of John Tayloe I

John was the firstborn son of the former Anne Corbin and her emigrant husband, Colonel William Tayloe (1645–1710). William Tayloe emigrated to the Colony of Virginia from Gloucester, England during England's religious wars and tobacco boom. Col. In 1650 he bought and began developing land in what was the Northern Neck Proprietary and which became Lancaster and Richmond Counties. He built the family's first house known as "The Old House," his son John Tayloe II would go on to build Mount Airy, the ancestral family seat. About three years before this boy's birth, in 1685, William had married Anne (1664–1694), daughter of merchant, planter and burgess Henry Corbin (circa 1629–1676) and his wife Alice (Eltonhead), of "Buckingham House", in nearby Middlesex County. His siblings included Elizabeth (born 1686), and William (1694–1770).

== Career ==
=== Planter ===
On February 7, 1710, John Tayloe was granted administration of the estate of his father, Colonel William Tayloe, late of Richmond County, deceased. Although barely of legal age when his father died, as the firstborn son, John Tayloe inherited land (including "Tayloe's Quarter" and “The Old House”) as well as enslaved people. Tayloe acquired large holdings on both sides of the Potomac River- 3,000 acres, then known as "Nanjemoy", now Tayloe's Neck, in Charles County, Maryland rich in Iron Ore; "Gwynnfield", from his marriage, in Essex County, Virginia, and in 1734- 5,000 acres called "Neabsco", not far from the present day Quantico or Dumfries, in Prince William County, Virginia. Through his lifetime he expanded both with other businesses, including two ironworks: Bristol Iron Works and Neabsco Iron Works, while his son would found Occoquan Iron Works. In 1711 Francis Yeates, of Richmond County, was allowed by Act of Assembly to convey certain lands to John Tayloe, Gent. He also became a liberal supporter of the Established Church.

=== Ironmaster ===
In 1721, Tayloe began diversifying into manufacturing. With John Lomax, John Tayloe established a corporation for the purposes of mining, smelting, and trading, which was called the Bristol Iron Works (now commemorated by a Virginia Historical Marker on Route 3 below Rollins Fork). Located along the Rappahannock River across from Horse Head Point, the name also notes the emigrant ironworker, John King and Company from Bristol, England, and was in operation by 1729.

Almost a decade later, around 1737, John Tayloe I established the Neabsco Iron Works (alternates: Neabsco Company; Neabsco Iron Foundry) near modern Woodbridge, Virginia. Situated on 5,000 acres (2,000 ha) by the Neabsco Creek, it became a multifaceted antebellum industrial plantation, with farming, leatherworking, milling, shipbuilding, shoemaking, and smithing, and later supplied raw materials for weaponry during the American Revolution.

=== Politician ===
John Tayloe began holding local offices in Richmond County upon reaching legal age. He served as High Sheriff of Richmond County and was in command of the county militia in 1713 at age 26. By April 6, 1715, he was a justice of Richmond County. Although his father William Tayloe had died in 1710 after being elected a Burgess and before he could assume his legislative office in Williamsburg, John Tayloe was elected as a burgess and sat in the sessions of 1728 and 1730.

Tayloe achieved the highest status of a man born in the colony when he became a member of Colonial Council in 1732, and continued to serve in the upper house of the Virginia General Assembly until shortly before his death (the chamber's name transforming into the "King's Council").

Politically, Tayloe was well-connected and used those connections to help his business interests. In 1738, about a year after establishing a second ironmaking locale as described below, Tayloe convinced the Governor's Council of Virginia to "relieve himself and other adventurers in Iron Mines from port duties on iron ore imported from Maryland."

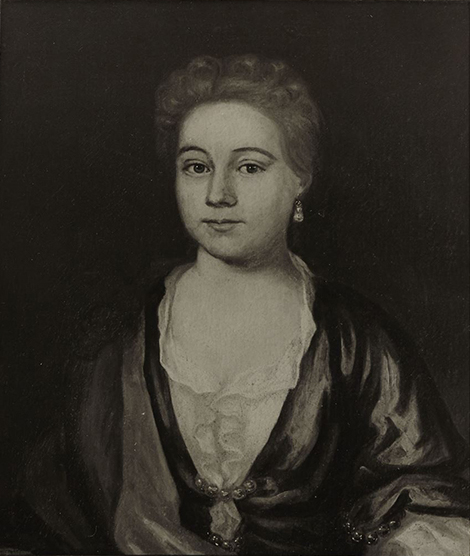
Elizabeth Gwynne Tayloe

== Personal life ==
He married Elizabeth (Gwynn) Lyde (1692–1734), widow of Stephen Lyde, daughter of Major David Gwynn of Gwynnfield, Essex County, and Katherine Griffin. They resided at 'The Old House' in Richmond County, 2 miles from Mount Airy. The couple had four children: William Tayloe (1716–1726), who died at age 9, twins named John and Elizabeth (born 28 May 1721), who later married John Wormeley, and a daughter named Ann Corbin Tayloe, born 25 August 1723, who later married Mann Page II, and bore Mann Page, and was stepmother to John Page (Virginia politician).

== Death and legacy ==
After Tayloe died, his son John Tayloe II and his first cousin Colonel Thomas Lee, of Stratford Hall, became executors of his estate, and filed inventories which survived. John II inherited Tayloe's Quarter, what was to become Mount Airy, as well as 12,846 acres in Prince William County, all his other estates (most of which were entailed) and all of his slaves and other property not bequeathed to his wife or others (together with the reversion of what was left her). Tayloe's will gave his widow the use of the plantation where they had lived, 1200 acres; a large number of slaves, a chariot and six horses, plate and furniture, 1000 pounds sterling, and one-fourth of his stock of horses and cattle, and also specifically stated that these bequests would not bar her from receiving her dower. To each of his two daughters, Tayloe gave 2000 pounds sterling from his own estate and 500 pounds a piece in currency money, which had been left them by their grandmother, Mrs. Gwyn. Several friends also received handsome legacies, and Lunenburg parish received a bequest of 300 pounds of currency money of Virginia, 10 cows and a bull. The money was to be expended in repairs and necessary improvements to the glebe, and in clothing the naked and feeding the poor of the parish. Tayloe also directed that 6 slaves should be bought and placed on the glebe to work for the minister, and with this bequest made a provision that if these negroes were ever treated cruelly by the minister, they should be taken from him, and worked, under the orders of the vestry, for the benefit of the parish.

The inventory of his estate shows that on his plantations in Richmond, Essex, King George, Stafford and Prince William counties, Virginia, and in Maryland, he owned 279 slaves. The apartments in his house, the "Old House" (which preceded Mt. Airy), were "the counting-house," "planter's hall", "the passage", "the green room", "the dining room" in which were a set of Reuben's Gallery of Lunenburg, the "back passage", "Mrs. Tayloe's chamber", the "inner room", the "room under Mrs. Tayloe's", "the great chamber", "Mr. Fauntleroy's room", another "passage", "the room over the green room" and "Slater's closet" which was probably the butler's pantry, as it contained plate valued at 160 pounds sterling. The inventory included a coach with harness for four horses and a chariot with harness for six. The total value of the personal estate in VA was 10,035.10.10 pounds sterling. The personal estate in Maryland, including 40 slaves and the equipment of a large plantation, was not appraised.
