= Bristol Iron Works =

Coordinates: 38°10.949′N 77°2.61′W

The Bristol Iron Works, near to the J-64 Virginia Historical Marker on Route 3 below Rollins Fork, was located along the Rappahannock River across from Horse Head Point. The works were overseen by John King and Company from Bristol, England and established in 1721 by John Lomax, John Tayloe I, and associates for the purposes of mining, smelting and trading. The iron works were in operation in 1729 and later.

Colonel William Underwood erected the first mill on what is today known as Bristol Creek or Bristol Mine Run, which divides present-day King George County from Westmoreland County, sometime between 1658 when the land was patented to him, and 1662-3, when he died. The Foxhall’s Mill property was owned in 1670 by Major William Underwood. Over the next sixty years the mill was renamed a number of times.
