= Freedman's Bank Building =

Building in Washington, D.C.

- U.S. National Historic Landmark District – Contributing property
- U.S. Historic district – Contributing property
- D.C. Inventory of Historic Sites
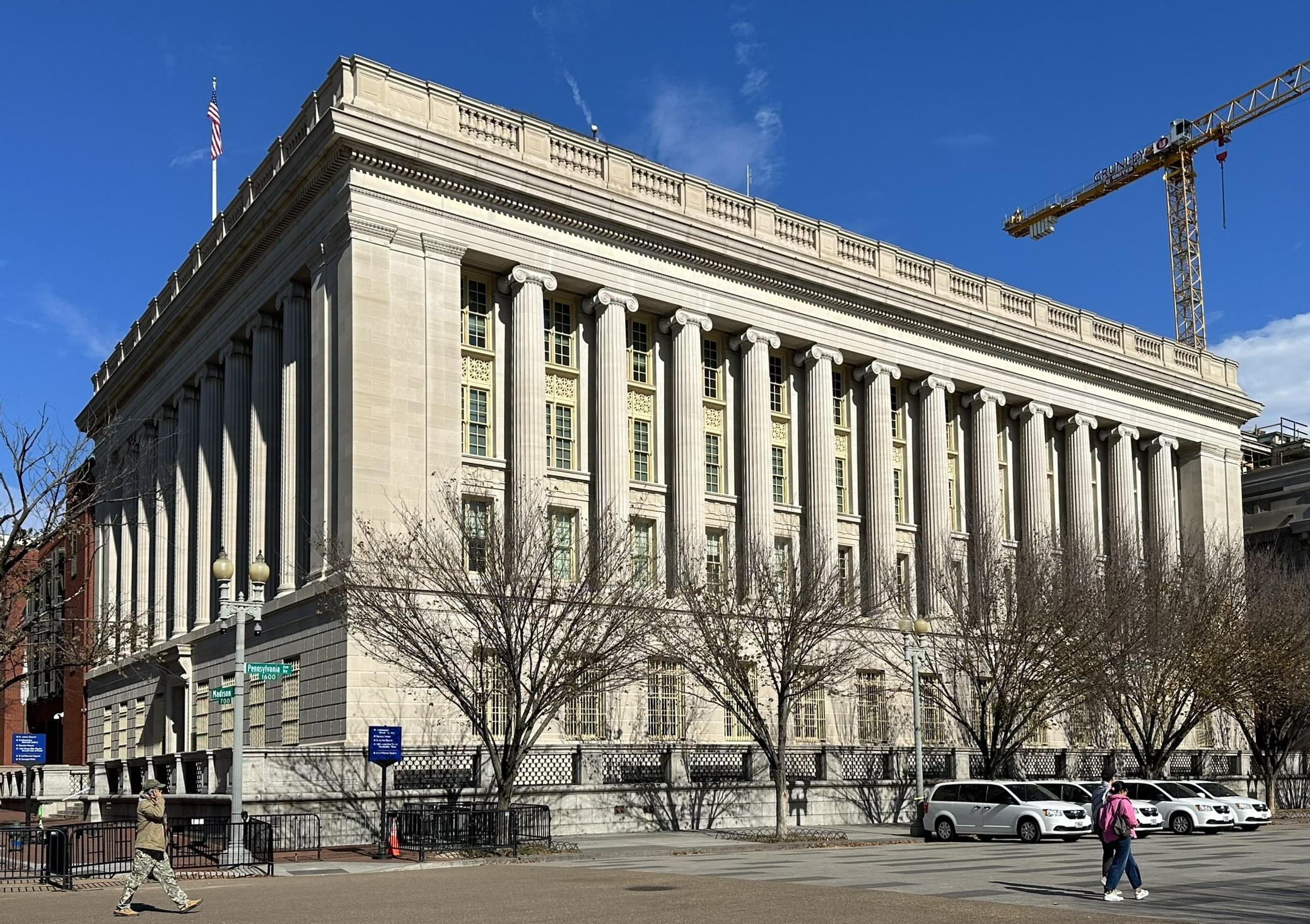
- Freedman's Bank Building as viewed from Pennsylvania Avenue
- Interactive map showing the location for Freedman Bank’s Building
- Location: 701 Madison Place NW Washington, D.C.
- Coordinates: 38°53′56.8″N 77°2′5.3″W
- Built: 1919
- Architect: Cass Gilbert
- Architectural style: Beaux-Arts
- Part of: Lafayette Square Historic District (ID70000833); Financial Historic District (ID100000540)

Significant dates
- Designated NHLDCP: August 29, 1970
- Designated CP: January 12, 2017
- Designated DCIHS: November 8, 1964

The Freedman's Bank Building, previously known as the Treasury Annex, is a historic office building located on the corner of Madison Place and Pennsylvania Avenue NW in Washington, D.C. It sits on the east side of Lafayette Square, a public park on the north side of the White House, and across from the Treasury Building. The adjoining properties include the Howard T. Markey National Courts Building to the north and the former Riggs National Bank to the east.

The current building is the third constructed on the site. The first, a house built in 1831, was later seized by the federal government during the Civil War. It was demolished and replaced with the elaborately decorated headquarters of Freedman's Savings Bank, established by Congress in 1865 for recently emancipated enslaved people and freedmen. Despite the bank's initial success, the combination of mismanagement, fraud, and the Panic of 1873 resulted in the bank's failure and closure in 1874. Over 60,000 African Americans collectively lost the equivalent of $75 million. This caused a distrust of the government and banks for many generations.

The third and present building to be constructed on the site was the Treasury Annex, designed by Cass Gilbert in the Beaux-Arts style and completed in 1919. It was the first large building planned as part of a massive redevelopment of Lafayette Square. The McMillan Plan, which called for the demolition of all buildings on Madison Place and Jackson Place, was only partially completed in the Lafayette Square area. The other completed building, the U.S. Chamber of Commerce Building, was also designed by Gilbert.

The initial plan of eventually expanding the Treasury Annex to H Street NW never happened due to several factors. The construction of Federal Triangle, the work of early historic preservationists, and assistance from President John F. Kennedy and First Lady Jacqueline Kennedy meant several of the historic buildings on Madison Place were never demolished, and the Annex was never expanded. The Annex was renamed the Freedman's Bank Building in 2016 to mark the importance of the site's history.

The Freedman's Bank Building is a contributing property to the Lafayette Square Historic District, a National Historic Landmark, and the Financial Historic District. It is also listed on the District of Columbia Inventory of Historic Sites. The Office of Foreign Assets Control, the Treasury Library, and the main branch of the Treasury Department Federal Credit Union are housed in the building.

== History ==
=== Previous site history ===
Present-day Lafayette Square, a public park sited just north of the White House in Washington, D.C., was initially planned by Pierre Charles L'Enfant as part of President's Park. President Thomas Jefferson later divided President's Park, with Lafayette Square becoming a separate park area north of the White House and The Ellipse south of the White House. During the 19th century, elegant houses built for prominent individuals were constructed along the western, northern, and eastern sides of Lafayette Square.

Soon after politician Richard Cutts and his wife, Anna, built their house on the northeast corner of the square, the one-block street Madison Place was created in the 1820s to link Pennsylvania Avenue NW with H Street NW. On the corner of Madison Place and Pennsylvania Avenue, Dr. James Gunnell built a five-story house in 1831 that was later rented to government employees. The house was seized by the federal government during the Civil War for military use.

==== Freedman's Savings Bank ====
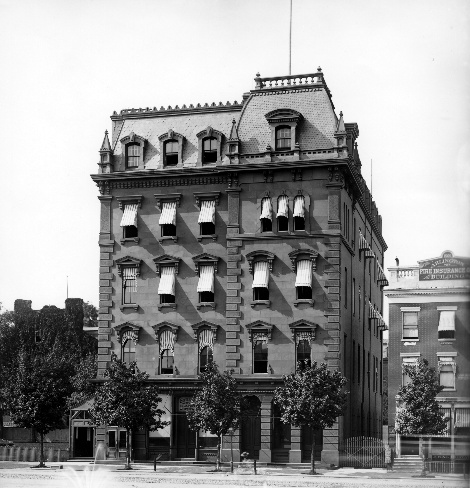
The building that once housed Freedman's Savings Bank was constructed in 1869 and demolished in 1899.

Real estate prices increased considerably after the Civil War, and some houses on the square were converted to office space or rental properties. After the war, Gunnell's house was demolished and replaced with the Freedman's Savings Bank, a private corporation established in 1865 by Congress for millions of recently emancipated enslaved people and previously emancipated freedmen to deposit their savings.

Until the building was completed in 1869, the bank's temporary headquarters was located at 19th Street and Pennsylvania Avenue NW. The new building across from the White House and Treasury Building was built for $260,000 and designed by architects Norris Garshom Starkweather and Thomas M. Plowman. It was an elaborately decorated headquarters, with Frederick Douglass describing it as "one of the most costly and splendid buildings of the time." The bank was initially successful, with around 100,000 African Americans using its services.

Land just east of the square facing Pennsylvania Avenue had already become a popular location for financial institutions, owing to the fact the Treasury Building stood across the street. A Second Bank of the United States branch and adjacent cashier's house built on the northwest corner of 15th Street and Pennsylvania Avenue were later demolished and replaced with the Riggs National Bank and American Security and Trust Company Building.

The combination of mismanagement and fraud with the Panic of 1873 resulted in the failure of Freedman's Savings Bank, which had 37 branches in Washington, D.C., and 17 states. When the bank was closed by Congress in June 1874, 61,114 African Americans and African American-owned institutions lost their savings, totaling around $3 million, equivalent to over $75 million in 2022. This resulted in a deep distrust of banks and government institutions by some African Americans that lasted for generations. W. E. B. Du Bois went so far as to say the bank's failure was more damaging to African Americans than an additional ten years of slavery; John Mercer Langston noted, "Perhaps the failure of no institution in the country...has ever wrought larger disappointment and more disastrous results to those interested in its creation."

Deposit insurance did not yet exist in the United States, so only around half of the bank's customers could receive part of their lost funds, which often took decades. The bank building sat empty until it was purchased by the federal government in 1882 and used as office space for the Justice Department and Court of Claims. The building was demolished in 1899, and the lot remained vacant for almost 20 years.

=== Treasury Annex ===
==== Planning and construction ====
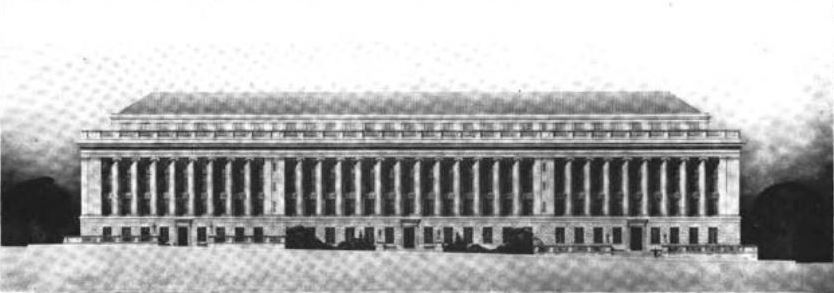
The original design included plans for a later addition that would extend the entire length of Madison Place.

In 1902 the McMillan Plan was created to change the design and layout of the monumental core and park system in Washington, D.C. The plan included radical changes to Lafayette Square, with all of the residential buildings to be demolished and replaced with monumental white marble buildings that would house federal offices. The design for Lafayette Square was inspired by the Place Vendôme in Paris.

At the time, this design was well-received by most people. Still, urban designer Elbert Peets would later note: "Purely as a matter of design, it is surely to be regretted that the residence scale and atmosphere of Lafayette Square cannot be maintained to connect the White House with the residence district of the city. It seems an ideal location of those unofficial White Houses, the national headquarters of clubs and societies - all of red brick, to preserve for the White House its dominance of scale and color."

Despite aspects of the McMillan plan being implemented in other parts of the city, changes to Lafayette Square did not occur until World War I. The Treasury Department needed additional office space, and plans were made to construct the Treasury Annex on the former Freedman's Bank site. The plan was for the first phase of the Annex to be built on the corner of Madison Place and Pennsylvania Avenue, with the remaining portion that would extend along Madison Place all the way to H Street. The building was designed to be enlarged at a later date.

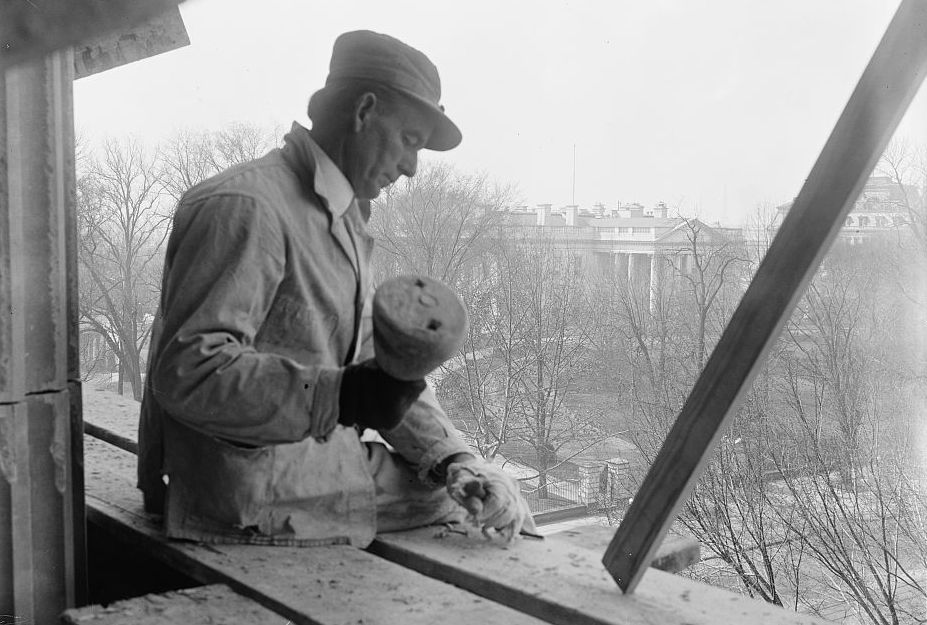
Construction of the Treasury Annex with the White House in the background

On September 27, 1917, an Act of Congress provided funds for the building's construction and allowed the Treasury Secretary to "secure special architectural and expert services." The funds allocated for the new building, along with a tunnel underneath Pennsylvania Avenue connecting to the Treasury Building, was $1,250,000. There was much pressure to design a building worthy of its location across from the Treasury Building. Senator Frank B. Brandegee said if the new building had "no artistic finish at all", it would be a "public calamity" since it would stand across from the "finest example of pure Grecian art."

The architect chosen to design the Treasury Annex was Cass Gilbert (1859–1934), a friend of Treasury Secretary William Gibbs McAdoo. Gilbert's selection was praised by the American Institute of Architects (AIA). After consulting with the United States Commission of Fine Arts, the final design for the Beaux-Arts building included several requirements: a setback of 10 feet (3 m) from the property line facing Pennsylvania Avenue, 100,000 square feet (9,290 sq m) of office space, and be no more than 85 feet (25.9 m) high. The plans were sent to the Treasury Department on January 14, 1918, and approved four days later. Construction began in April of that same year, and the building was completed in April 1919.

The Treasury Annex was one of only two components of the McMillan Plan completed in the Lafayette Square area. The second was the U.S. Chamber of Commerce Building, also designed by Cass, that was built in 1925 on the northern side of H Street across from the Decatur House. Like the Annex, the Commerce Building was designed in the Beaux-Arts style. The Chamber of Commerce built the headquarters there, thinking the rest of Lafayette Square would be redeveloped.

==== Changes to Lafayette Square ====
Expanding the Treasury Annex to H Street was still planned until the 1930s, when the federal government began constructing the massive Federal Triangle office complex southeast of the White House. The federal government purchased all of the buildings facing Lafayette Square after World War II, some of which were commercial buildings that had replaced houses. The General Services Administration wanted to raze all of these buildings, except the Treasury Annex, and replace them with a new courthouse on Madison Place and an executive office building on Jackson Place. The proposal was criticized by the AIA and the Committee of 100 on the Federal City, a private nonprofit organization that advocates historic preservation be taken into account in city planning.

By the 1950s, historic preservation had become a more popular idea with locals, and with the help of local activists and the Committee of 100, redevelopment plans were delayed. During the presidency of John F. Kennedy, he and First Lady Jacqueline Kennedy were sympathetic to preserving the remaining historic buildings on Lafayette Square. With the assistance of architect John Carl Warnecke, a plan was created to preserve the remaining buildings. More recently constructed buildings were demolished and replaced with buildings like surviving historic houses. The New Executive Office Building was built behind the properties facing Jackson Place, and the Howard T. Markey National Courts Building was built behind the properties facing Madison Place, adjacent to the Treasury Annex. Since then, the same concept has been replicated in numerous designs in Washington, D.C., preserving many historic buildings.

==== Historic landmark and renaming ====
"The Story of the Freedman's Bank" by the US Department of the Treasury

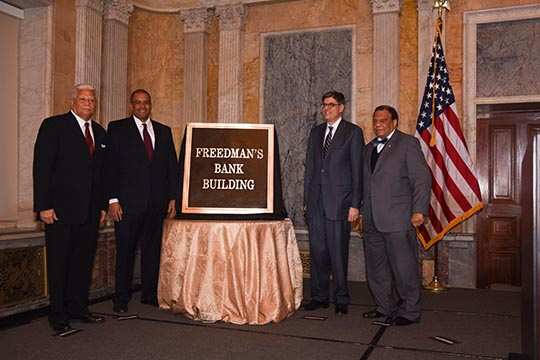
The renaming ceremony in 2016

On November 8, 1964, the Treasury Annex was added to the newly created District of Columbia Inventory of Historic Sites. On August 29, 1970, the building was designated a contributing property to the Lafayette Square Historic District, a National Historic Landmark. Other prominent buildings in the historic district include the Eisenhower Executive Office Building, the Blair House, the Hay–Adams Hotel, the Renwick Gallery, and St. John's Episcopal Church. When the Fifteenth Street Financial Historic District was added to the National Register of Historic Places in 2006, the Treasury Annex was omitted. The historic district's boundary was later increased on January 12, 2017, and the Annex was designated a contributing property in the renamed Financial Historic District.

To mark the 150th anniversary of the Freedman's Savings Bank's charter, officials from the Federal Reserve Bank of Cleveland held a series of panels in 2015. John Hope Bryant of Operation HOPE, Inc. asked Treasury Department officials to rename the Treasury Annex as a way to recognize the site's historical significance to African Americans. That December Treasury Secretary Jack Lew announced the building would be renamed the following month: "Naming the Freedman's Bank Building recognizes an institution that symbolized a new future for African-Americans. The legacy of Freedman's Bank also serves as a reminder that we must continue striving for greater financial inclusion for all Americans – particularly those in underserved and minority communities – so that they can share in the benefits of our growing economy."

The renaming ceremony occurred on January 7, 2016, with a commemorative plaque on the building's exterior. The ceremony included remarks from Secretary Lew, civil rights activist and politician Andrew Young, and businessman Alden J. McDonald Jr., president of Liberty Bank and Trust. Young stated: "The history of the Freedman's Bank is a significant part of our economic legacy. When we look at the history of the African American integration into America, the one thing that's been most difficult for us is to desegregate the money. To desegregate, to get the right to vote in a democracy, and not have access to capital is to only be halfway free. And we've always known that."

== Usage and design ==
The Freedman's Bank Building houses office space for the Office of Foreign Assets Control, the Treasury Library, and the main branch of the Treasury Department Federal Credit Union. Security for the property and surrounding area in the White House vicinity is provided by the Secret Service.

The building was designed in the Beaux-Arts style, which complements the Treasury Building's neoclassical design and the U.S. Chamber of Commerce Building's Beaux-Arts design, though the latter features more ornate exterior details. The main entrance to the building is located on Madison Place. When it was built, there was a street grade difference of 9 feet (2.7 m) between Pennsylvania Avenue and H Street.

Since the original plan was for the Annex to eventually be expanded north to H Street, the first floor facing Pennsylvania Avenue was built higher. A granite terrace was built along the sides, adding to the setback required by planners. The southern and western faces of the building are made of Indiana limestone. The windows on the first floor feature wrought iron grilles; the third-and-fourth-floor windows display ornamental iron spandrels between them.

There are six floors in the building. The fifth floor is at the same level as the entablature, resulting in the top two floors being obscured from street level by that and a parapet. The basement level includes offices, mechanical rooms, and a tunnel connecting the Treasury Building across the street. It originally included segregated bathrooms for African American cleaning staff.

== See also ==
- List of African-American historic places in Washington, D.C.
- National Register of Historic Places listings in Washington, D.C.
