= Lafayette Square Historic District (Washington, D.C.) =

Historic district in Washington, D.C., United States

- U.S. National Register of Historic Places
- U.S. National Historic Landmark District
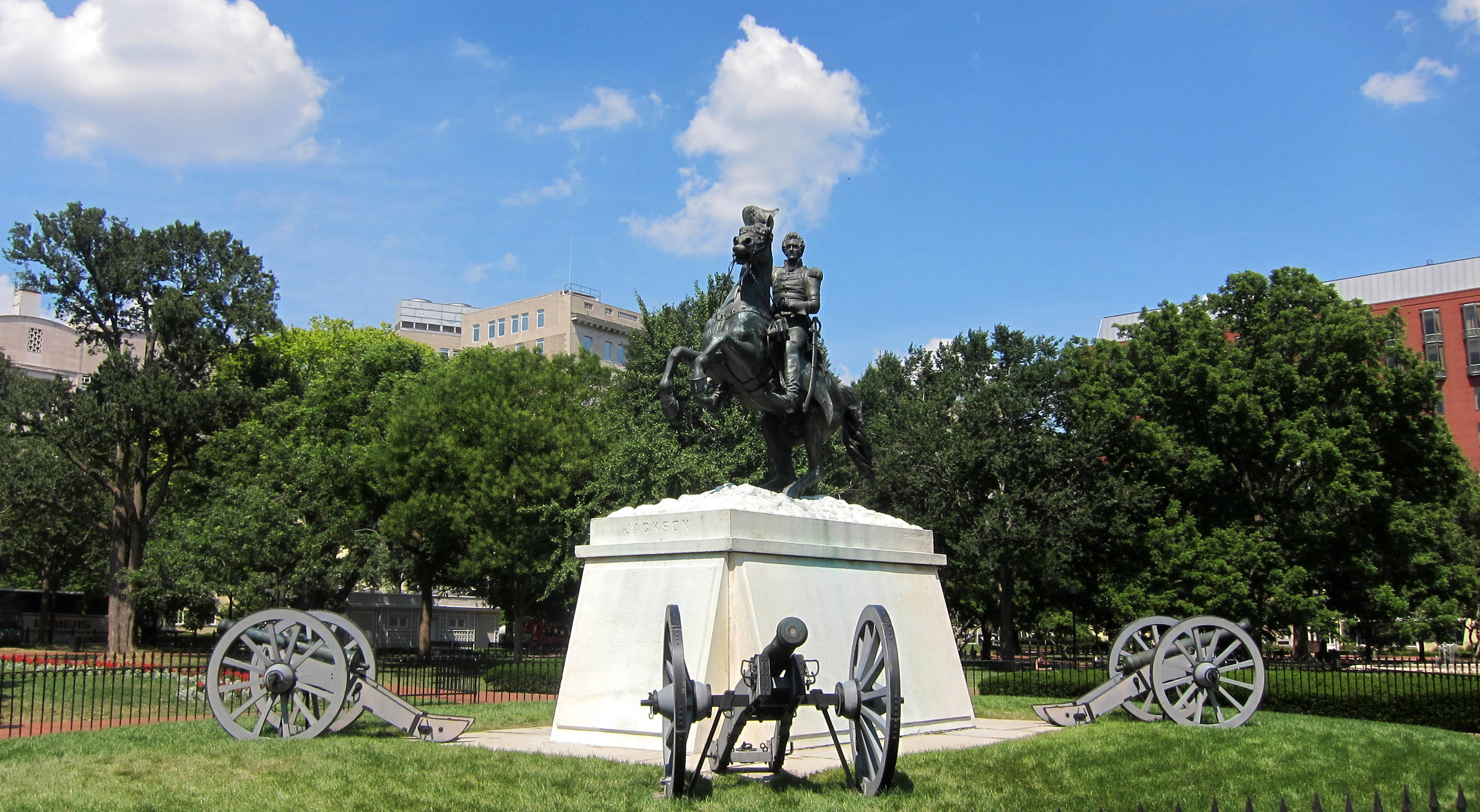
- Equestrian sculpture of Andrew Jackson in Lafayette Square

- Location within the District of Columbia Location within the United States
- Location: President's Park, Washington, D.C.
- Coordinates: 38°53′58.3″N 77°02′11.6″W
- Built: 1851
- Architect: Pierre Charles L'Enfant; Et al.
- Architectural style: Late Victorian, Federal
- NRHP reference No.: 70000833

Significant dates
- Added to NRHP: August 29, 1970
- Designated NHLD: August 29, 1970

The Lafayette Square Historic District is a National Historic Landmark District in Washington, D.C., encompassing a portion of the original L'Enfant Plan for the city's core. It includes the 7-acre (2.8 ha) Lafayette Square portion of President's Park, all of the buildings facing it except the White House, and the buildings flanking the White House to the east and west. The district was designated a National Historic Landmark in 1970.

== Lafayette Square history ==
Washington, D.C. was designated as the site for the United States capital in the 1790 Residence Act, with authority given to President George Washington to ready the capital for the government by 1800. Planned by Pierre Charles L'Enfant as part of the pleasure grounds surrounding the Executive Mansion, this square was originally called "President's Park", which is now the name of the larger National Park Service unit under which it is administered, which also includes the grounds of the White House and The Ellipse. The square was separated from the White House grounds in 1804, when third President Thomas Jefferson had Pennsylvania Avenue cut through east to west. In 1824, it was officially renamed in honor of the Marquis de Lafayette, the Frenchman who fought in the American Revolutionary War (1775-1783).

Lafayette Square has been used as a racetrack, a graveyard, a zoo, a slave market, an encampment for soldiers during the War of 1812, and many political protests and celebrations. Andrew Jackson Downing landscaped Lafayette Square in 1851 in the picturesque style.

== Surrounding buildings ==
Lafayette Square is surrounded by buildings dating back to the early 19th century, and are in a variety of styles. Due to their proximity to the nation's centers of power, many of them have significance of their own, and are independently listed as National Historic Landmarks.

=== West Side ===
The west side of Lafayette Square is Jackson Place. It is lined by a series of townhouses that were built in the mid-to-late 19th century. The two at the southern end are part of the Blair House complex for visiting dignitaries; one of these, the Peter Parker House, is a National Historic Landmark. 734 Jackson Place is also known as the American Peace Society house, and 736 Jackson Place was a temporary residence of 26th President Theodore Roosevelt while the White House underwent renovation in 1902. 748 Jackson Place, at the north end of the block, is called the Decatur House; it is a prominent surviving design of Benjamin Henry Latrobe.

Flanking the White House on the west side is the Eisenhower Executive Office Building, constructed 1871–1888, as the State, War and Navy Department Building, once the world's largest office building.

=== North Side ===
Lafayette Square is flanked on the north by H Street. From west to east, the buildings lining the street are the U.S. Chamber of Commerce Building, the Hay–Adams Hotel, St. John's Episcopal Church, the Ashburton House, and the headquarters of the United States Department of Veterans Affairs.

=== East Side ===
Madison Place lines Lafayette Square to the east. Buildings facing it include the Howard T. Markey National Courts Building, the Benjamin Ogle Tayloe House, the Cutts-Madison House, and the Freedman's Bank Building. Flanking the White House on the east side is the Treasury Building.

=== Navy Yard Urns ===
Two urns reside on the south side of the district, between Jackson Place and Madison Place. They each stand at 5 feet tall by 4 feet wide, and are made of bronze with granite bases. The sides of the urns are decorated with classical female figures. The urns were part of the original park plan as designed by Andrew Jackson Downing in 1852. They may have been designed by Downing, or his assistant Calvert Vaux. The urns were cast in a New York foundry at the orders of George M. Robeson, who was Secretary of the United States Navy at the time. The urns were originally placed on granite bases in the center of two small flower beds to the east and west sides of the Andrew Jackson statue. In 1879, they were fitted with metal pans which allowed them to be used as flower pots. The park was redesigned in 1936, and the urns were moved to their current location.

== See also ==
- List of National Historic Landmarks in Washington, D.C.
- National Register of Historic Places listings in central Washington, D.C.
