= Madison Place =

One-block street in Washington, D.C., U.S.

Coordinates: 38°53′58.6″N 77°2′6.3″W

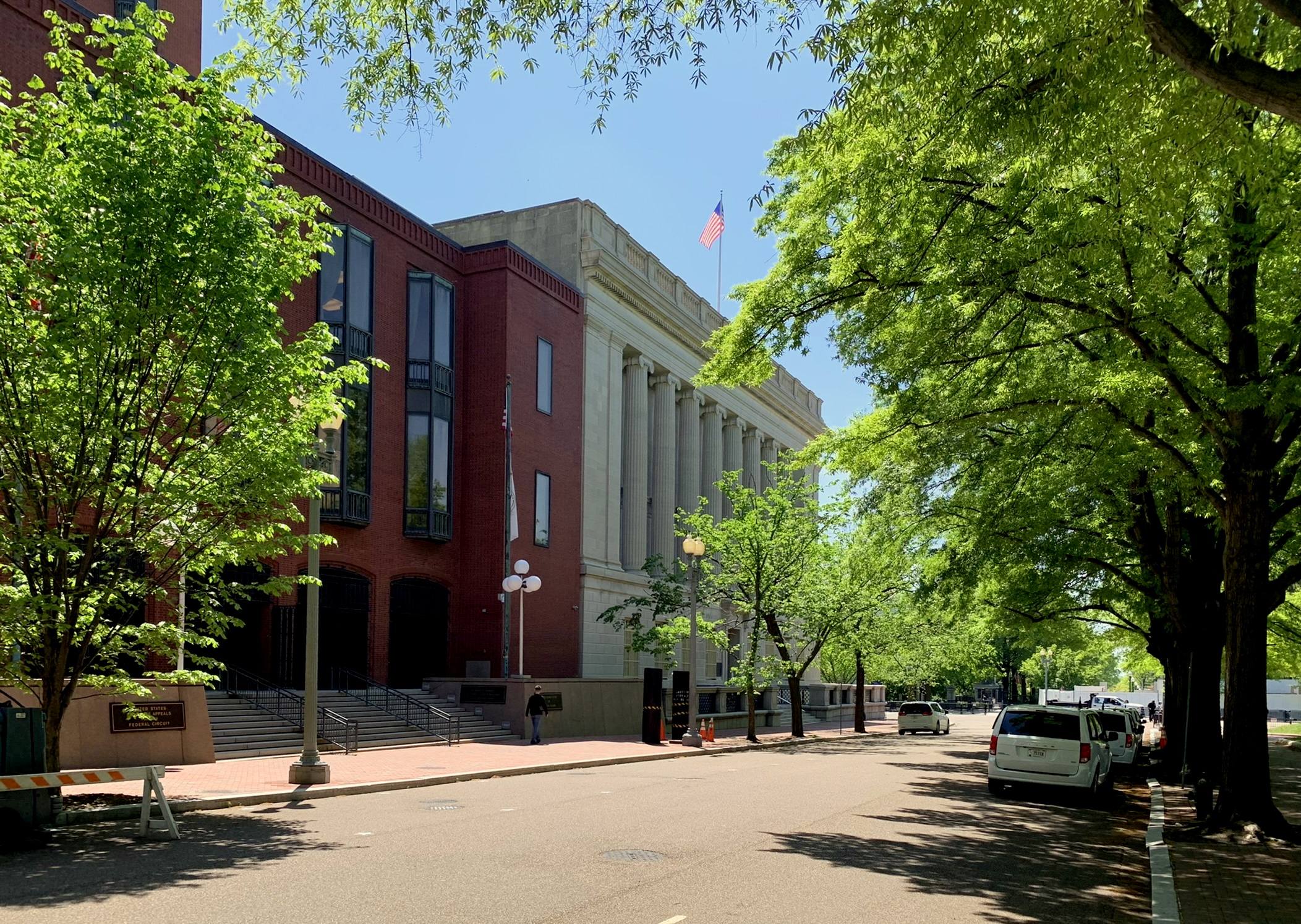
- Facing south on Madison Place towards the Howard T. Markey National Courts Building and Freedman's Bank Building

- Location within the District of Columbia
- Location: Washington, D.C., U.S.
- From: Pennsylvania Avenue
- To: H Street NW

Madison Place is a one-block street located in northwest Washington, D.C., across from the White House. It forms the eastern border of Lafayette Square (the northernmost part of President's Park) between Pennsylvania Avenue and H Street NW. Buildings on Madison Place include the Howard T. Markey National Courts Building, the Benjamin Ogle Tayloe House, the Cutts-Madison House, and the Freedman's Bank Building. The street is part of the Lafayette Square Historic District.
