= Treasury Library =

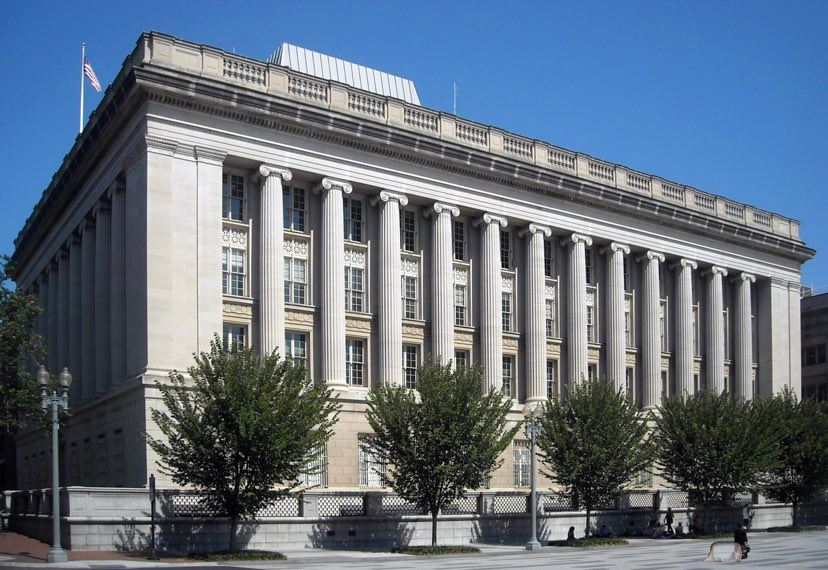
- The Treasury Library is located in the Freedman's Bank Building, previously known as the Treasury Annex.
- 38.89926427537137°N 77.03429342938993°W
- Location: Washington, D.C., United States

Other information
- Website: https://home.treasury.gov/about/history/freedmans-bank-building

The Treasury Library is the library of the United States Department of the Treasury. It is located at Freedman's Bank Building n the corner of Madison Place and Pennsylvania Avenue in Northwest Washington, D.C. in Washington, D.C. The library has been part of the Federal Depository Library Program since 1895. The oldest reference to the library in the records of the treasury dates from 1823.
