= Howard T. Markey National Courts Building =

Courthouse building in Washington, D.C.

Coordinates: 38°53′58.05″N 77°02′5.6″W

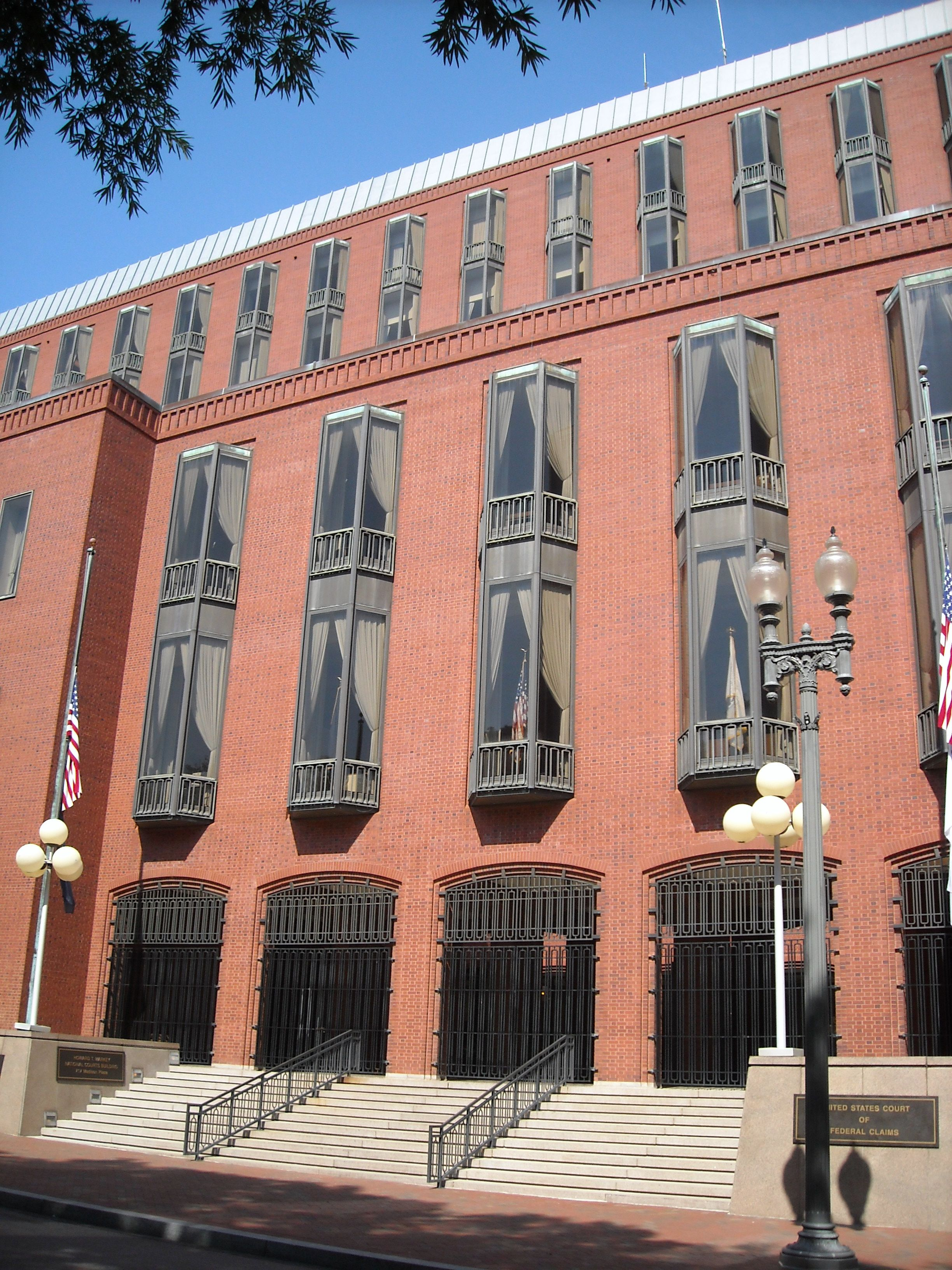
The Howard T. Markey National Courts Building, formerly known as the National Courts Building, located at 717 Madison Place, NW in Lafayette Square, houses the United States Court of Federal Claims and United States Court of Appeals for the Federal Circuit.

The Howard T. Markey National Courts Building (formerly the National Courts Building) is a courthouse in Washington, D.C., which houses the U.S. Court of Appeals for the Federal Circuit and the U.S. Court of Federal Claims. Opened in 1967, it is located at 717 Madison Place NW, east of Lafayette Square and north of the White House, and borders the Freedman's Bank Building to the south. The Benjamin Ogle Tayloe House at 721 Madison Place NW, the former Cosmos Club building at 725 Madison Place NW, and the Cutts-Madison House at 1520 H Street NW are now joined with the Markey building to provide the court's facilities.

== History ==
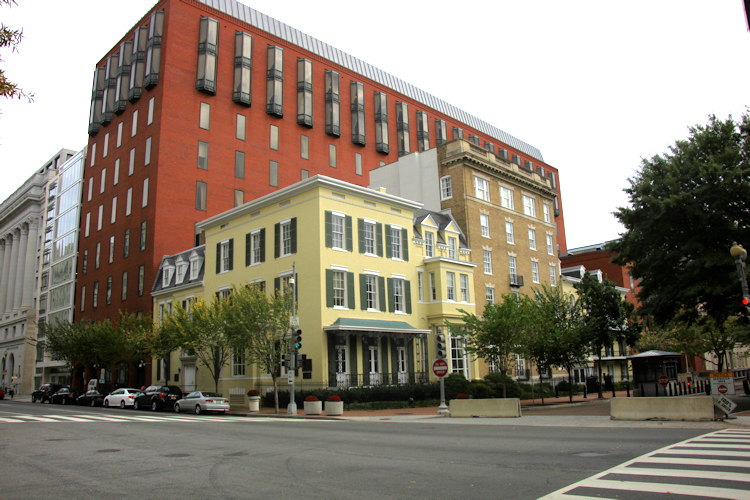
The Cutts–Madison House (corner), with the former Cosmos Club building (in tan) to the right and part of the National Courts building in the rear. These buildings were joined in a scheme to save the earlier historic structure in the 1960s and now serve as a courts complex.

The original plan for the courthouse and an office building for White House staff had called for the historic houses on both sides of Lafayette Square to be razed. First Lady Jacqueline Kennedy, a believer in historic preservation, urged President John F. Kennedy to find an alternative solution. Kennedy tapped architect John Carl Warnecke to come up with a plan to preserve the houses. Warnecke and Jacqueline Kennedy envisioned that the courthouse and the New Executive Office Building, a twin structure to be built on the other side of Lafayette Square, would form a backdrop for the historic houses. The two buildings remain distinctive in their own right.

The Building Committee included Chief Judge John Marvin Jones, Commissioner Marion T. Bennett, and Chief Commissioner Arnold Wilson Cowen. The building was dedicated on September 20, 1967.

The courthouse was initially built for the United States Court of Customs and Patent Appeals and the United States Court of Claims, so when the two courts were abolished and merged to create the Federal Circuit in 1982, they already had a domicile in common.

In 1998, President Bill Clinton signed legislation renaming the National Courts Building after Howard Thomas Markey, the first chief judge of the Federal Circuit Court. The re-dedication celebration was held on October 23, 1998, during a special joint session of the Court of Appeals for the Federal Circuit and the Court of Federal Claims.

== See also ==
- Lafayette Square Historic District (Washington, D.C.)
