= Freedman's Savings Bank =

Private savings bank chartered by the U.S. Congress

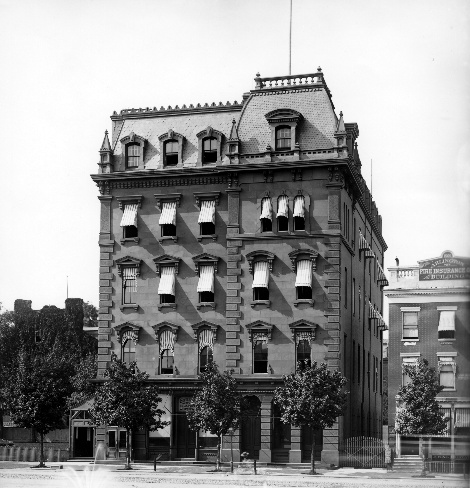
The Freedman's Savings Bank on Pennsylvania Avenue in Washington, D.C.

The Freedman's Saving and Trust Company, known as the Freedman's Savings Bank, was a private savings bank chartered by the U.S. Congress on March 3, 1865, to collect deposits from Black people, especially the formerly enslaved people in the South. The bank opened 37 branches across 17 states and Washington, D.C. within 7 years and collected funds from over 67,000 depositors. At the height of its growth, the Freedman's Savings Bank held assets worth more than $3.7 million in 1872 dollars, which translates to approximately $80 million in 2021.

However, the rapid development of the bank was largely driven by false claims and was coupled with mismanagement and fraud. The bank failed in 1874, weighed down by speculative loans issued by the bank's white officials throughout its existence. Historians believe that the bank's failure not only destroyed the savings of many African Americans, but also their trust in financial institutions.

The site where the bank's headquarters once stood was later occupied by the Treasury Annex. The Annex was renamed the Freedman's Bank Building in 2016.

== Establishment ==
"The Story of the Freedman's Bank" video by the United States Department of the Treasury

At the end of the American Civil War, the poor economic conditions of the formerly enslaved freedmen were aggravated by the economic devastation of the Southern states. The newly freed Blacks had few economic resources or capital and even less exposure to private enterprise. Many soon turned to sharecropping and forced labor in the South. To help alleviate their socio-economic conditions, the Republican-controlled U. S. Congress established the Freedmen's Bureau, passing an act of incorporation and a charter for the Freedman's Saving and Trust Company, which was signed into law by President Abraham Lincoln on March 3, 1865 (13 Stat. 510).

Senator Blanche Bruce of the Select Committee on the Freedman's Savings and Trust Company, himself a former slave, wrote

As its name imports, the institution was designed to perform for a particular class of our people the simple but important functions of a savings bank; its declared purpose being "to receive on deposit such sums of money as may from time to time be offered therefor, by or on behalf of persons heretofore held in slavery in the United States or their descendants, and investing the same in the stocks, bonds, treasury notes, or other securities of the United States."

The founder of the Freedman's Savings Bank, John W. Alvord, was inspired by the success of existing military savings banks. These military banks were created during the Civil War to collect the wages of Black soldiers. General Rufus Saxton established the first one in Beaufort, South Carolina, in 1864. Other examples include a bank in Norfolk, Virginia, established by General Benjamin Butler in late 1864, and a bank in Louisiana created by General Nathaniel Banks.

Many former slaves were liberated by the Union Army and were paid to join the army. Troops earned a little cash from their enrollment and participation, and the Freedman's Bank became the first banking entity to include them. Most accounts held between $5 and $50.

From 1865 to 1868, the expansion of the Freedman's Bank was largely driven by the money collected from Black soldiers. In the bank's first year, in 1865, two of the branches established were created through the transfer of existing local military savings institutions. Many other branch locations were chosen specifically based on the local Black soldier population. Bank officials made efforts to build the bank legitimacy and deposits raising part of the Black soldiers’ wages. For example, many cashiers at branches also worked as military disbursing officers.

== Fraud and other financial misconduct ==
From the Freedman's Savings Bank's creation, there were several deficiencies in its governance and management that contributed to its ultimate collapse.

The bank trustees had little incentive to govern effectively. All fifty original trustees were White and were not required to give "any security for the faithful discharge of their trust." Many trustees had little to no involvement with the bank, some even denying they had agreed to join the board.

The bank's founding charter lacked any penal clauses to hold trustees personally liable for the bank's solvency. It prohibited lending until the amendment of 1870. While two-thirds of the bank's deposits were required to be invested in U.S. government securities, the use of the remaining funds was unrestricted; Osthaus wrote that this provision was "somewhat disquieting to those familiar with the history of savings banks, for they knew that available funds frequently became unavailable".

There is also evidence that the bank's management misled depositors about a supposed government guarantee, interest payments, and the use of the deposit funds. During its initial years, the bank marketed itself widely to attract deposits, distributing bank pamphlets at churches and Freedmen's Bureau schools, advertising in local newspapers, and holding public meetings at churches, beneficial societies, and the bank's branches. Its advertisements often depicted the bank as having the backing and guarantee of the federal government, but as a private corporation it had no guarantee. For example, an article in the Semi-Weekly Louisianan stated: "there is no possibility of loss, for the reason that the government of the United States is responsible for every dollar deposited." The bank promised its depositors 6% interest, but often paid a lower rate.

The bank's management closely linked its affairs to the investment bank Jay Cooke and Company, which invested heavily in railroads. As head of the finance committee of the bank, Henry D. Cooke, Jay Cooke’s brother, deposited a significant share of the cash of the Freedman’s Bank at the First National Bank in Washington, D.C., which was Jay Cooke’s office. This amount at its highest was $500,000, on which the Cooke brothers paid a 5 percent interest, even while the Freedman’s Bank was promising 6 percent to its own depositors. In violation of its charter, the Freedman's Bank invested in the bonds of the Union Pacific and Central Railroads, made as early as 1869.

A series of increasingly speculative investments caused the bank to accumulate bad debt, while the decision to build a new building in Washington, D.C., added to its outlays. On May 2, 1870, the bank was authorized by Congress to make loans backed by real estate, up to half the deposit funds. These loans were to be secured by mortgages that were double the value of the loan.

Another apparently corrupt investment was in loans totalling $50,000 to the Seneca Sandstone Company, owner of the Seneca Quarry, secured by "the company's worthless bonds". The loan was approved by Henry D. Cooke, who sat on the board of the quarry company. Bank officials approved personal loans to themselves and associates of the bank. For instance, loans totaling $224,000 were made to Robert I. Fleming, the contractor for the bank's building in Washington, D.C. Even as the failure of the bank was imminent and depositor withdrawals were refused, a secret loan of $33,366 was made to Juan Boyle by the actuary George L. Stickney on June 30, 1874. Senator Blanche Bruce described the loan thusly:

This loan was made after the bank had formally closed, was made without authority of law by the actuary Mr. Stickney, was made without advising with either the trustees or finance committee, was made by a man required to give a bond by the charter, but who not only refused to execute a bond, but perpetrated many high-handed and arbitrary acts without a bond, and with impunity from either censure or punishment by his superior officers. This was not only an unlawful act, but one impertinently offensive, and made subsequent to the amendatory act of 1874, and subject to the penalties provided therein. Why Mr. Stickney has not been dealt with we are not advised, but he is certainly subject to criminal action for his conduct in this if not in other cases.

== Failure ==
When the Panic of 1873 struck, several railroad projects failed, which undermined the finances of the Freedman's Savings Bank. This led to a series of runs in different branches.

Following the panic, in an attempt to restore confidence in the bank among the African-American community, there was a significant change in the leadership of the bank. Trustees of the bank deposed the founder and president John W. Alvord in March 1874, and elected in favor of Frederick Douglass as president. Of this change in leadership, Walter L. Fleming remarked: "Some, looking for a scapegoat, were anxious that colored officials be in charge when the bank failed as they were sure it would; others thought that a Negro administration would restore the confidence of the depositors and enable the institution to survive until better times."

The bank closed on July 2, 1874, despite the reform attempt. Historians have argued that the failure of the Freedman's Bank and the loss of their savings led to a distrust of all banking institutions for several generations among the Black community.

== Depositors’ losses ==
Just after the collapse, in July 1874, three commissioners were appointed to wind down the bank. They found that the value of assets was lower than registered in the bank books; liquid assets, cash, and government securities amounted to less than 2% of the bank's total liabilities.

Many depositors never received their deposits back. To repay them, the commissioners decided to rely on personal passbooks only, instead of the central bank books. Depositors needed to mail their passbooks to Washington to submit their claim. Many depositors, who had lost faith in the bank, were reluctant to do so. Others faced legal challenges in proving their identities or their relationship to depositors who had died. Some who did receive checks did not cash them, not understanding their use.

The repayments came late, leaving cash-poor depositors stranded. Not until November 1875 did the bank start payouts. The commissioners, even in the face of many special requests from depositors for small immediate payments, instructed cashiers to withhold all money, even for cases of extreme necessity. In response, some depositors who had lost faith in the bank and were in dire need, sought to sell their claims against the bank at a discount. Some even sold their passbooks to shopkeepers in exchange for groceries and other supplies.

On many occasions, steep discounts were enforced on the claims of depositors. For example, in 1881 an account holder at the New Orleans branch settled his $352 deposit for just $28.16. On the first payout announcement, only 49% of eligible depositors requested a payment, and bank statistics showed that these were largely claims from the wealthier depositors. Small account holders collected little to no funds. The delayed payments as well as the limited share of depositors receiving them suggest that, on average, depositors received far less than 62% of their deposits.

== Archives ==
The surviving documentation and papers of the bank archives illuminate the names, whereabouts and other relevant information about the veterans of the 7th Regiment United States Colored Troops and their transactions with the bank. The data is considered historically important in the study of African American history. The bank's records of 480,000 names, estimated to be the largest single repository of lineage-linked African American records, has been indexed by the Church of Jesus Christ of Latter-day Saints. The searchable database is available to amateur and professional genealogists as well as researchers.

== See also ==
- Freedman's Bank Building
- Freedmen's Bureau
