= Treasury Department Federal Credit Union =

Credit union in Washington, D.C.

- Type: Credit union
- Industry: Financial services
- Founded: 1935
- Headquarters: Washington, D.C., United States
- Area served: Employees of the US Treasury Department, Department of Homeland Security, U.S. Courts, United States Securities and Exchange Commission (SEC), as well as persons who live, work (or regularly conduct business), worship, or attend school in, and businesses and other legal entities located in, Washington, D.C.
- Key people: Alfred Scipio, President/CEO
- Products: Savings; checking; consumer loans; mortgages; credit cards; investments
- Total assets: US$185,241,509 (2023)
- Website: tdfcu.org

Treasury Department Federal Credit Union (TDFCU) is a credit union headquartered in Washington, D.C., chartered and regulated under the authority of the National Credit Union Administration (NCUA) of the U.S. federal government.

== History ==
The Treasury Department Federal Credit Union (TDFCU) founded in 1935, is a full service financial institution with a voluntary Board of Directors that is elected by the members. Each member is an owner of the credit union with an equal vote.

== Membership ==
Membership in the Treasury Department Federal Credit Union is available to employees of the US Treasury Department, Department of Homeland Security, U.S. Courts, United States Securities and Exchange Commission(SEC), CDC National Center for Health Statistics, as well as persons who live, work (or regularly conduct business), worship, or attend school in, and businesses and other legal entities located in, Washington, D.C.

In addition, once an eligible member joins, their family members are eligible. Family members include spouse / partner, parents, grandparents, siblings, children (includes adopted, foster, and stepchildren) and grandchildren.

== Services ==
TDFCU offers the typical suite of account services offered by most financial institutions, including savings accounts, checking accounts, IRA accounts, and certificates of deposit. The savings product is named "Share Savings" to reflect the fact that a member's initial savings deposit ($10) literally represents their share of ownership in the credit union. TDFCU also offers members consumer loans, credit cards, vehicle loans, education loans, mortgages and home equity lines of credit.

== Branch locations ==
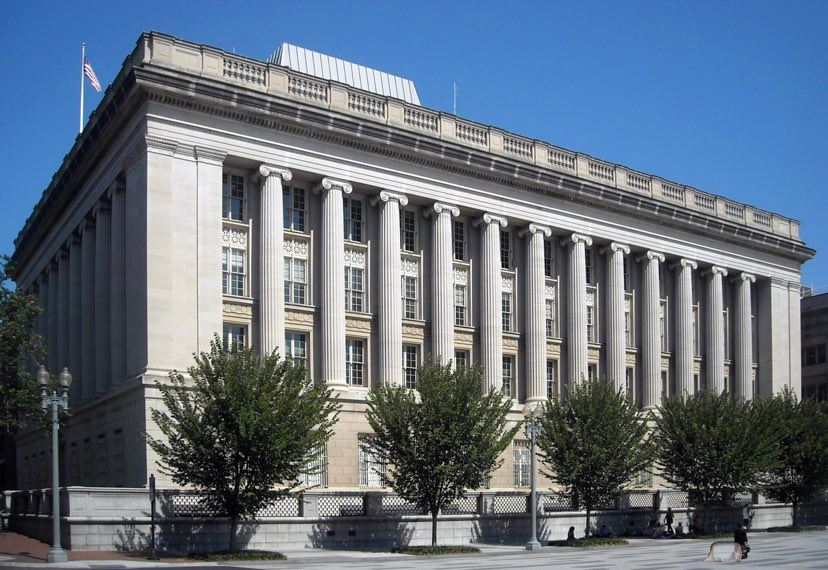
The main branch and headquarters of the TDFCU is located in the Freedman's Bank Building in Washington, D.C.

The Treasury Department Federal Credit Union has six full service branches. Five of the branches are located in the District of Columbia, while the remaining branch is located in Prince George's County, MD.

== Losses ==
TDFCU and several other credit unions were victimized when U.S. Mortgage Corporation sold mortgages that it managed on behalf of the credit union to Fannie Mae and kept the money.

TDFCU lost more than $500,000 in the first nine months of 2008, and some other District of Columbia credit unions also experienced losses.
