= American Peace Society house =

Building in Washington, D.C.

- American Peace Society
- U.S. National Register of Historic Places
- U.S. National Historic Landmark
- U.S. National Historic Landmark District – Contributing property
- D.C. Inventory of Historic Sites
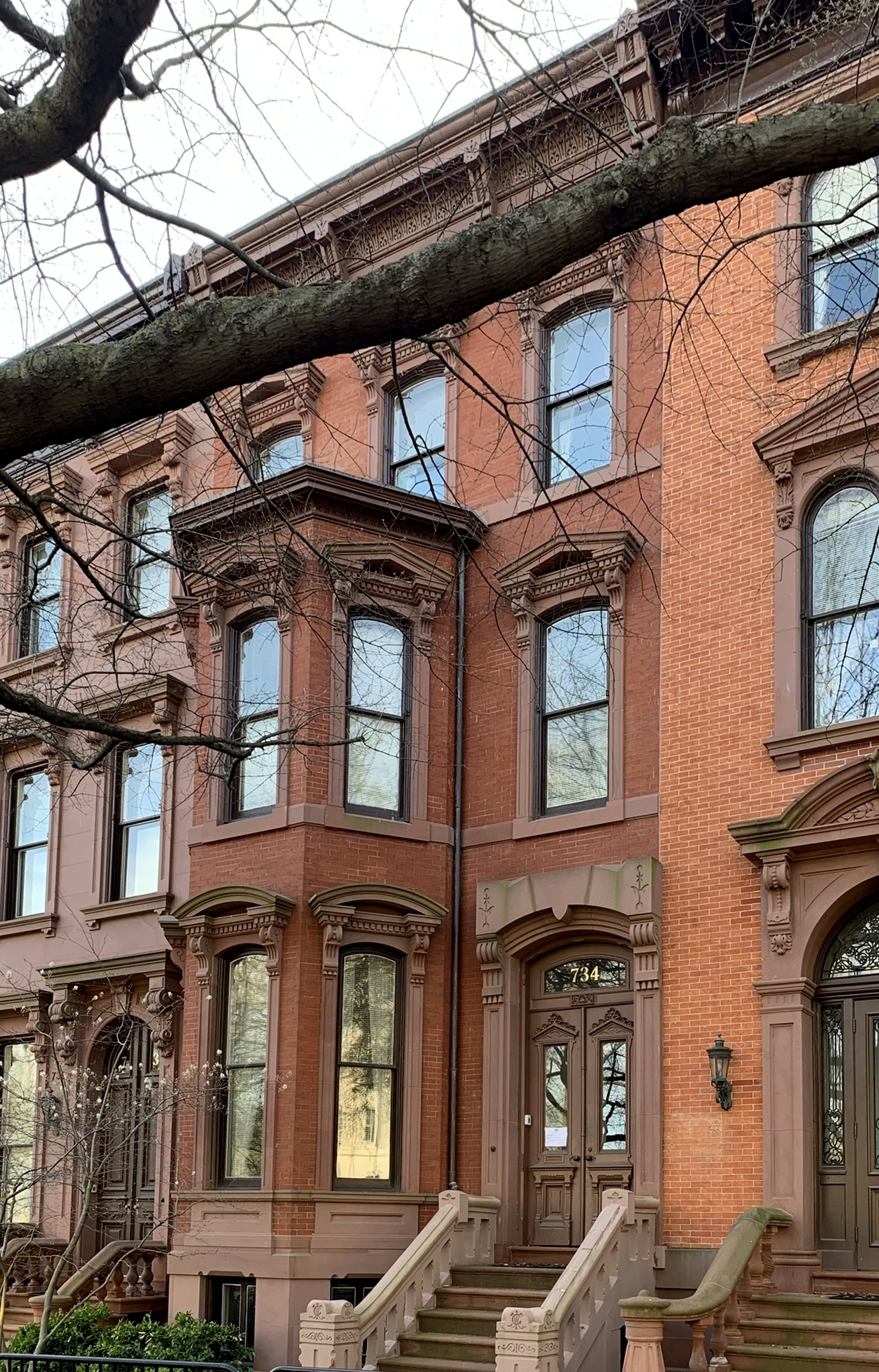
- American Peace Society House in 2022

- Location within Central Washington, D.C. Location within the District of Columbia Location within the United States
- Location: 734 Jackson Pl., NW., Washington, D.C.
- Coordinates: 38°53′58.9″N 77°2′17.3″W
- Built: 1878
- Architectural style: Italianate
- Part of: Lafayette Square Historic District (ID70000833)
- NRHP reference No.: 74002155

Significant dates
- Added to NRHP: September 13, 1974
- Designated NHL: May 30, 1974
- Designated NHLDCP: August 29, 1970
- Designated DCIHS: March 3, 1979

The American Peace Society House, also known as the Glover House, is a historic house at 734 Jackson Place NW, facing Lafayette Square in the heart of Washington, D.C. Built in 1878 for banker and philanthropist Charles Carroll Glover, it is most notable as the national headquarters of the American Peace Society from 1911 to 1948. The Peace Society was one of the first overtly pacifist organizations in the nation, with a history dating to 1815. The house was declared a National Historic Landmark in 1974.

== Description and history ==
The former American Peace Society House stands on the west side of Jackson Place, the street flanking Lafayette Square's west side. It is one of a series of row houses, built of brick with sandstone trim. It is three stories in height, with a two-bay front facade. The entrance is in the right bay, and the left bay has a two-story polygonal projecting bay. Windows are framed by bracketed hoods that are segmental arches on the first floor, and shallow gables on the upper levels. The entrance is set under a bracketed segmented-arch opening with flanking paneled pilasters.

The house was built in 1878, and its first prominent occupant was Charles Carroll Glover, a prominent Washington banker and philanthropist. In 1902 it was briefly occupied by the War College Board. From 1911 to 1947 it served as the headquarters of the American Peace Society. The Society has its origins in a number of local and state peace societies organized in the early decades of the 19th century, the oldest of which, the New York Peace Society, was founded in 1815. In 1828 these disparate groups came together, creating the nation's first organization dedicated to the promotion of international peace.

In the 1970s the house was occupied by the American Revolution Bicentennial Commission, by which time it had been combined by the creation of openings in party walls with one of the adjacent units. The series of rowhouses it is part of now belong to the federal government, and are managed by the General Services Administration.

== See also ==
- List of National Historic Landmarks in Washington, D.C.
- National Register of Historic Places listings in central Washington, D.C.
