= Benjamin Ogle Tayloe House =

Federal-style house in Washington, D.C.

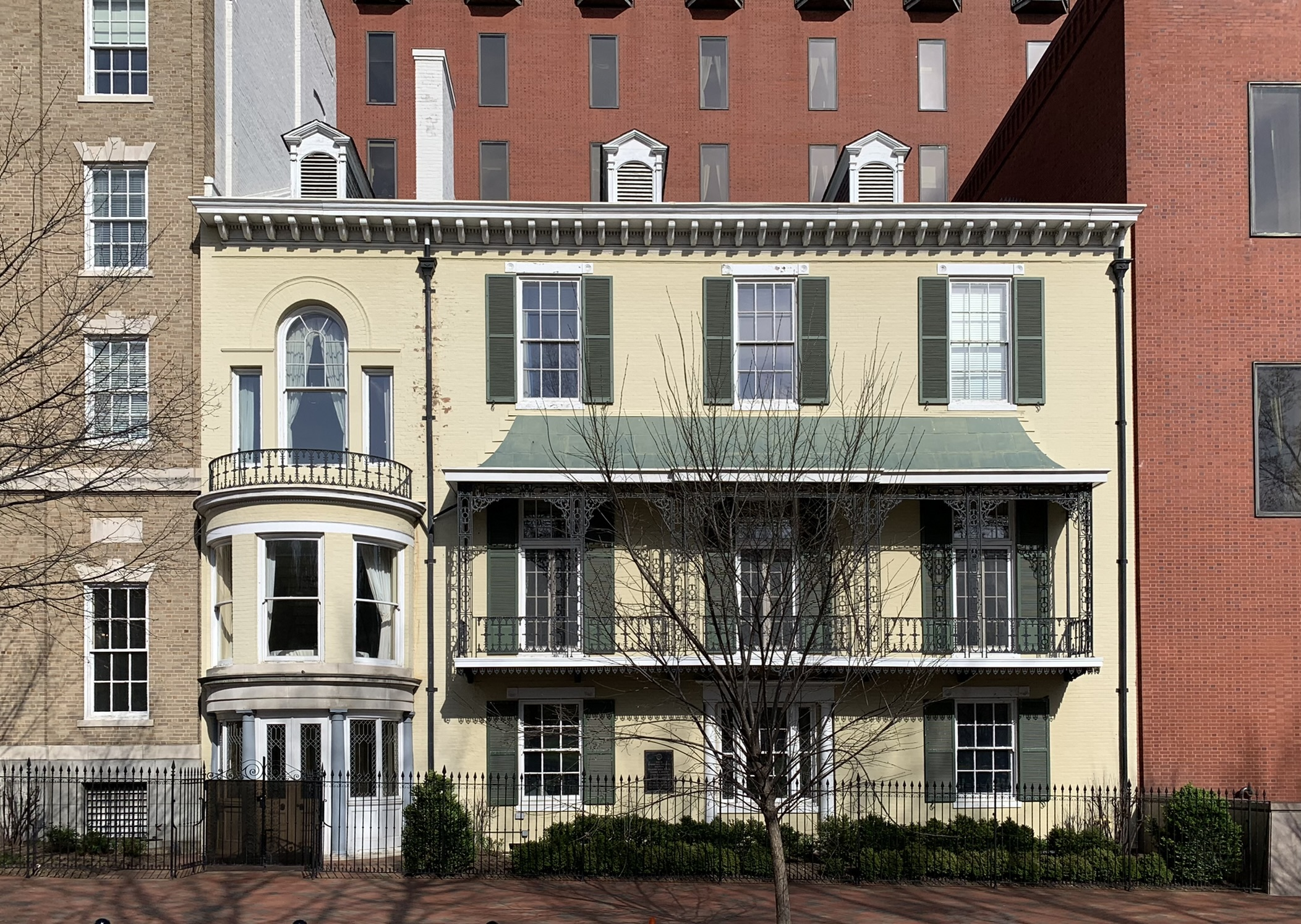
- Benjamin Ogle Tayloe House in 2022

- Location within Central Washington, D.C. Location within the District of Columbia Location within the United States

General information
- Architectural style: Federal
- Location: Washington, D.C., United States
- Coordinates: 38°53′58.9″N 77°2′5.6″W
- Completed: 1828; 198 years ago
- Client: Benjamin Ogle Tayloe
- Benjamin Ogle Tayloe House
- U.S. National Register of Historic Places
- U.S. National Historic Landmark District – Contributing property
- Location within the District of Columbia Location within the United States
- Part of: Lafayette Square Historic District (Washington, D.C.) (ID70000833)
- NRHP reference No.: 100009491

Significant dates
- Added to NRHP: November 2, 2023
- Designated NHLDCP: August 29, 1970

The Benjamin Ogle Tayloe House is a Federal-style house located at 21 Madison Place NW in Washington, D.C., in the United States. The house is on the northeast corner of Madison Place NW and Pennsylvania Avenue NW, directly across the street from the White House and the Treasury Building. Built in 1828 by Benjamin Ogle Tayloe, son of Colonel John Tayloe III (who built the famous Octagon House), the house became a salon for politically powerful people in the federal government.

Phoebe Tayloe inherited the house upon Tayloe's death in 1868. After she died in 1881, more than 200 marble statues, bronze sculptures, fine furniture, and paintings in the house were donated to the Corcoran Gallery of Art. Phoebe Warren Tayloe's niece, Elizabeth H. Price, inherited the house in 1882 and later sold it to Senator Don Cameron of Pennsylvania for $60,000 in 1887. In around 1896, the U.S. Senate passed legislation which would have made the building the official residence of the Vice President of the United States, but the House of Representatives failed to act on the bill. Cameron leased the house to Vice President Garret Hobart from March 1897 until the fall of 1899 and the press and public nicknamed the house the "Historic Corner" and the "Cream White House" for the large number of politically important visitors and meetings held on the premises, with esteemed guests such as the International Boundary Commission and Prince Albert of Belgium. Hobart's failing health led the family to leave the Tayloe House in the fall of 1899 and Cameron then leased the home to Republican Senator Mark Hanna from January 1900 to 1902. Hanna's important political discussions of the moment with William McKinley and Theodore Roosevelt over substantial breakfasts of corned beef hash and pancakes became famous.

The Congressional Union for Woman Suffrage leased the house in the fall of 1915, and made the building its headquarters for two years. The Cosmos Club had considered purchasing the house from the Tayloe family in 1885 and eventually bought it in December 1917. They vacated it in 1952 to move to their new headquarters; the building was purchased by the U.S. government and used for offices. From October 1958 until November 1961, the house was the headquarters of the National Aeronautics and Space Administration (NASA).

Nearly razed to the ground in 1960 along with other buildings on Lafayette Square, successful lobbying and support from the newly elected Kennedy administration in 1961 led to the original proposals to gut the building being dropped. First Lady Jacqueline Kennedy was instrumental in persuading architect John Carl Warnecke, a friend of her husband, to create a design that would incorporate the new buildings with the old, based on the architectural theory of contextualism. The Cutts-Madison House, Cosmos Club building, and Benjamin Ogle Tayloe House were joined, and a courtyard built between them and the National Courts building. The building has remained part of the National Courts Building complex ever since, and is now listed on the National Register of Historic Places.

== Construction ==
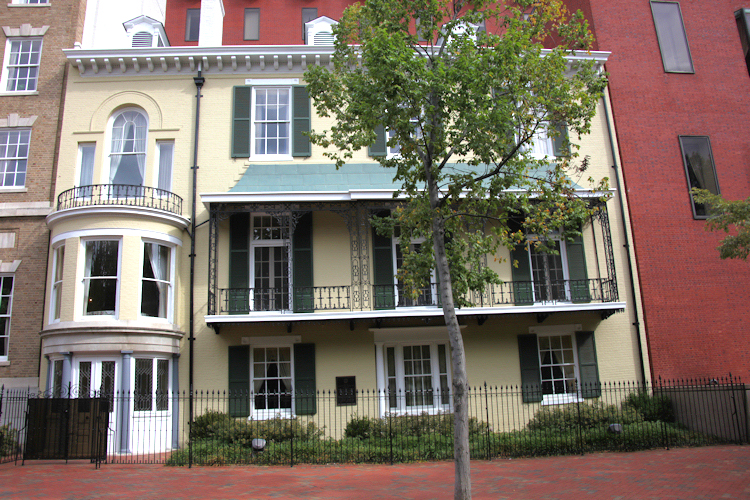
Front view

Benjamin Ogle Tayloe married Julia Maria Dickinson on November 8, 1824. Although Tayloe preferred to live at Windsor, his estate in King George County, Virginia, his wife asked that they move into the city, where she was more comfortable. The house was constructed on Lots 10 and 11 in Square 221. At the time of the building's construction in 1828, the expanse of the city from 15th Street NW (one block east of the home) to 17th Street NW from the White House north to H Street NW was a flat field bare of trees and shrubs.

As originally built, the Federal-style house had three stories. The completed house had four or five parlors. It was built of unpainted, cream-colored brick. The entrance was level with the ground, with an oriel window above it on the second floor and a Palladian window on the third floor above that. An oval portico protected visitors arriving at the front doors.

== Tayloe years ==
The house was completed in 1828, but not immediately occupied. Tayloe had a strong political disagreement with the newly elected President, Andrew Jackson, and refused to move into the home. Tayloe leased the building to Thomas Swann, Sr., a lawyer (and the father of Thomas Swann, Jr., who became Governor of Maryland in 1866). Swann vacated the home in November 1829, at which time Tayloe and his wife occupied it. The house was an important social gathering place for important Washingtonians in the four decades following its construction. In 1829, when Henry Clay left the office of Secretary of State, much of the furniture in his home was acquired by the Tayloes and used to decorate their home. Tayloe House was the last house in Washington visited by President William Henry Harrison before his death in 1841.

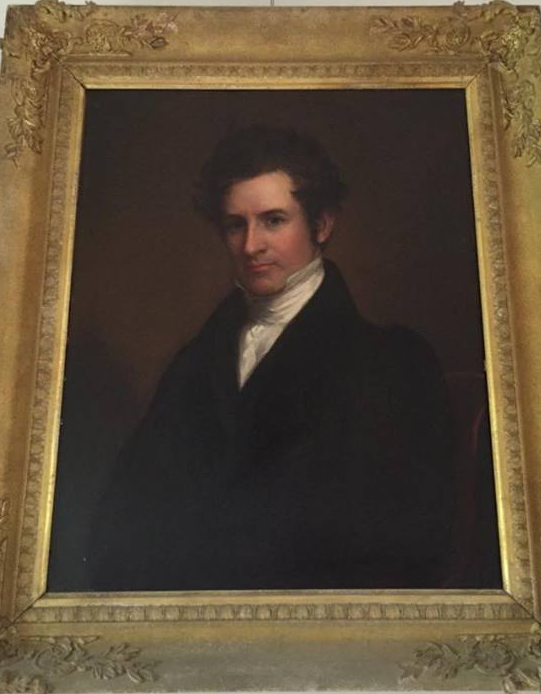
Benjamin Ogle Tayloe by Thomas Sully

Julia Tayloe died on July 4, 1846. Tayloe married Phoebe Warren on April 17, 1849.

The House was the scene of a murder in 1859. Philip Barton Key II was the son of Francis Scott Key and the nephew of Chief Justice Roger B. Taney. In the spring of 1858, Key began having an affair with Teresa Bagioli Sickles, the wife of his friend Daniel Sickles. On February 26, 1859, Sickles learned of the affair. The following day, he saw Key in Lafayette Square signalling to his wife. Sickles rushed out into the park, drew a single pistol, and shot the unarmed Key three times while the other man pleaded for his life. Key was taken into the nearby Tayloe House and died moments later. Key's spirit, eyewitnesses and authors claim, now haunts Lafayette Square and can be seen on dark nights near the spot where he was shot.

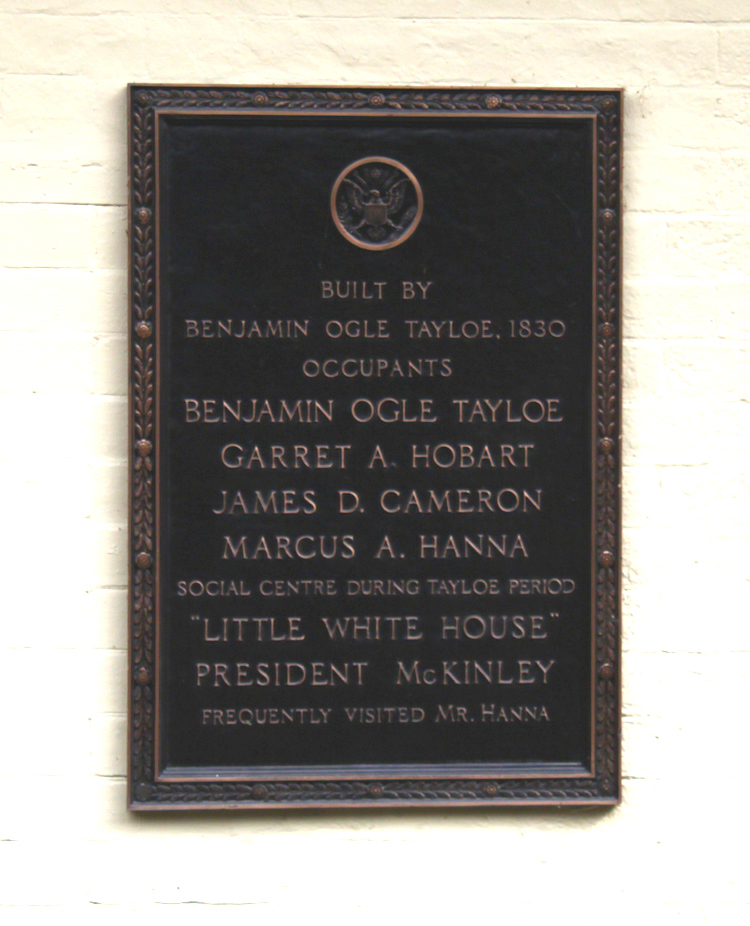
Plaque

The Tayloe house became a noted meeting place for many of the leading political figures of early 19th-century American politics. Tayloe was one of the most influential and active members of the Whig Party in the District of Columbia. Among the many frequent visitors to the house were Chief Justice John Marshall, Senator and Secretary of State Henry Clay, Senator and Secretary of State Daniel Webster, Vice President and Secretary of State John C. Calhoun, Senator Henry Clay, Senator and Secretary of State Lewis Cass, Secretary of State Edward Livingston, Speaker of the House and Senator Robert Charles Winthrop, General Winfield Scott, Senator and Secretary of State Edward Everett, Senator and Secretary of State William H. Seward, Associate Justice Joseph Story, and many others. Presidents John Quincy Adams, Martin Van Buren, William Henry Harrison, Zachary Taylor, and Millard Fillmore also were frequent guests. Anthony Trollope spent much of his free time being entertained by the Tayloes at their home during his visit to Washington, D.C., in the winter of 1862.

Benjamin Ogle Tayloe died on February 28, 1868, and Phoebe Tayloe inherited the house. After she died in 1881, more than 200 marble statues, bronze sculptures, items of fine furniture, and paintings in the house were donated to the Corcoran Gallery of Art. Phoebe Warren Tayloe's niece, Elizabeth H. Price, inherited the house in 1882.

In April 1885, the Cosmos Club considered purchasing the house from the Tayloe family. The influential club already owned most of the block north of the Tayloe House, and was expanding rapidly. It valued the home at $60,000 and the furnishings at an additional $5,000. The Cosmos Club declined to buy the home after an investigation found that the cost of upgrading the Tayloe property for its use would be too costly.

== Cameron years ==
Senator Don Cameron of Pennsylvania purchased the Benjamin Ogle Tayloe House for $60,000 in 1887, and resided there for a time. Cameron expanded the home significantly, almost entirely rebuilding its interior. After the renovation, the front entrance opened onto a square entrance hall. A fireplace adorned the hall. Large rooms on either side of the entrance hall were used as office space. A broad staircase led from the entrance hall up to the second floor, where there were four large rooms. The rooms opened on to one another, permitting the second floor to be opened up into something approaching a single large ballroom. The windows on the second floor reached to the floor. An iron veranda ran around the entire second floor. The home contained a total of 30 rooms after the renovation. Cameron did not, however, renovate the exterior, which remained much the same as it always had. Henry Adams was a frequent guest of the Camerons, playing often with their daughter Martha to alleviate his bouts of depression.

About 1896, the U.S. Senate passed legislation which would have made the building the official residence of the Vice President of the United States, but the House of Representatives failed to act on the bill.

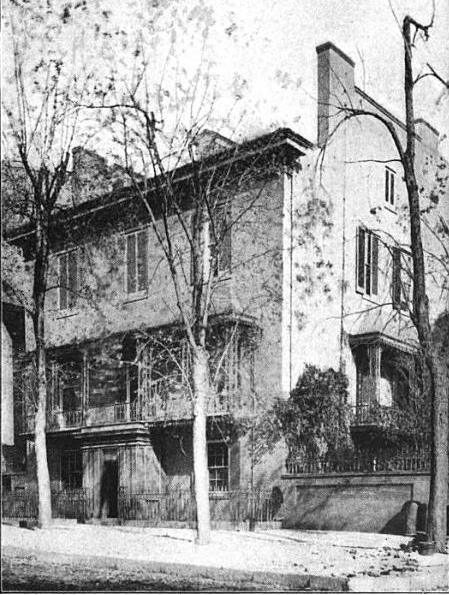
The Tayloe House in 1886, the year before Sen. Don Cameron purchased it

Cameron leased the house to Vice President Garret Hobart from March 1897 until the fall of 1899. No other Vice President had ever lived so close to the White House, and this close proximity helped boost Hobart's access to and influence with the President so much that he was called "Assistant President" and is now considered one of the most powerful Vice Presidents in U.S. history. On several occasions Hobart entertained the entire U.S. Senate at the house, as well as President William McKinley. The International Boundary Commission (which established much of the water and land boundary between the U.S. and Canada) dined in the house at a formal dinner hosted by Hobart, as did Prince Albert of Belgium. The press and public nicknamed the house the "Historic Corner" and the "Cream White House" (a reference to the color of its brickwork) for the large number of politically important visitors and meetings held on the premises during Hobart's tenure there. Hobart's failing health led the family to leave the Tayloe House in the fall of 1899 and return to New Jersey (where Hobart died on November 21).

Cameron then leased the home to Senator Mark Hanna from January 1900 to 1902. Hanna developed his plans for the re-election of President McKinley while resident in the house, plans which gave rise to the first "big money" presidential election in U.S. history. The home was also host to Hanna's famous large breakfasts of corned beef hash and pancakes, over which the most important political decisions of the moment would be made. These meals were so politically important that President Theodore Roosevelt breakfasted with Hanna every Sunday. McKinley and other politically powerful people visited the home so much that it became known as the "Little White House." It was at just such a breakfast on March 10, 1902, that J. P. Morgan asked Senator Hanna whether the United States government had any intention of filing an antitrust lawsuit against the recently formed Northern Securities Company. Hanna said the government would not file suit against the trust. When the government filed suit hours later, Morgan accused Hanna of betraying him, and Hanna accused Roosevelt of betraying him. Hanna died in office on February 15, 1904.

The Congressional Union for Woman Suffrage leased the house in the fall of 1915, and made the building its headquarters for two years. The group rented the house in order to emphasize their importance in the fight for women's suffrage.

== Cosmos Club and federal government ownership ==
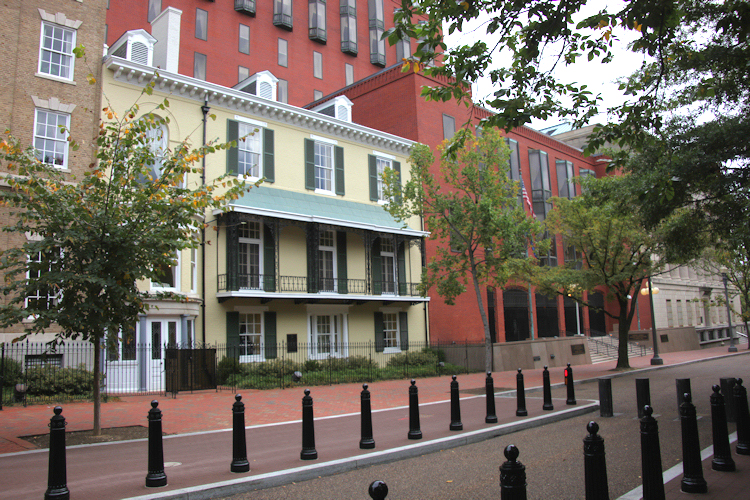
The Tayloe House with the Markey National Courts Building to the right and background

The Cosmos Club finally purchased the house on December 1, 1917. It used the home as its women's annex, and converted the stables into a meeting hall.

The Cosmos Club vacated the Tayloe House in 1952 to move to new headquarters in the Townsend Mansion at 2121 Massachusetts Avenue NW, at which time the building was purchased by the U.S. government and used for offices. From October 1958 until November 1961, the headquarters of the National Aeronautics and Space Administration (NASA) were in the Tayloe House. T. Keith Glennan, the first Administrator of NASA, also had his office in the structure.

In 1960, the Tayloe House was nearly razed. The impetus for tearing down nearly all the historic structures on Lafayette Square began 60 years before. In 1900, the United States Congress passed a resolution establishing the U.S. Senate Park Commission (also known as the "McMillan Commission" because it was chaired by Michigan's Republican Senator James McMillan). The Park Commission's charge was to reconcile competing visions for the development of Washington, D.C., and in particular the National Mall and adjacent areas. The Park Commission's proposals, which came to be known as the "McMillan Plan," proposed that all the buildings around Lafayette Square be razed and replaced by tall, Neoclassical buildings clad in white marble for use by executive branch agencies. For a time, it appeared that the Cutts-Madison House would not survive. William Wilson Corcoran's Corcoran House at 1615 H Street NW was torn down in 1922 and replaced with the Neoclassical United States Chamber of Commerce headquarters. The Hay-Adams Houses were razed in 1927 by real estate developer Harry Wardman, and the Hay–Adams Hotel built on the site. At nearby 1616 H Street NW, the Brookings Institution purchased the rear garden from the private owners of the Decatur House and built an eight-story Modernist office building there. Several million dollars were spent in the late 1950s on designs to raze all the buildings on the east side of Lafayette Square and replace them with a white, modernist office building which would house judicial offices.

Opposition to the demolition of the Tayloe House and other buildings on Lafayette Square began forming shortly after the plan to raze the structures was announced. Senators James E. Murray and Wayne Morse, several members of the House of Representatives, and citizens of the District of Columbia lobbied to defeat the legislation authorizing the demolition of the buildings. The American Institute of Architects (AIA) devoted the February 1961 issue of its journal to a "Lament for Lafayette Square." The AIA established a committee to develop plans to save the buildings and adapt the new structures so that they incorporated the style and feel of the older homes.

The newly elected Kennedy administration indicated on February 16, 1961, that it was anxious to retain the existing historic homes on Lafayette Square. In November, the Committee of 100 on the Federal City (an influential group of city leaders) asked President Kennedy to save and restore all the remaining buildings on Lafayette Square. In February 1962, First Lady Jacqueline Kennedy lobbied General Services Administration (GSA) director Bernard L. Boutin to stop the demolition and adopt a different design plan. "The wreckers haven't started yet, and until they do it can be saved," she wrote. Mrs. Kennedy enlisted architect John Carl Warnecke, a friend of her husband's who happened to be in town that weekend, to create a design which would incorporate the new buildings with the old. Warnecke conceived the basic design over that weekend, and worked closely with Mrs. Kennedy over the next few months to formalize the design proposal. The design was presented to the public and the Commission of Fine Arts (which had approval over any plan) in October 1962, and with Mrs. Kennedy's backing the Commission adopted the revised Warnecke design proposal.

Warnecke's design for the square was based on the architectural theory of contextualism. Not only did Warnecke's design build the first modern buildings on Lafayette Square, but they were the first buildings in the city to utilize contextualism as a design philosophy. Warnecke's design for the Markey National Courts Building was to create tall, flat structures in red brick which would serve as relatively unobtrusive backgrounds to the lighter-colored residential homes like the Cutts-Madison House. The Cutts-Madison House, Cosmos Club building, and Benjamin Ogle Tayloe House were joined, and a courtyard built between them and the National Courts Building.

The Tayloe House has remained part of the National Courts building complex ever since.

== See also ==
- The Octagon House, the townhouse built in 1800 by his father John Tayloe II
- Mount Airy, Richmond County, Virginia, the country estate house built in 1762 by Col. John Tayloe II
- Architecture of Washington, D.C.
- National Register of Historic Places listings in central Washington, D.C.

== Bibliography ==
- Adams, Katherine H. and Keene, Michael L. Alice Paul and the American Suffrage Campaign. Urbana, Ill.: University of Illinois Press, 2008.
- "AIA Journal Laments Lafayette Square's End." Washington Post. January 29, 1961.
- Anthony, Carl Sferrazza. As We Remember Her: Jacqueline Kennedy Onassis in the Words of Her Family and Friends. Reprint ed. New York: HarperCollins, 2003.
- Anthony, Kathryn H. Designing for Diversity: Gender, Race, and Ethnicity in the Architectural Profession. Urbana, Ill.: University of Illinois Press, 2001.
- Apkarian-Russell, Pamela. Washington's Haunted Past: Capital Ghosts of America. Charleston, S.C.: The History Press, 2006.
- Barry, David S. "Men and Affairs at Washington." Bay State Monthly. January 1908.
- Baumgartner, Jody C. The American Vice Presidency Reconsidered. Westport, Conn.: Praeger, 2006.
- Bendar, Michael J. L' Enfant's Legacy: Public Open Spaces in Washington, D.C. Baltimore, Md.: Johns Hopkins University Press, 2006.
- Benedetto, Robert; Donovan, Jane; and Du Vall, Kathleen. Historical Dictionary of Washington, D.C. Lanham, Md.: Scarecrow Press, 2003.
- Beschloss, Michael R. Presidential Courage: Brave Leaders and How They Changed America, 1789–1989. New York: Simon & Schuster, 2008.
- Bowers, Claude Gernade. The Party Battles of the Jackson Period. New York: Houghton Mifflin Company, 1922.
- Burstyn, Joan N. Past and Promise: Lives of New Jersey Women. Syracuse, N.Y.: Syracuse University Press, 1997.
- Carrier, Thomas J. Washington D.C.: A Historical Walking Tour. Charleston, S.C.: Arcadia Publishers, 1999.
- Chapin, Elizabeth Moore. American Court Gossip; or, Life at the National Capitol. Marshalltown, Ia.: Chapin & Hartwell Bros., 1887.
- Cohen, Daniel. Civil War Ghosts. New York: Scholastic Inc., 1999.
- Cramer, James P. and Yankopolus, Jennifer Evans. Almanac of Architecture & Design, 2005. Atlanta, Ga.: Greenway Group, 2005.
- Cullen, Jim. Imperfect Presidents: Tales of Misadventure and Triumph. New York: Palgrave Macmillan, 2008.
- Encyclopedia of the Spanish-American and Philippine-American Wars. Santa Barbara, Calif.: ABC-Clio, 2009.
- Evelyn, Douglas E.; Dickson, Paul; and Ackerman, S.J. On This Spot: Pinpointing the Past in Washington, D.C. Sterling, Va.: Capital Books, 2008.
- Federal Writers' Project. Washington, D.C.: A Guide to the Nation's Capital. Washington, D.C.: Federal Writers' Project, 1942.
- Fishback, Frederick L. "Chronicler's Report for 1917." Records of the Columbia Historical Society. 1918.
- Gallagher, Gary W. Three Days at Gettysburg: Essays on Confederate and Union Leadership. Kent, Ohio: Kent State University Press, 1999.
- Gillmore, Inez Haynes. The Story of the Woman's Party. New York: Harcourt, Brace, 1921.
- Goidel, Robert K.; Gross, Donald A.; Shields, Todd G. Money Matters: Consequences of Campaign Finance Reform in U.S. House Elections. Lanham, Md.: Rowman & Littlefield, 1999.
- Goode, James M. Capital Losses: A Cultural History of Washington's Destroyed Buildings. 2d ed. Washington, D.C.: Smithsonian Institution, 2003.
- "Group Formed to Save Lafayette Sq. Buildings." Washington Post. May 4, 1960.
- Hunter, Marjorie. "Old Homes Saved By Mrs. Kennedy." New York Times. September 27, 1962.
- Jackson, Luther P. "Old Lafayette Sq. Restoration Sought." Washington Post. November 30, 1961.
- Jarvis, J.F. Trolley Trips In and About Fascinating Washington. Washington, D.C.: J.F. Jarvis, 1900.
- "Lafayette, He Is Here." Time. December 13, 1963.
- "Lafayette Sq. Razing Plan Termed Folly." Washington Post. April 12, 1960.
- Lamoreaux, Naomi R. The Great Merger Movement in American Business, 1895–1904. New York: Cambridge University Press, 1985.
- Latimer, Louise Payson. Your Washington and Mine. New York: C. Scribner's Sons, 1924.
- "Legal Notices." Washington Law Reporter. Vol. XIII (January 1885 to January 1996). Washington, D.C.: John L. Ginck, 1885.
- Lindsay, John J. "Court Gets New Home All to Itself." Washington Post. February 25, 1960.
- Lockwood, Mary S. Historic Homes in Washington: Its Noted Men and Women. New York: Belford Co., 1889.
- Luria, Sarah. Capital Speculations: Writing and Building Washington. Durham, N.H.: University of New Hampshire Press, 2006.
- Magie, David. Life of Garret Augustus Hobart: Twenty-Fourth Vice-President of the United States. New York: G.P. Putnam's Sons, 1910.
- Marton, Kati. Hidden Power: Presidential Marriages That Shaped Our Recent History. New York: Random House, 2001.
- Miller, Nathan. Theodore Roosevelt: A Life. New York: Quill, 1992.
- Morgan, James. Theodore Roosevelt, the Boy and the Man. New York: The Macmillan Company, 1919.
- O'Toole, Patricia. The Five of Hearts: An Intimate Portrait of Henry Adams and His Friends, 1880–1918. Paperback ed. New York: Simon & Schuster, 2006.
- Oppel, Frank and Meisel, Tony. Washington, D.C.: A Turn-of-the-Century Treasury. Secaucus, N.J.: Castle, 1987.
- Paxson, Frederic L. Recent History Of The United States 1865–1929. New York: Houghton Mifflin Company, 1937.
- Peterson, Jon A. The Birth of City Planning in the United States, 1840–1917. Baltimore: Johns Hopkins University Press, 2003.
- Rand, McNally & Co.'s Pictorial Guide to Washington and Environs. Chicago: Rand, McNally, 1903.
- Richardson, Anna Steese. Standard Etiquette. New York: Harper & Brothers, 1925.
- Rorabaugh, W.J.; Critchlow, Donald T.; and Baker, Paula C. America's Promise: A Concise History of the United States. Lanham, Md.: Rowman & Littlefield, 2004.
- Samuels, Ernest. Henry Adams. Cambridge, Mass.: Belknap Press of Harvard University Press, 1989.
- "Senator Frye President Pro Tempore of the Senate." Timely Topics. November 17, 1899.
- "Senator Morse Joins Battle to Save Historic Sites on Lafayette Square." Washington Post. March 24, 1960.
- Smith, Hal H. "Historic Washington Homes." Records of the Columbia Historical Society, Washington. 1908.
- "State and Society in Washington." Harper's New Monthly Magazine. March 1878.
- Suckow, Elizabeth. "Hidden Headquarters." National Aeronautics and Space Administration. March 24, 2009. Archived February 15, 2013, at the Wayback Machine Accessed 2010-05-14.
- "3 Historic Buildings Befriended." Washington Post. March 2, 1960.
- The Twenty-Fifth Anniversary of the Founding of the Cosmos Club of Washington, D.C. With A Documentary History of the Club From Its Organization to November 16, 1903. Washington, D.C.: The Cosmos Club, 1904.
- "2 Federal Courts To Be Housed on Lafayette Square." Washington Post. September 17, 1960.
- Walther, Eric H. The Shattering of the Union: America in the 1850s. New York: Rowman & Littlefield, 2004.
- Watson, Winslow Marston. In Memoriam: Benjamin Ogle Tayloe. Philadelphia: Sherman & Co., 1872.
- Wentzel, Volkmar Kurt. Washington By Night. Golden, Colo.: Fulcrum, 1998.
- White, Jean. "Administration Anxious To Save Lafayette Park." Washington Post. February 17, 1961.
- White, Jean. "Garden Atmosphere of Lafayette Sq. Can Be Preserved, Says Architect." Washington Post. March 3, 1961.
- Whitman, William B. Washington, D.C.: Off the Beaten Path. Guilford, Conn.: Insiders' Guide, 2007.
