= Cutts–Madison House =

Historic building in Washington, D.C.

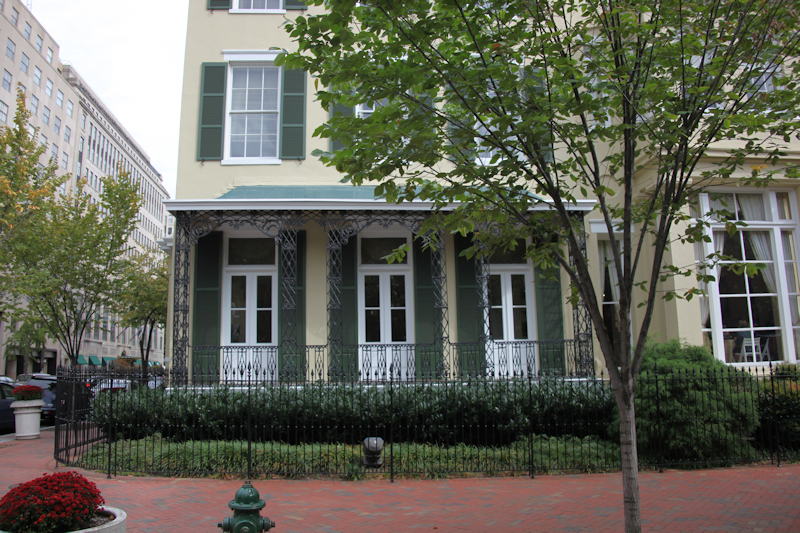
- The west side of the Cutts–Madison House

General information
- Architectural style: American colonial
- Location: Washington, D.C., United States
- Coordinates: 38°54′0.1″N 77°02′05.4″W
- Construction started: 1818; 208 years ago
- Completed: 1819; 207 years ago
- Cost: approximately $5,750 (in 1828)
- Client: Richard Cutts
- Cutts–Madison House
- U.S. National Historic Landmark District – Contributing property
- Part of: Lafayette Square Historic District (Washington, D.C.) (ID70000833)
- Designated NHLDCP: August 29, 1970

Technical details
- Size: originally 3,900 (approximately); 13,319 (2009)

The Cutts–Madison House (also known as the Dolley Madison House) is a Federal-style historic home, now used for offices, located at 1520 H Street NW in Washington, D.C. The house is best known for being the residence of former First Lady Dolley Madison, who lived there from November 1837 until her death in July 1849.

The Cutts–Madison House is part of the Lafayette Square Historic District, a National Historic Landmark District. Now owned by the federal government, it is used as part of a federal courts complex.

== Construction ==
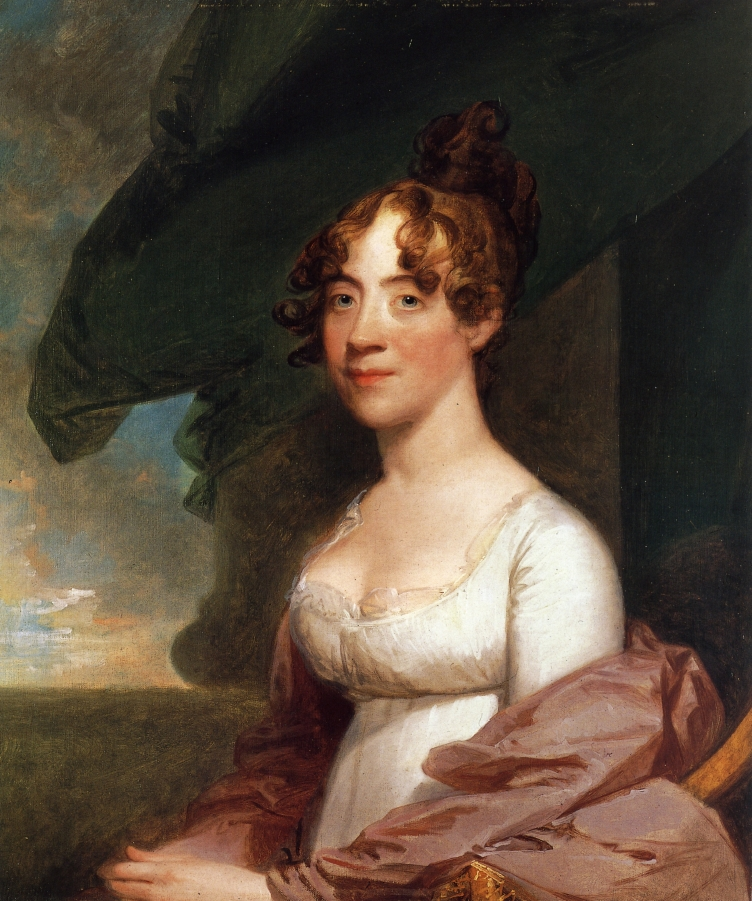
Anna Payne Cutts, by Gilbert Stuart, 1804. Collection of The White House

On March 31, 1793, the U.S. Commissioners in charge of selling federally owned lots in the District of Columbia agreed to sell square 221 to Samuel Davidson. Davidson died in 1810, and his son and two daughters inherited the property. Richard Cutts purchased lots 12, 13, 14, and 15 of square 221 from the Davidson heirs on October 3, 1818.

The house was constructed in 1818–1819 by Richard Cutts, who built the house for himself and his wife, Anna Payne Cutts (Dolley Payne Madison's sister). The house had two stories, a gabled roof, dormer windows, and chimneys at the north and south ends of the house. The exterior was originally grey stucco. The front of the house faced Lafayette Square. The lot on which the house sat was a large one, with extensive space on all sides. Dirt roads bordered the house on the west and north sides, and a large garden with flowers and fruit trees occupied the east and south sides of the house. The garden extended south as far as the Tayloe House on the south end of the block. The home was considered one of the more "pretentious" domiciles in the city at the time.

The city gravelled the street in front of the house in 1823.

== Occupants ==
=== Dolley Madison ===
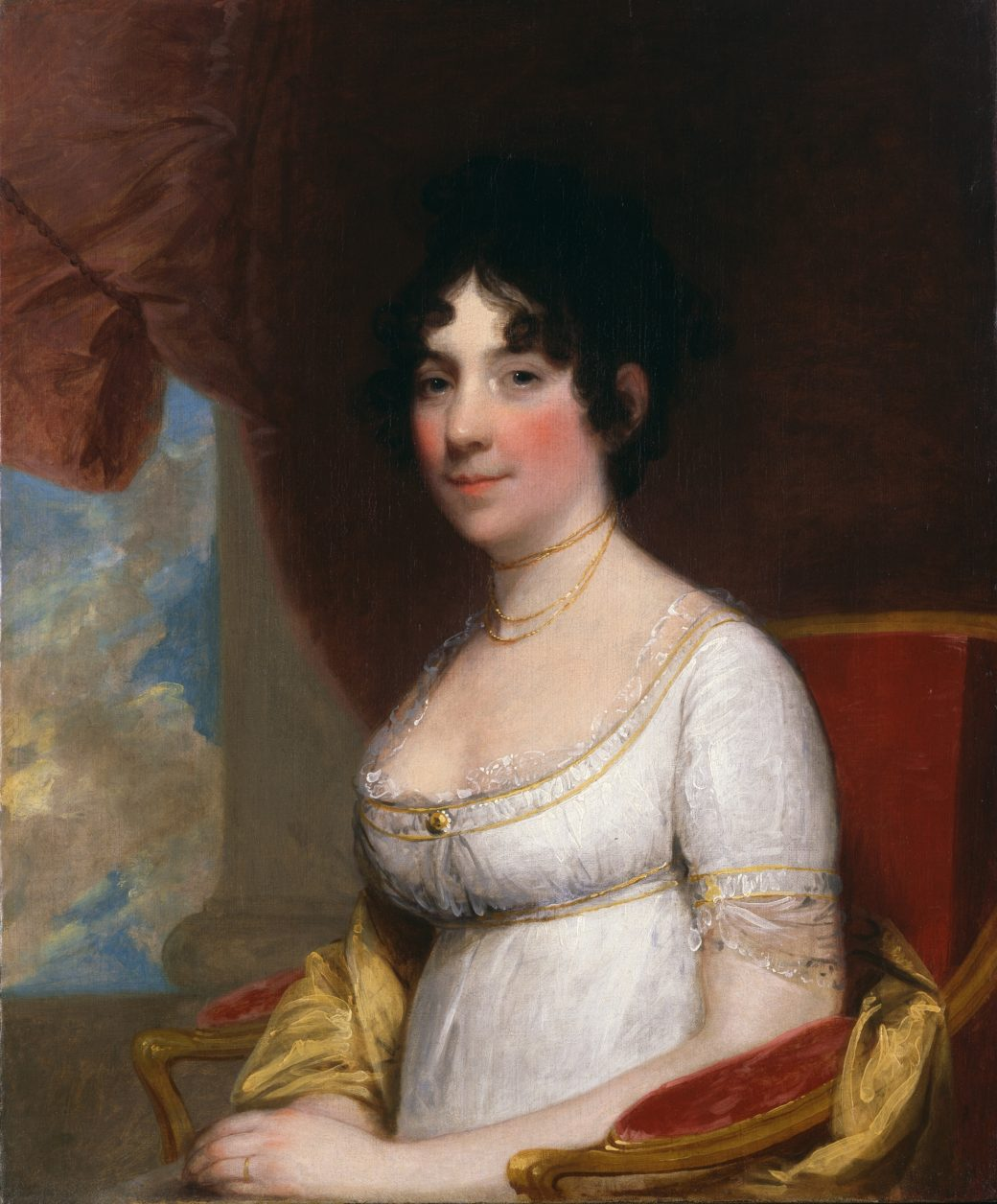
Dolley Madison by Gilbert Stuart, 1804

Cutts secured a mortgage to build the house, and on August 22, 1828, the bank holding the mortgage sold it to ex-President James Madison for $5,750. When James Madison died in 1836, Dolley Madison held the mortgage. Her husband's death had left Dolley Madison in a financially difficult position, so to reduce her expenses she took up residence in the house in November 1837. Presidents James Monroe, John Quincy Adams, Andrew Jackson, Martin Van Buren, William Henry Harrison, John Tyler, James K. Polk, and Zachary Taylor all visited her in the home, as did John C. Calhoun, Henry Clay, and Daniel Webster. Dolley Madison's financial difficulties continued, however. She also owned Montpelier, her husband's country estate and farm in the Piedmont of Virginia. But Montpelier's finances were in poor condition, and Dolley moved out of the Cutts–Madison House in 1839 to live once more at Montpelier and see if she could save the estate. She rented out the Cutts–Madison house, but was unable to stabilize Montpelier. She moved back to the Cutts–Madison House in 1843, and sold Montpelier in 1844.

In 1844 or 1845, after her return to the Cutts–Madison House, arsonists put lit matches into the shutters in the rear of the house, and Dolley Madison had to be wakened and saved from death by a servant. The fire was quickly put out, and the damage to the building was not extensive — Mrs. Madison returned to her bedroom the same night.

Dolley Madison lived in the house on Lafayette Square until her death on July 12, 1849. Her only surviving child, John Payne Todd (from her first marriage to Quaker lawyer John Todd), inherited the property. On April 3, 1851, Todd sold the house and property to Charles Wilkes.

=== Charles Wilkes ===
Rear Admiral Charles Wilkes purchased the house in 1851. Wilkes moved the entrance from Madison Place NW to H Street NW, and turned the porch on the west side of the house (facing Madison Place NW) into a window. The gable roof (which sloped east and west) was eliminated and a flat roof installed, an outbuilding added at the rear, and a bay window added on the south side. Wilkes also cut all windows on the first floor down so that they now reached the floor.

During the 1850s and 1860s, the house had a number of notable occupants in addition to the Wilkeses. After being named Special Envoy to Central America, Sir William Gore Ouseley rented the house in 1858 on his way to the region and entertained lavishly while living at the Cutts–Madison House. General George B. McClellan used the house as his Washington-based headquarters after the First Battle of Bull Run during the Civil War. McClellan first occupied the house on July 26, 1861, and left in late October for new headquarters at a house at the corner of H Street NW and 15th Street NW (where the Sofitel Lafayette Square Hotel now stands). After the Civil War, the Cutts–Madison House was briefly used by the French Claims Commission.

Wilkes mortgaged the house in 1855, and the mortgage passed through several hands over the next 15 years until George B. Warren secured it in 1870. Upon Warren's death in 1880, the mortgage was assigned to his daughter, Phebe Warren Tayloe. She died in 1882, and her niece Elizabeth H. Price came to hold the mortgage. Price sold the mortgage in December 1884 to Edward Tayloe Perry (a minor). Meanwhile, Charles Wilkes deeded the house over to his wife and three daughters in 1870. Wilkes died in 1877, and in 1886 the Wilkes family sold the house to the Cosmos Club for the sum of $40,000 (which sum paid the outstanding mortgage held in trust for Edward Tayloe Perry).

=== Cosmos Club ===
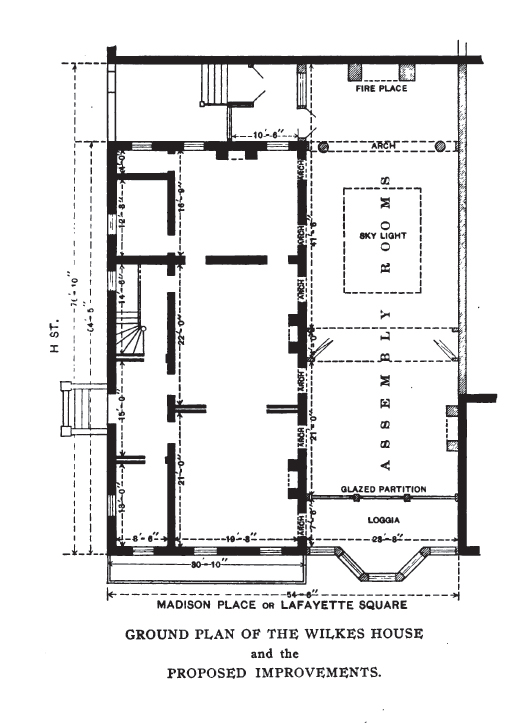
Plans for the renovations of the first floor of the Cutts–Madison House, made by the Cosmos Club in 1886.

The Cosmos Club immediately improved the height of the third floor by raising the roof, and added a large meeting hall by building a single-story 23 ft 8 in (7.21 m) extension to the south side of the house (with skylight).

The Cosmos Club made further improvements in 1893. Electricity was installed, the heating system upgraded, and general refurbishing of commons areas completed. Two additional stories were built over the assembly hall: The second story consisting of one large room, and a third story consisting of four meeting rooms. A bathroom was added to the third floor of the old building, above the existing second-floor bathroom. The eastern garden was removed, and a three-story addition built. The addition consisted of a ground floor with an entrance to the building on H Street NW, a cloakroom, and a connecting door to the assembly hall on the south side of the building; a second story with meeting rooms for the Cosmos Club as well as other societies which might use the premises; and a third story with lodgings and a meeting room for the Cosmos Club's board of directors. The basement of the original building was renovated and upgraded to include a kitchen, a bathroom, and an underground passage to the new addition. The goal of building the addition was to permit visiting societies (such as members of the National Geographic Society) to enter and use the building without disturbing members of the Cosmos Club. The total cost of the renovations was $15,000. Hornblower & Marshall were the architects of the addition, which was completed in January 1894.

In 1903, the Cosmos Club purchased from Henry Reed Rathbone for $33,000 No. 25 Madison Place NW, the building immediately to the south of the Cutts–Madison House (against which its three-story assembly hall addition abutted). This property (and the one to the south of it) were razed in 1909, and a five-story Cosmos Club lodging house built.

The Cosmos Club vacated the Cutts–Madison House in 1952 to move to new headquarters in the Townsend Mansion at 2121 Massachusetts Avenue NW, at which time the building was purchased by the U.S. government and used for offices.

== Federal ownership ==
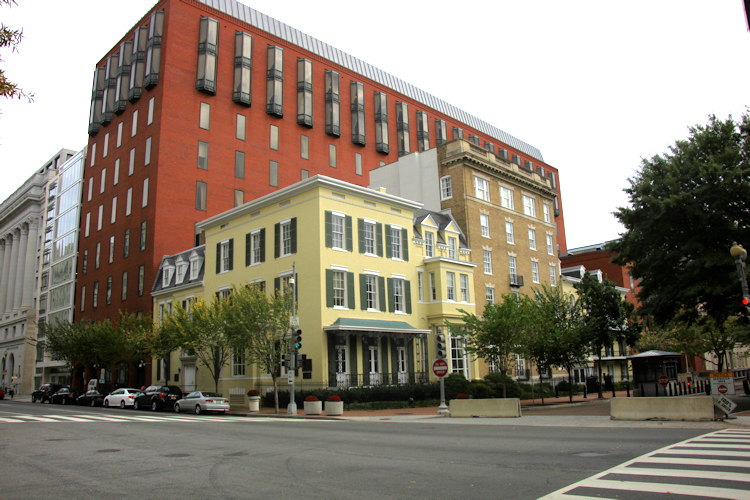
The Cutts–Madison House (corner), with the former Cosmos Club building (in tan) to the right and the National Courts building in the rear. These buildings were joined in a scheme to save the earlier historic structure in the 1960s and now serve as a courts complex.

In 1900, the United States Congress passed a resolution establishing the U.S. Senate Park Commission (also known as the "McMillan Commission" because it was chaired by Senator James McMillan [R-Mich.]). The Park Commission's charge was to reconcile competing visions for the development of Washington, D.C., and in particular the National Mall and adjacent areas. The Park Commission's proposals, which came to be known as the "McMillan Plan," proposed that all the buildings around Lafayette Square be razed and replaced by tall, Neoclassical buildings clad in white marble for use by executive branch agencies. For a time, it appeared that the Cutts–Madison House would not survive. William Wilson Corcoran's Corcoran House at 1615 H Street NW was torn down in 1922 and replaced with the Neoclassical United States Chamber of Commerce headquarters. The Hay-Adams Houses were razed in 1927 by real estate developer Harry Wardman, and the Hay–Adams Hotel built on the site. At nearby 1616 H Street NW, the Brookings Institution purchased the rear garden from the private owners of the Decatur House and built an eight-story Modernist office building there. Several million dollars were spent in the late 1950s on designs to raze all the buildings on the east side of Lafayette Square and replace them with a white, modernist office building which would house judicial offices.

Opposition to the demolition of the Cutts–Madison House and other buildings on Lafayette Square began forming shortly after the plan to raze the structures was announced. Senators James E. Murray and Wayne Morse, several members of the House of Representatives, and citizens of the District of Columbia lobbied to defeat the legislation authorizing the demolition of the buildings. The American Institute of Architects (AIA) devoted the February 1961 issue of its journal to a "Lament for Lafayette Square." The AIA established a committee to develop plans to save the buildings and adapt the new structures so that they incorporated the style and feel of the older homes.

The newly elected Kennedy administration indicated on February 16, 1961, that it was anxious to retain the existing historic homes on Lafayette Square. In November, the Committee of 100 on the Federal City (an influential group of city leaders) asked President Kennedy to save and restore all the remaining buildings on Lafayette Square. In February 1962, First Lady Jacqueline Kennedy lobbied General Services Administration (GSA) director Bernard L. Boutin to stop the demolition and adopt a different design plan. "The wreckers haven't started yet, and until they do it can be saved," she wrote. Mrs. Kennedy enlisted architect John Carl Warnecke, a friend of her husband who happened to be in town that weekend, to create a design that would incorporate the new buildings with the old. Warnecke conceived the basic design over that weekend, and worked closely with Mrs. Kennedy over the next few months to formalize the design proposal. The design was presented to the public and the Commission of Fine Arts (which had approval over any plan) in October 1962, and with Mrs. Kennedy's backing the Commission adopted the revised Warnecke design proposal.

Warnecke's design was based on the architectural theory of contextualism, where modern buildings are harmonized with the urban forms usual to a traditional city. Not only did Warnecke's design build the first modern buildings on Lafayette Square, but they were the first buildings in the city to utilize contextualism as a design philosophy. Warnecke's design for the National Courts Building was to create tall, flat structures in red brick which would serve as relatively unobtrusive backgrounds to the lighter-colored residential homes like the Cutts–Madison House. The Cutts–Madison House, Cosmos Club building, and Benjamin Ogle Tayloe House were joined, and a courtyard built between them and the National Courts building.

The Cutts–Madison House remains part of the courts complex, which houses various offices and chambers for the United States Court of Federal Claims and United States Court of Appeals for the Federal Circuit.

== Reported haunting ==
Since the mid-19th century, witnesses have claimed to have seen the ghost of Dolley Madison rocking in a chair in the space where the porch on the west side of the house used to be, smiling at passersby.

== See also ==
- Architecture of Washington, D.C.
