= U.S. Chamber of Commerce Building =

- US Chamber of Commerce Building
- U.S. National Register of Historic Places
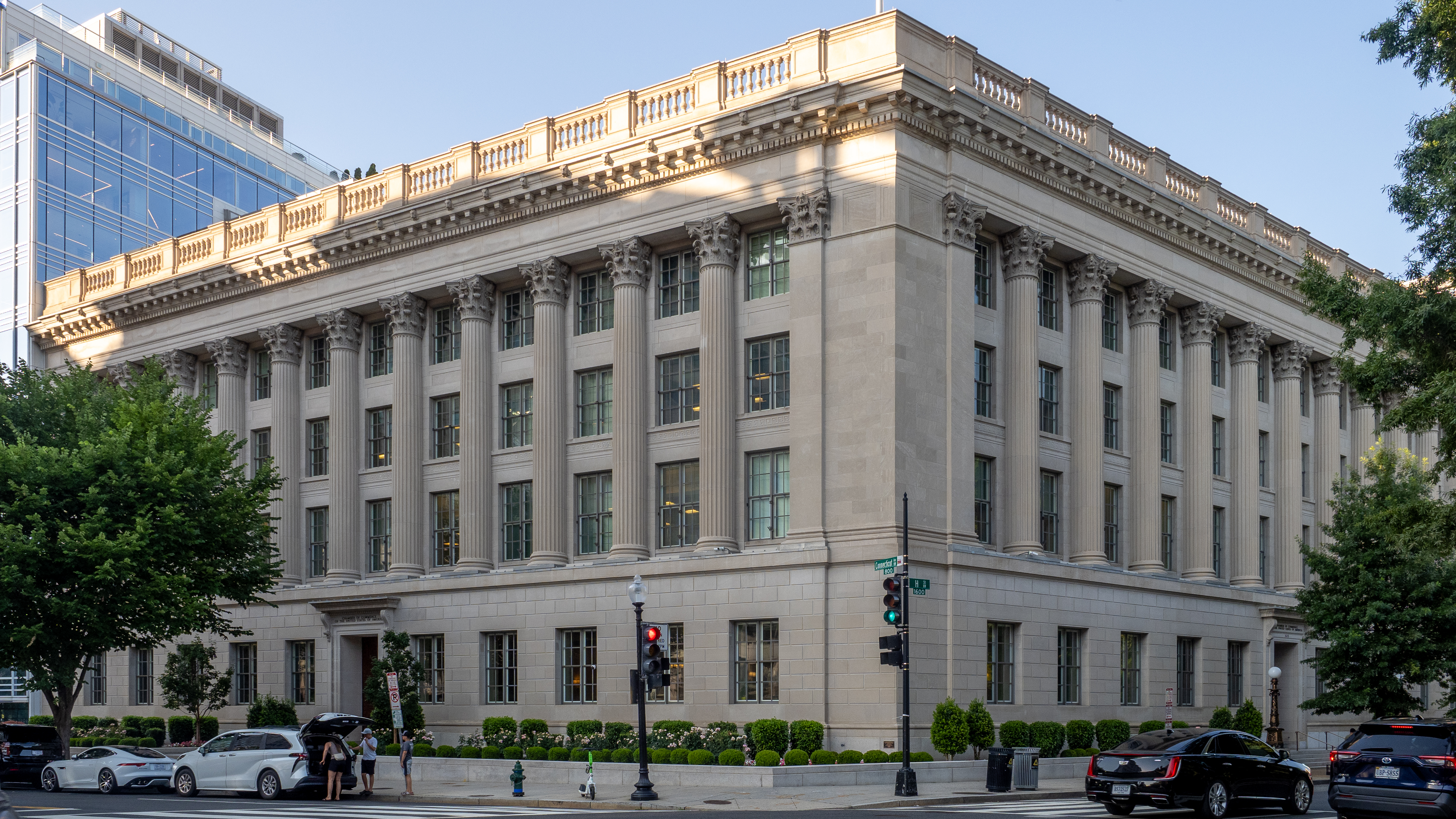
- U.S. Chamber of Commerce Building in 2024

- Location within Central Washington, D.C. Location within the District of Columbia Location within the United States
- Location: 1615 H St., NW., Washington, District of Columbia
- Coordinates: 38°54′1.8″N 77°2′15.4″W
- Area: less than one acre
- Built: 1925
- Architect: Gilbert, Cass
- Architectural style: Beaux Arts
- NRHP reference No.: 92000499
- Added to NRHP: May 13, 1992

The U.S. Chamber of Commerce Building is an historic Beaux Arts style building located at 1615 H St., NW., in Washington, D.C. It was built for the U.S. Chamber of Commerce and remains their headquarters.

== History ==
It was designed by Cass Gilbert and built in 1925. It was listed on the National Register of Historic Places in 1992, for its architecture.

The building occupies land that was formerly the home of Daniel Webster.
