= President's Park =

- U.S. National Register of Historic Places
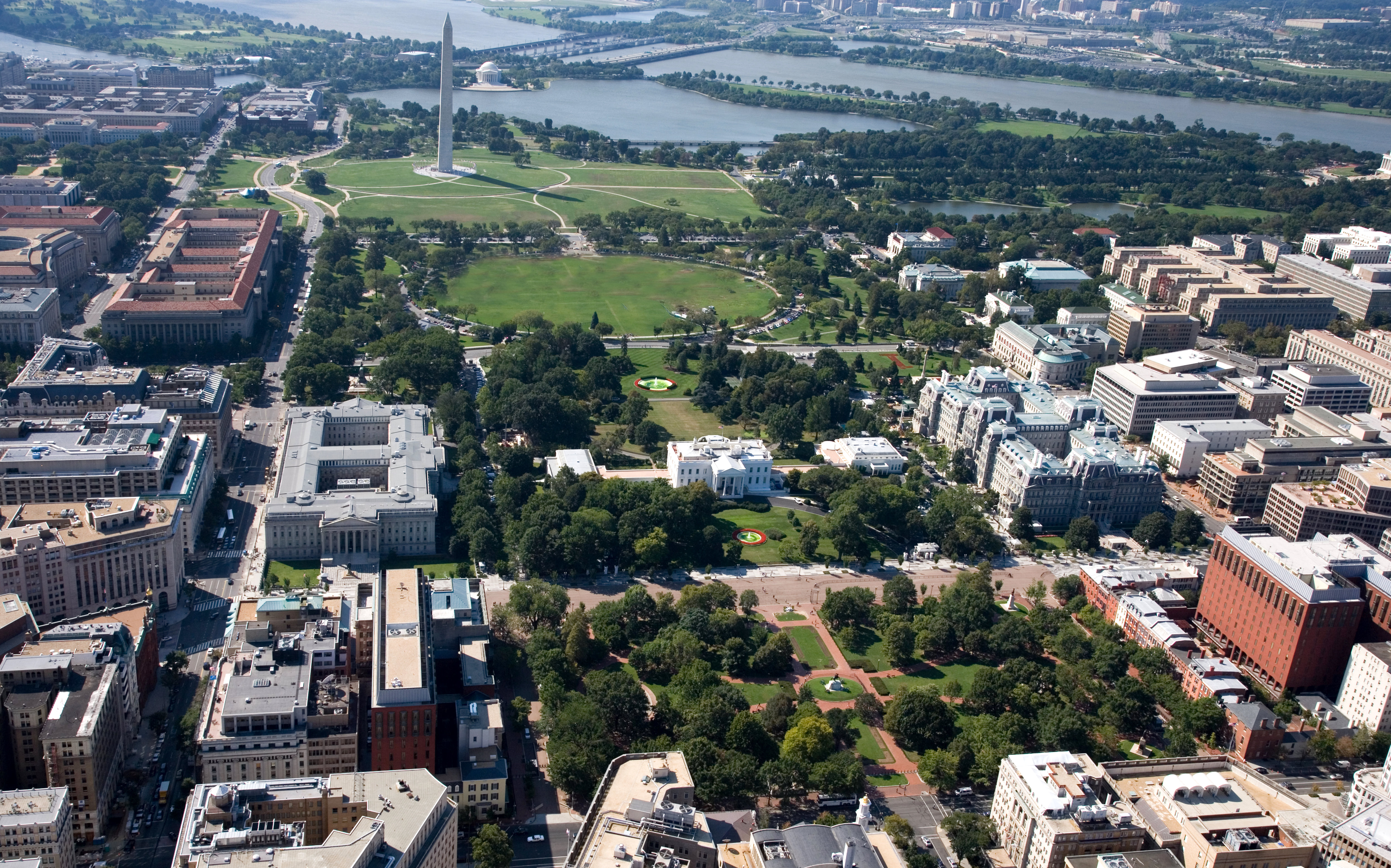
- President's Park in Washington, D.C., including (left to right in center): The Ellipse, the White House, and Lafayette Square

- Location within Central Washington, D.C. Location within the District of Columbia Location within the United States
- Location: Washington, D.C., U.S.
- Coordinates: 38°53′46″N 77°2′12″W
- Area: 77.48 acres (31.36 ha)
- Built: 1791
- Architect: L'Enfant, Pierre C.; Downing, A.J.
- Visitation: 714,224 (2022)
- Website: President's Park (White House)
- NRHP reference No.: 80000347
- Added to NRHP: May 6, 1980

President's Park, located in downtown Washington, D.C., encompasses the White House and includes the Eisenhower Executive Office Building, the Treasury Building, and grounds; the White House Visitor Center; Lafayette Square; and the Ellipse. President's Park was the original name of Lafayette Square.

President's Park is administered by the National Park Service.

The park is officially referred to as President's Park or The White House and President's Park.

== White House and adjacent buildings ==
A map of President's Park in Washington, D.C.

In 1790, under the Residence Act, Philadelphia was designated as the nation's temporary capital while the permanent capital was constructed in Washington, D.C. Contests were held to solicit designs for both the United States Capitol and what was then called the President's House. James Hoban's design was selected, and he supervised the construction.

In 1800, the new national capital in Washington, D.C., was finalized and opened.

The White House was later expanded with the addition of the West Wing and East Wing, which now houses the office of the president and presidential staff. The White House grounds include the South Lawn, Rose Garden, Jacqueline Kennedy Garden, and North Lawn.

To the west of the White House, across from the West Wing is the Eisenhower Executive Office Building, formerly the Department of State, War, and Navy, and to the east is the Treasury Building.

== Lafayette Square ==
Lafayette Square is a 6.97 acre (28,191 m^{2}) public park located directly north of the White House on H Street, bounded by Jackson Place on the west, Madison Place on the east, and Pennsylvania Avenue to the south. The square and the surrounding historic townhouse structures were designated a National Historic Landmark District in 1970. Planned as part of the pleasure grounds surrounding the Executive Mansion, this square was originally called "President's Park", which is now the name of the larger National Park Service unit.

In 1804, the park was separated from the White House grounds, when third President Thomas Jefferson had Pennsylvania Avenue cut through east–west. In 1824, the park was renamed in honor of the Marquis de Lafayette, the Frenchman and military officer who fought in the American Revolutionary War, 1775–1783.

Lafayette Square has been used as a racetrack, a graveyard, a zoo, a slave market, an encampment for soldiers during the War of 1812, and many political protests and celebrations. Andrew Jackson Downing landscaped Lafayette Square in 1851 in the picturesque style.

== The Ellipse ==
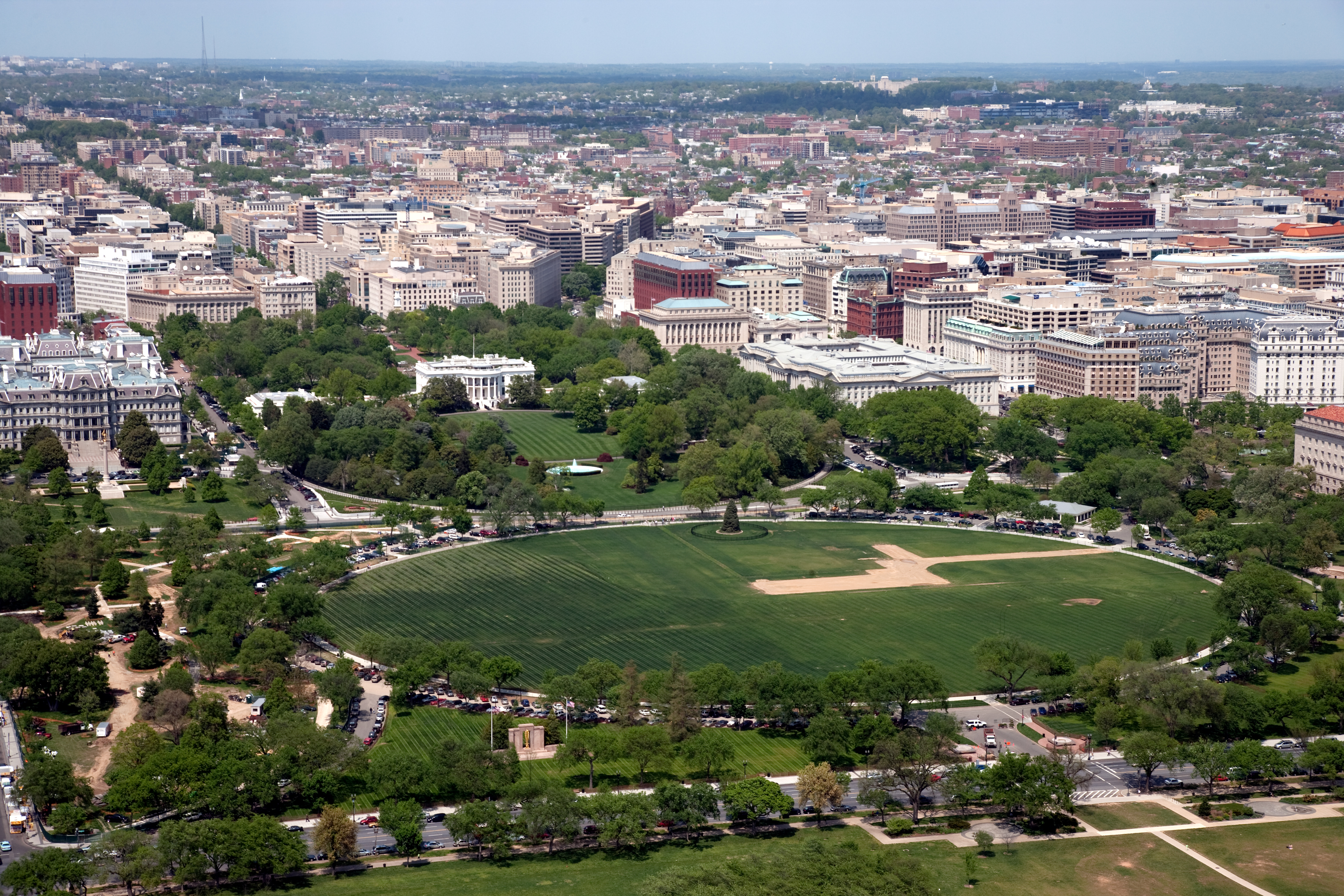
A May 2010 aerial view of The Ellipse and White House grounds

President's Park South, commonly called The Ellipse, is a 52 acres (21 ha) park located just south of the White House fence. The entire park is open to the public, and features monuments within walking distance, including the Washington Monument, the Lincoln Memorial, the Jefferson Memorial, and others.

The park was conceived in 1791, the first plan for the park was drawn up by Pierre (Peter) Charles L'Enfant. During the Civil War between 1861 and 1865, the grounds of the Ellipse and the not yet complete Washington Monument were used as corrals for horses, mules, and cattle, and as campsites for Union Army troops. In 1867, the Army Corps of Engineers began landscaping work on the Ellipse, and worked on it to the late 1880s.

== White House Visitor Center ==
The White House Visitor Center is located in the north end of the Herbert C. Hoover Building, which also houses the Department of Commerce, located off The Ellipse between 14th and 15th Streets on Pennsylvania Avenue NW,

Since the September 11 attacks, the visitor center no longer serves as a starting point for those going on a reserved tour of the White House. The exhibits provide an alternative visitor experience for those not able to go on a tour. The themes of the six permanent exhibits are first families, symbols and images, White House architecture, White House interiors, the working White House, and ceremonies and celebrations. Other exhibits change throughout the year.
