= Outline of counseling =

Counseling is the professional guidance of the individual by utilizing psychological methods especially in collecting case history data, using various techniques of the personal interview, and testing interests and aptitudes.

This is a list of counseling topics.

== Therapeutic modalities ==
- Academic advising
- Brief psychotherapy
- Career counseling
- Christian counseling
- Co-counseling
- Connectionism
- Consultant (medicine)
- Counseling psychology
- Couples therapy
- Credit counseling
- Crisis hotline
- Disciplinary counseling
- Ecological counseling
- Emotionally focused therapy
- Existential counseling
- Exit counseling
- Expressive Arts Therapy
- Family therapy
- Genetic counseling
- Grief counseling
- Intervention
- Licensed professional counselor
- Mental health care navigator
- Mental health counselor
- Narrative therapy
- Navy counselor
- Nouthetic counseling
- Online counseling
- Pastoral counseling
- Person-centered therapy
- Postvention
- Pre-conception counseling
- Pregnancy options counseling
- Professional practice of behavior analysis
- Psychiatric and mental health nursing
- Psychiatrist
- Re-evaluation counseling
- Rehabilitation counseling
- School counselor
- Senior peer counseling
- Social work
- Solution-focused brief therapy
- Suicide intervention
- Support group
- Telephone counseling

== Common areas ==
- Body language
- Conflict resolution
- Creative problem-solving
- Dialogue
- Dispute resolution
- Emotional conflict
- Experiential education
- Health psychology
- Human potential movement
- Interpersonal communication
- Intrapersonal communication
- Mediation
- Multitheoretical psychotherapy
- Nonverbal communication
- Nonviolent communication
- Problem solving
- Relationship education
- Responsibility assumption
- Stress management

== See also ==
- List of psychotherapies
- Outline of communication
- Outline of psychology
- Outline of sociology
  - Subfields of sociology
- Outline of self
- Psychopharmacology
