= Benjamin Ogle Tayloe =

American politician

Benjamin "Ogle" Tayloe
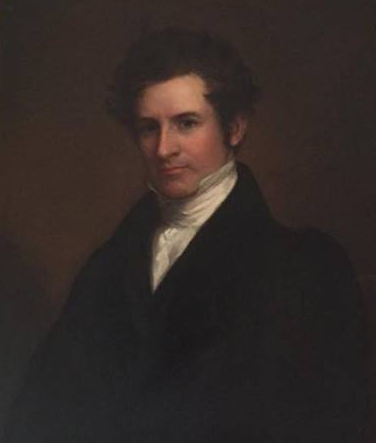
- Portrait of Benjamin Ogle Tayloe by Thomas Sully
- Born: May 21, 1796; Ogle Hall, Annapolis, Maryland, U.S.
- Died: February 25, 1868 (aged 71); Rome, Italy

Benjamin "Ogle" Tayloe (May 21, 1796 — February 25, 1868) was an American businessman, bon vivant, diplomat, scion of colonial tidewater gentry, and influential political activist in Washington, D.C. during the first half of the 19th century. Although he never held elective office, he was a prominent Whig and influential in presidential electoral politics in the 1840s and 1850s. His home, the Tayloe House, became a salon for politically powerful people in the federal government and socially influential individuals in the United States and abroad. Tayloe was also a party in the important 1869 contract law case, Willard v. Tayloe, 75 U.S. 557.

== Birth and schooling ==
Tayloe was born on May 21, 1796, at Ogle Hall in Annapolis, Maryland, a home belonging to his maternal grandfather, Benjamin Ogle, the ninth governor of Maryland. His maternal great-grandfather was former provincial governor Samuel Ogle, descended from an ancient Northern English Family, the Barons Ogle, a family allied with the Talbots of Shrewsbury (the premier Earldom in England), Cavendish's of Newcastle, Barons de Ros and ancient Norman House of Percy. Tayloe's father was Colonel John Tayloe III, one of the richest people in Virginia. Colonel Tayloe had built The Octagon House in 1800, and his great-grandfather. John Tayloe II, built the great country estate house of Mount Airy in Richmond County, Virginia, in 1762 on an estate his father, John Tayloe I inherited from his father William Tayloe (the nephew) previously known as "Tayloe's Quarter." In addition, he counted as his progenitors' such men of the tidewater gentry at Col. Thomas Addison of Oxon Hill Manor, and Benjamin Tasker Sr.

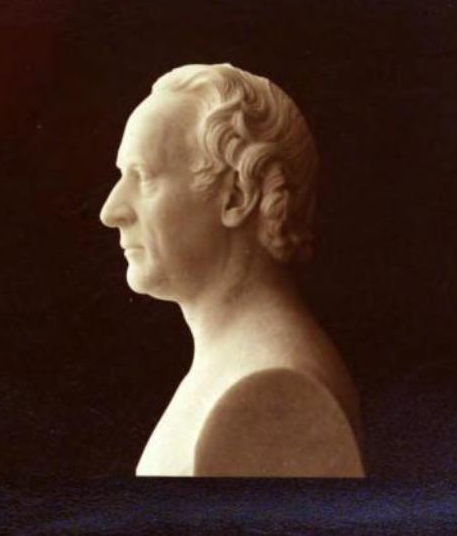
Bust of Benjamin Ogle Tayloe by Powers

He was tutored by Samuel Hoar, a prominent lawyer and politician in the state of Massachusetts. When he was 13 years old, he entered Phillips Exeter Academy in Exeter, New Hampshire. His roommate was John Adams Dix, later the United States Secretary of the Treasury, a U.S. senator, and 24th governor of New York. He entered Harvard College in 1811, where his classmates included some of the most prominent Americans of the next half-century: historian Jared Sparks; jurist Theophilus Parsons; cleric and politician John G. Palfrey; Unitarian minister Convers Francis; businessman John Amory Lowell; and historian William H. Prescott. He was a member of the Porcellian Club. While in college during the War of 1812, he witnessed the famous battle between HMS Shannon and USS Chesapeake. He dined with Chesapeake's captain, James Lawrence, the night before the battle. He graduated from Harvard in 1815.

== Diplomatic career ==
From 1815 to 1817, Tayloe studied law under United States Attorney General Richard Rush. When Rush was appointed Minister to Great Britain in 1817, Tayloe was named his Private Secretary. While in London, he lived at 15 King Street, Portman Square. He visited often with many of Great Britain's most influential politicians and nobility. His American associates in London included Robert Gilmor Jr. and wife, Robert Goodloe Harper and his wife, daughter of Charles Carroll of Carrollton; Washington Allston, and Messers. Gibbes of Charleston, William Gray Brooks, George Eustis Sr., Edward Everett, Theodore Lyman II, George Peabody, Thomas Aspinwall (consul), Thomas Handasyd Perkins of Boston; Archibald Gracie II, Joseph Delafield, Edward Livingston (speaker) of New York. He became close friends with the young painter Washington Allston and the author Washington Irving. He was presented to the Prince Regent, George, in 1818 and was invited to a birthday party for him. He then traveled widely; to Ireland, and Scotland where he met with Thomas Brown (philosopher), David Erskine, 11th Earl of Buchan, brother of Thomas Erskine, 1st Baron Erskine, at Dryburgh Abbey, before heading to the continent. He was an observer at the Congress of Aix-la-Chapelle in 1818 and attended a ball at the conclusion by securing the ticket of Prince Metternich who could not attend. He then traveled to Italy and toured Rome with the aforementioned R.G. Haper and wife, the former Ms Carroll of Carrollton where he was presented to Ferdinand III, Grand Duke of Tuscany, Pope Pius VII. He dined with Lucien Bonaparte, and was entertained by Pauline Bonaparte, Princess Borghese, along with Henry Brougham, 1st Baron Brougham and Vaux. He traveled to Paris in the spring of 1819, where Minister to France Albert Gallatin introduced him to King Louis XVIII and Talleyrand.

Tayloe returned to the United States in November 1819 and settled at Windsor (his inherited family estate in King George County, Virginia), where he began writing for various horse racing and horse breeding publications.

On November 8, 1824, Tayloe married Julia Maria Dickinson of Troy, New York. The couple had six children: John (born 1826), Edward (born 1829), Estelle (born 1833), Anna (born 1834), Eugenie (born 1835), and Julia (born 1838). Anna died when just two years old. Although Tayloe preferred to live at Windsor, his wife asked that they move into the city where she was more comfortable.

On March 23, 1828, Tayloe's father, Col. John Tayloe III, died. In 1816 Col. Tayloe had built six two-story houses facing Pennsylvania Avenue at 14th Street NW, and in 1817 had leased them to John Tennison who ran them as a hotel. The structures served as a hotel for the next three decades, the leaseholder and name changing several times: Williamson's Mansion Hotel, Fullers American House, and the City Hotel.

He adopted his father's coat of arms, Purpure a sword palewise proper between two lions rampant addorsed [Argent?]. The sword John III and Benjamin displayed was an epee; the only child of Sarah Knowles Bolton, librarian Charles Knowles Bolton, considered that the lions were likely Ermine rather than Argent.

== Later career ==
=== Residence in Washington, D.C. ===
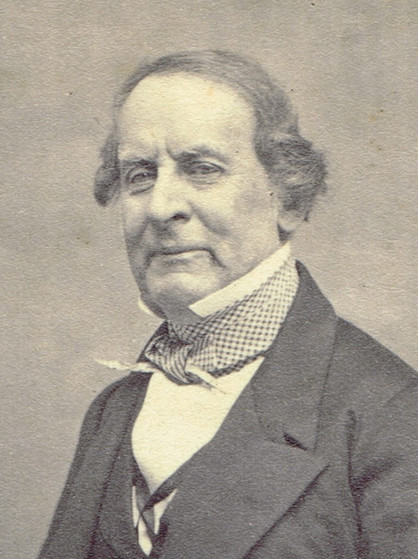
Benjamin Ogle Tayloe of Washington DC

In 1828, Tayloe built his wife a house in Washington, D.C., directly across the street from the White House. The Tayloes did not immediately occupy their home, however. Tayloe had a strong political disagreement with the newly elected president, Andrew Jackson, and refused to move into the home. Instead, Tayloe leased the building to Thomas Swann Sr., a lawyer (and the father of Thomas Swann Jr., who became Governor of Maryland in 1866). Swann vacated the home in November 1829, at which time Tayloe and his wife made the house their permanent residence.

Over the four decades following its construction, the Tayloe House was an important social gathering place for prominent Washingtonians. In 1829, when Henry Clay left the office of Secretary of State, much of the furniture in his home was acquired by the Tayloes and used to decorate their home. Tayloe House was the last house in Washington which President William Henry Harrison visited before he died in 1841.

In 1859 Tayloe House was the scene of a murder. Philip Barton Key II was the son of Francis Scott Key and the nephew of Chief Justice Roger B. Taney. In the spring of 1858, Key began having an affair with Teresa Bagioli Sickles, the wife of his friend Daniel Sickles. On February 26, 1859, Sickles learned of the affair. The following day, he saw Key in Lafayette Square signalling to his wife. Sickles rushed out into the park, drew a single pistol, and shot the unarmed Key three times while the other man pleaded for his life. Key was taken into the nearby Tayloe House and died moments later. Key's spirit, eyewitnesses and authors claim, now haunts Lafayette Square and can be seen on dark nights near the spot where he was shot.

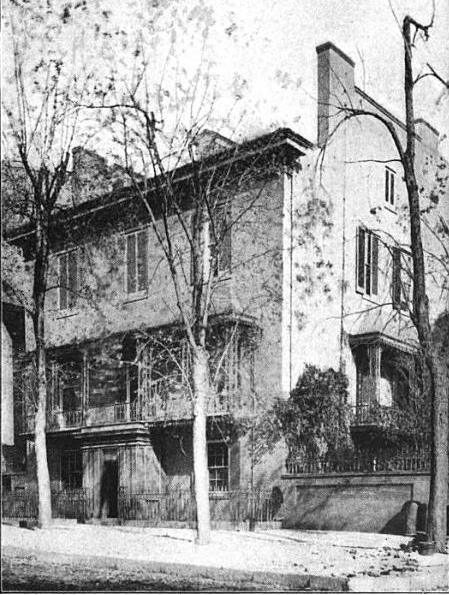
The Benjamin Ogle Tayloe House in 1886.

As Tayloe was one of the most influential and active members of the Whig Party in the District of Columbia, the Tayloe house became a noted meeting place for many of the leading political figures of early 19th century American politics. Among the many frequent visitors to the house were Chief Justice John Marshall, Senator and Secretary of State Henry Clay, Senator and Secretary of State Daniel Webster, Vice President and Secretary of State John C. Calhoun, Senator Henry Clay, Senator and Secretary of State Lewis Cass, Secretary of State Edward Livingston, Speaker of the House and Senator Robert Charles Winthrop, General Winfield Scott, Senator and Secretary of State Edward Everett, Senator and Secretary of State William H. Seward, Associate Justice Joseph Story, and many others. Presidents John Quincy Adams, Martin Van Buren, William Henry Harrison, Zachary Taylor, and Millard Fillmore also were frequent guests. Anthony Trollope spent much of his free time being entertained by the Tayloes at their home during his visit to Washington in the winter of 1862.

==== Country estate ====
In addition to his home in Washington City, Tayloe owned Petworth (Washington, D.C.), a 205-acre (83 ha) estate in Washington County near the Soldiers' Home at the northeast corner of 7th Street Pike and Rock Creek Church Road.

=== Plantation activities ===
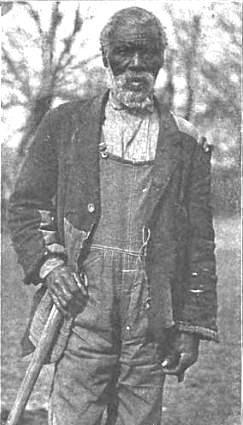
"Uncle" Jim Lawson, an African American born into slavery and enslaved by Benjamin Ogle Tayloe. He was moved from Maryland to the Windsor plantation in Alabama around 1845. This photo depicts him at age 94 in 1915, still working on the Tayloe estate.

Tayloe purchased cotton plantations in northeast Marengo (now Hale) and southwest Perry counties between Uniontown and Selma, Alabama, in 1836. A slave owner, Tayloe gradually moved most of his slaves from Virginia to Alabama, and invested most of his capital in the plantation. The Tayloes spent the following year traveling in Europe. The plantation was managed by Tayloe's younger brother, Henry Augustine Tayloe, who proved a less than capable manager and was relieved of his position in 1843. The Tayloe property flourished afterward, and by 1851 Benjamin and his other brother, William, owned seven plantations (which included more than 13,146 acres (5,320 ha) and 465 slaves worth $334,250 [about $13.6 million in 2010 inflation-adjusted dollars]).

The Tayloes were the largest absentee landlords in Alabama. Overseer Robert Morgan earned $1,200 annually for his duties on the Benjamin Ogle Tayloe plantation, 2.4 times what most overseers in the Canebrake Region of Alabama did. Tayloe visited his property in Alabama only twice during his lifetime.

Tayloe's views on slavery were somewhat moderate in nature. He strongly (but privately) disapproved of sexually abusing slaves and miscegenation. He felt it inappropriate to ask his daughters to inherit slaves (except for a few household slaves, if the girls wished it). Although Tayloe supported slavery as a legal institution, he did not feel the issue should bring about the dissolution of the Union. During the slavery crisis of 1850, Tayloe favored maintaining union over maintaining slavery in the Deep South. He wrote at the time:

S.C. is ripe for disunion. ... Her glory has departed—& she knows it. That is the rub. But the Union must & will be preserved—as I think. Still S.C. may annoy our sisterhood with her old maidish complaints & reproaches. She is proud & poor—having been rich! Poor S.C.! Nonetheless, he generally opposed freeing the slaves, and believed that slavery and union could co-exist if only partisan political feeling could be reduced. When Representative Preston Brooks of South Carolina beat Senator Charles Sumner with a cane (leaving him severely wounded) on the floor of the U.S. Senate in 1856, Tayloe applauded Brooks' actions and said Sumner "deserved a sound thrashing—& got it!" When Fort Sumter was shelled by Confederate forces (opening the American Civil War), Tayloe believed that peace could still be restored.

A prominent Whig, Tayloe supported Henry Clay for President in 1840. When Clay did not win the nomination, Tayloe supported William Henry Harrison, and his efforts on Harrison's behalf led the new president to consider him a confidante. Tayloe also played an important role in Henry Clay's unsuccessful 1844 candidacy for President of the United States. He made many friends among the diplomatic corps, among them the Belgian Envoy Extraordinary and Minister Plenipotentiary Comte Auguste Vanderstraeten-Ponthoz, with whom he met in 1843 (the Comte departed in 1844) and kept up a 20-year correspondence.

After a long illness, Julia Tayloe died on July 4, 1846.

=== Willard Hotel lawsuit ===
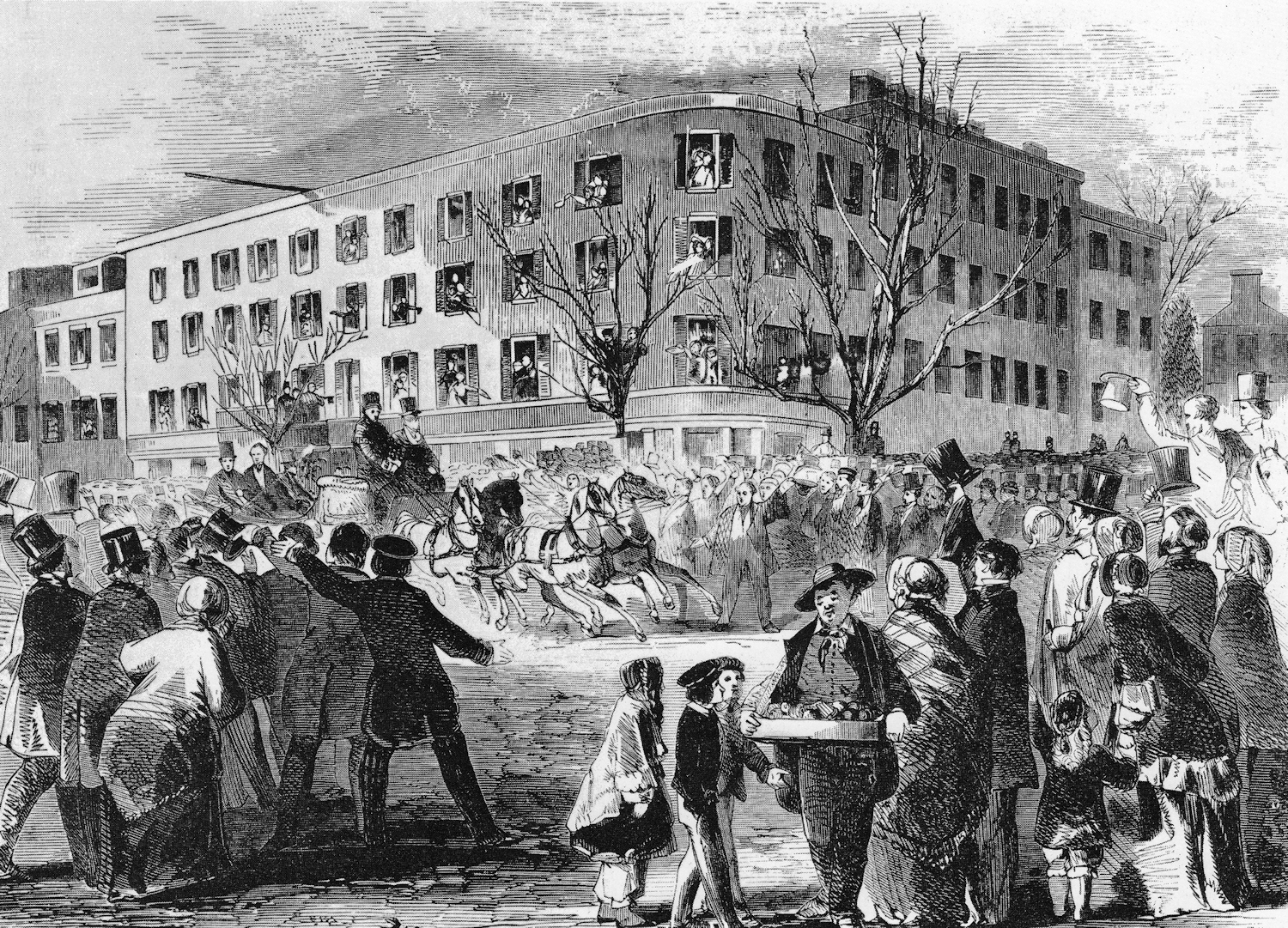
Engraving depicting the Willard Hotel in 1853.

Tayloe divested himself of his hotel business in 1847. He had renovated the "hotel" on Pennsylvania Avenue in 1843 and 1844. But by 1847 the structures were in disrepair and Tayloe was desperate to find a tenant who would maintain them and run the enterprise profitably. A chance encounter led to the founding of one of the most legendary hotels in the city's history. Tayloe had become engaged to Phoebe Warren, another young woman from Troy, New York. Miss Warren was traveling on the Steamer Niagara (a ship which traveled up and down the Hudson River) when she met Henry Willard, a chief steward aboard the vessel. Miss Warren was so impressed with the way Willard handled the ship's and passengers' needs that she recommended him to her fiancé. Willard visited Washington, D.C., in October 1847 to meet with Tayloe, who subsequently leased the six hotel buildings to him. Willard combined them into a single structure in 1850 and enlarged it into a four story-hotel he called the Willard Hotel.

Tayloe's lease to Willard later generated an important case before the Supreme Court of the United States. In 1854, Tayloe leased the property again to Willard, this time for 10 years at a rate of $1,200 per year. The lease contained a provision that Willard could purchase the entire property at any time during the life of the lease for $22,500—$2,000 in "cash" down payment and another $2,000 a year plus interest thereafter until the mortgage was paid. During the lease, the Civil War broke out and property values in Washington, D.C., skyrocketed. In 1863, Congress passed the National Banking Act, which authorized the federal government to issue United States Notes (paper money) rather than certificates redeemable in gold. On April 15, 1864, two weeks before the lease was due to expire, Willard tendered the down payment to Tayloe in paper money. Tayloe refused to issue the mortgage and turn over the deed, claiming that the hotel was now worth much more than $22,500 (~$366,187 in 2024) and that Willard had not paid in gold (the only form of cash available in 1854) as specified in the lease. Willard sued. The Supreme Court of the District of Columbia held against Willard. Willard appealed. In 1869, the U.S. Supreme Court held that the terms of the lease should not be interpreted as of the date it was agreed to (1854). Congress had made the use of gold and silver as currency illegal during the war, and this change in the law enabled Willard to pay the down payment in paper currency. The Court also held that the terms of the lease did not provide for a re-evaluation of the worth of the hotel, and that Willard was entitled to the original $22,500 purchase price. For many years, the decision was the leading case in contract law regarding intent and enforcement.

=== Later life ===
Coat of Arms of Benjamin Ogle Tayloe

Tayloe married Phoebe Warren, one of his wife's friends, on April 17, 1849. The Tayloe household became a hub of entertaining and political activity once more after Whig Zachary Taylor became president in 1849. Tayloe remained an influential figure in national Whig politics even after Taylor's death on July 9, 1850, and the assumption of Millard Fillmore to the presidency. Tayloe made the first of two trips to Alabama to visit his business there in late 1850, and spent some time in the city of New Orleans, Louisiana, before traveling to Havana, Cuba. Although Tayloe was an influential backer of Fillmore for re-election in 1852, he was on intimate terms with General Winfield Scott, the candidate who defeated Fillmore for the Whig nomination for president.

During this period, Tayloe was also a director of the Monument Association, which was striving to build the Washington Monument. He was elected president of the Board of Trustees of the Washington Orphan Asylum in 1855, and from 1865 until his death in 1868 was president of the Association of the Oldest Inhabitants of the District of Columbia (an association of citizens who had lived in the District of Columbia at least 20 years). In the 1850s and 1860s he was regularly asked to run for Mayor of Washington, but declined every time. He was a very close friend of Francis Napier, 10th Lord Napier, the Minister Plenipotentiary to the United States from 1857 to 1859.

In the critical presidential election of 1860, with the Whig Party in disarray, Tayloe worked to elect former Senator John Bell (running as the candidate of the Constitutional Union Party). He attempted to convince the Southern Democratic Party candidate, Vice President John C. Breckinridge, to withdraw his candidacy in favor of a "fusion" party that would defeat the Republican Party candidate, Abraham Lincoln. When Lincoln won the election, Tayloe met with the president-elect on November 8, 1860, and expressed his views on the need for union in a letter which he handed to him. Lincoln read it over twice, then said, "I am not yet elected President, and shall not be until I receive the vote of the electors."

=== Civil War years ===
At the start of the Civil War, Tayloe was reputed to be the richest man in America. But with the outbreak of war and the loss of his Alabama and Virginia lands, Tayloe lost more than half a million dollars (about $20.3 million in inflation-adjusted 2010 dollars).

Some historians have alleged that Tayloe may have been a spy for the Confederate States of America during the Civil War. William Tidwell and others point out that he was a noted Southern sympathizer, and that he had the education, skill, connections, and opportunity. Tidwell has even alleged that Tayloe met with John B. Magruder and George Washington Custis Lee (son of Robert E. Lee), both men later to be generals in the Confederate States Army, on April 21, 1861—the day before Robert E. Lee left Washington, D.C., to join the rebel armies. This left Tayloe in charge of a secret espionage ring in the city, it is claimed. Tayloe may also have helped provide funds to Confederate prisoners housed at the Old Capitol Prison in the city. It is even claimed that Tayloe may have helped conceive the kidnapping plot which later became a plan to kill President Lincoln.

Secretary of State William H. Seward lived in the house next door to Tayloe's. Seward was almost assassinated on the night of April 14, 1865, by Lewis Powell. Tayloe and his wife were the first people to enter the Seward house after the attack, and they stayed with the stricken Secretary of State all night long.

== Death and estate ==
Tayloe, his wife, and his son, Edward, left for an extended tour of Europe on May 16, 1866, touring England, Spain, France, Germany, Prussia, and Italy. The family arrived in Rome in January 1868. Edward returned to the United States, and after his departure Tayloe began to experience weakness (but did not seem seriously ill). He became paralyzed on February 25, 1868, and died a few hours later.

Phoebe Tayloe inherited the house upon his death. After she died in 1881, more than 200 marble statues, bronze sculptures, fine furniture, and paintings in the house were donated to the Corcoran Gallery of Art.

== Ancestry ==
Ancestors of Benjamin Ogle Tayloe

16. William Tayloe (the nephew)
8. Col John Tayloe I
17. Ann Corbin
4. Col John Tayloe II
18. David Gwynn
9. Elizabeth Gwynn
19. Kathrine Griffin
2. Col John Tayloe III
20. George Plater I
10. George Plater II
21. Ann Rousby Burford
5. Rebecca Plater Tayloe
22. Colonel Thomas A. Addison, I
11. Rebecca Addison Bowles
23. Elizabeth Tasker
1. Benjamin Ogle Tayloe
24. Samuel Ogle
12. Samuel Ogle
25. Ursula Markham
6. Benjamin Ogle
26. Benjamin Tasker Sr.
13. Anne Tasker
27. Ann Bladen
3. Ann Ogle
28. Joseph Hill
14. Henry Hill
29. Sarah Richardson
7. Henrietta Margaret Hill
30. Philip Thomas
15. Mary Thomas
31. Ann Chew

== Bibliography ==
- Adams, Katherine H. and Keene, Michael L. Alice Paul and the American Suffrage Campaign. Urbana, Ill.: University of Illinois Press, 2008.
- Apkarian-Russell, Pamela. Washington's Haunted Past: Capital Ghosts of America. Charleston, S.C.: The History Press, 2006.
- Bendar, Michael J. L' Enfant's Legacy: Public Open Spaces in Washington, D.C. Baltimore, Md.: Johns Hopkins University Press, 2006.
- Bowers, Claude Gernade. The Party Battles of the Jackson Period. New York: Houghton Mifflin Company, 1922.
- Burlingame, Michael. With Lincoln in the White House: Letters, Memoranda, and Other Writings of John G. Nicolay, 1860–1865. Carbondale, Ill.: SIU Press, 2006.
- Carrier, Thomas J. Washington D.C.: A Historical Walking Tour. Charleston, S.C.: Arcadia Publishers, 1999.
- Coclanis, Peter A. The Atlantic Economy During the Seventeenth and Eighteenth Centuries: Organization, Operation, Practice, and Personnel. Columbia, S.C.: University of South Carolina Press, 2005.
- Cohen, Daniel. Civil War Ghosts. New York: Scholastic Inc., 1999.
- Dix, John A. Memoirs of John Adams Dix. New York: Harper & Brothers, 1883.
- Evelyn, Douglas E; Dickson, Paul; and Ackerman, S.J. On This Spot: Pinpointing the Past in Washington, D.C. Sterling, Va.: Capital Books, 2008.
- "Events Subsequent to the Contract As a Defence to Specific Performance." Columbia Law Review. May 1916.
- Fiehler, Leonard E. and Baltz, Shirley. "National Register of Historic Places Inventory – Nomination Form: Belair Mansion." United States Department of the Interior. National Park Service. 1976.
- Gallagher, Gary W. Three Days at Gettysburg: Essays on Confederate and Union Leadership. Kent, Ohio: Kent State University Press, 1999.
- Goode, James M. Capital Losses: A Cultural History of Washington's Destroyed Buildings. 2d ed. Washington, D.C.: Smithsonian Institution, 2003.
- Hardy, Stella Pickett. Colonial Families of the Southern States of America: A History and Genealogy of Colonial Families Who Settled in the Colonies Prior to the Revolution. New York: Wright, 1911.
- Hogarth, Paul. Walking Tours of Old Washington and Alexandria. McLean, Va.: EPM Publications, 1985.
- Jarvis, J.F. Trolley Trips In and About Fascinating Washington. Washington, D.C.: J.F. Jarvis, 1900.
- Latimer, Louise Payson. Your Washington and Mine. New York: C. Scribner's Sons, 1924.
- Lockwood, Mary S. Historic Homes in Washington: Its Noted Men and Women. New York: Belford Co., 1889.
- McCue, George. The Octagon: Being An Account of a Famous Washington Residence, Its Great Years, Decline & Restoration. Washington, D.C.: American Institute of Architects Foundation, 1976.
- Moeller, Gerard Martin and Weeks, Christopher. AIA Guide to the Architecture of Washington, D.C. Baltimore, Md.: Johns Hopkins University Press, 2006.
- Oppel, Frank and Meisel, Tony. Washington, D.C.: A Turn-of-the-Century Treasury. Secaucus, N.J.: Castle, 1987.
- "Plantation Houses of the Alabama Canebrake and Their Associated Outbuildings, 181-1942." National Register of Historic Places Database. National Park Service. United States Department of the Interior. February 12, 1993. Accessed 2010-05-18.
- Poolman, Kenneth. Guns Off Cape Ann: The Story of the Shannon and the Chesapeake. Chicago: Rand McNally, 1962.
- Rhodes, James F. History of the United States: From the Compromise of 1850 to the McKinley-Bryan Campaign of 1896. Paperback ed. New York: Cosimo Classics, 2009.
- Scarborough, William Kauffman. Masters of the Big House: Elite Slaveholders of the Mid-Nineteenth-Century South. Baton Rouge: Louisiana State University Press, 2006.
- Sellers, James Benson. Slavery in Alabama. Birmingham, Ala.: University of Alabama Press, 1950.
- Smith, Hal H. "Historic Washington Homes." Records of the Columbia Historical Society, Washington. 1908.
- "Some Notes From 'The Memorial of Benjamin Ogle Tayloe'." Tyler's Quarterly Historical and Genealogical Magazine. October 1920.
- Taylor, John M. William Henry Seward: Lincoln's Right Hand. Washington, D.C.: Potomac Books, 2005.
- Tindall, William. Standard History of the City of Washington From a Study of the Original Sources. Knoxville, Tenn.: H.W. Crew & Co., 1914.
- Tidwell, William A. April '65: Confederate Covert Action in the American Civil War. Kent, Ohio: Kent State University Press, 1995.
- Tidwell, William A; Hall, James O; and Gaddy, David Winfred. Come Retribution: The Confederate Secret Service and the Assassination of Lincoln. Jackson, Miss.: University Press of Mississippi, 1988.
- Walther, Eric H. The Shattering of the Union: America in the 1850s. New York: Rowman & Littlefield, 2004.
- Warfield, Joshua Dorsey. The Founders of Anne Arundel And Howard Counties, Maryland. Baltimore, Md.: Kohn & Pollock, 1905.
- Watson, Winslow Marston. In Memoriam: Benjamin Ogle Tayloe. Philadelphia: Sherman & Co., 1872.
- Willard v. Tayloe, 75 U.S. 557 (1869).
- Willard, Henry Kellogg. "Henry Augustus Willard: His Life and Times." Records of the Columbia Historical Society. 1917.
