= Blackballing =

Rejection via secret ballot

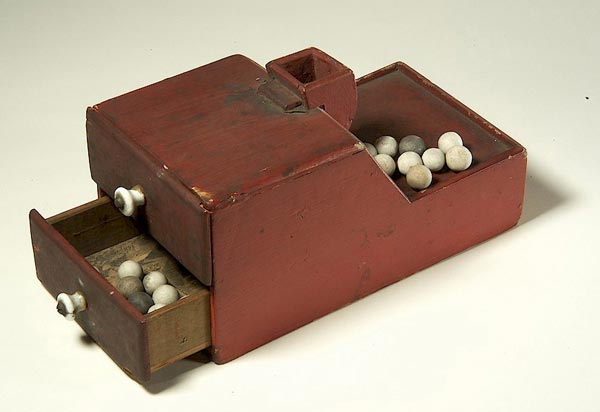
One of the earliest American ballot boxes using ballottas. This ballot box was used by members of the Association of the Oldest Inhabitants of the District of Columbia, a social club.

Blackballing is a rejection in a traditional form of secret ballot, where a white ball or ballot constitutes a vote in support and a black ball signifies opposition. The system is commonly used where an organization's rules provide that one or two objections, rather than a percentage of the vote (for example, more than 50%), are sufficient to defeat a proposition. Since the seventeenth century, these rules have commonly applied to elections to membership of many gentlemen's clubs and similar institutions such as Masonic lodges and fraternities.

The principle of such election rules in a club is that it tends to preserve the current ethos of the club by ensuring that candidates are congenial to (almost) all the existing members. As a public difference of opinions could be divisive, the election is secret.

In America, members of fraternal clubs often voted at their meetings without paper ballots as early as the 17th century. In order to progress, votes had to be unanimous in nature, as a single vote against was enough to apply veto. A blackball box was used instead of paper ballots for this reason.

== Process ==
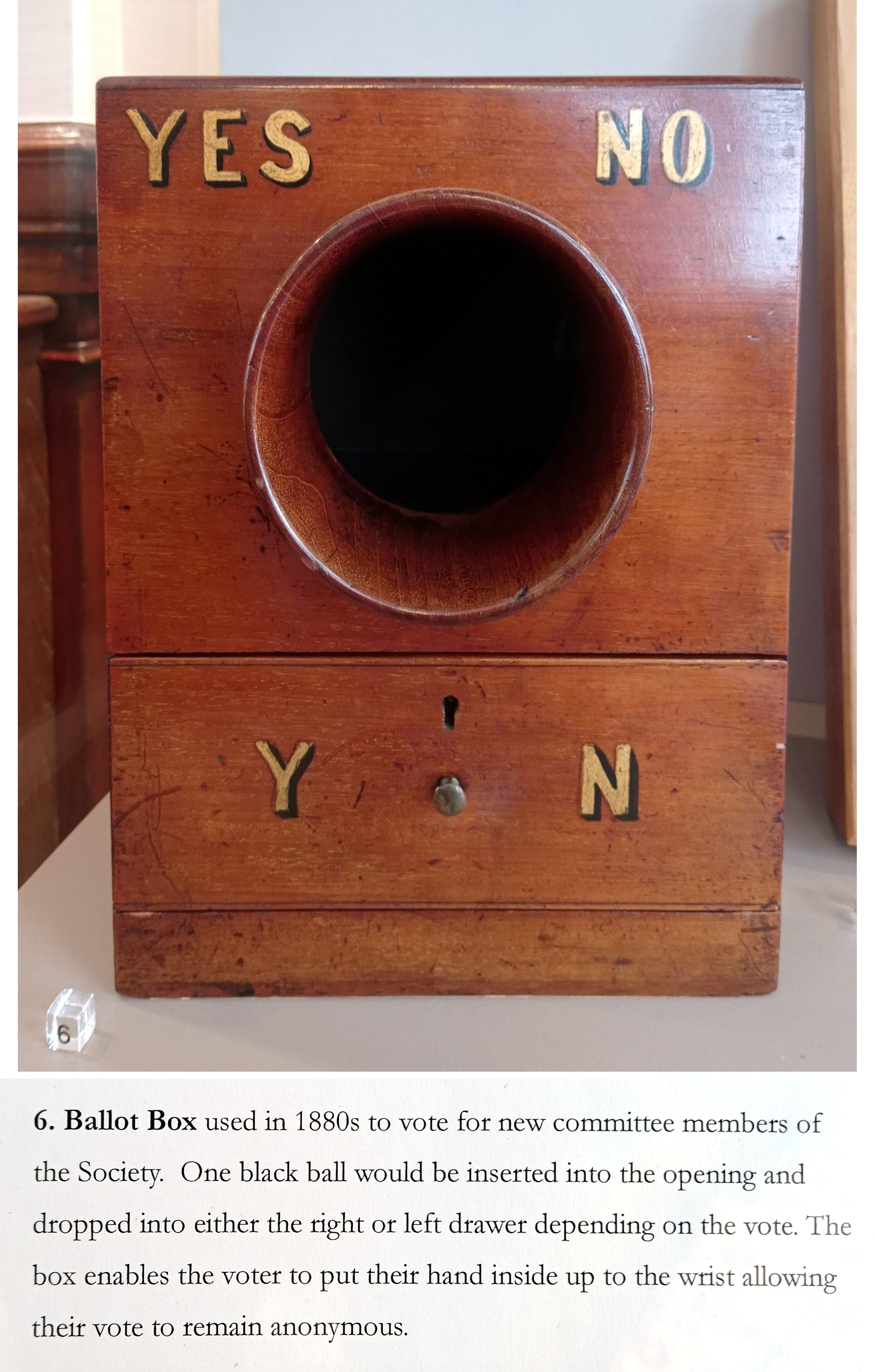
Royal Philatelic Society London committee voting box 1880s that used black balls to allow a secret veto of candidates

A large supply of black and white balls is provided for voters. Each voter audibly casts a single ball into the ballot box under cover of the box, or of a combination of a cloth and the box itself, so that observers can see who votes but not how they are voting. When all voting is complete, the box is opened and the balls displayed: all present can immediately see the result, without any means of knowing which members are objecting.

The number of votes in support is often irrelevant, except to prove a quorum. Whilst in many such cases even a single black ball will be fatal to the election, rules in larger clubs ensure that a single member cannot exercise a veto to the detriment of the future of the club. For example, two black balls are required to exclude; a limited category or committee of members vote, rather than all members; or in the event of a blackball, the election may be repeated immediately to ensure that there is no mistake, or after a fixed period to allow further information or opinions to be discussed discreetly. A variant sometimes used is that all incoming candidates are voted on as a group; if the group as a whole is blackballed, then each member must be voted on individually.

The practice also found popularity in areas outside of social clubs. In the Soviet Union, dissertation panels would typically cast their vote on a thesis defense using this system.

Robert's Rules of Order notes that the use of black and white balls can be ordered by passing an incidental motion to that effect. The manual notes, "This custom, however, is apparently declining."

The term still remains in use for many different electoral systems which have applied from club to club and from time to time: for example, instead of differently coloured balls, ballot-balls may be dropped into separate "yes" or "no" drawers inside the ballot box.

In some Masons' lodges, a black cube is used instead of a black ball.

== An example ==
The following example from the rules of election to the Travellers Club, which is quoted from Dickens's Dictionary of London (1879), provides an illustration of the principle:

The members elect by ballot. When 12 and under 18 members ballot, one black ball, if repeated, shall exclude; if 18 and upwards ballot, two black balls exclude, and the ballot cannot be repeated. The presence of 12 members is necessary for a ballot.
