= The Octagon House =

Historic house in Washington, D.C., US

- U.S. National Register of Historic Places
- U.S. National Historic Landmark
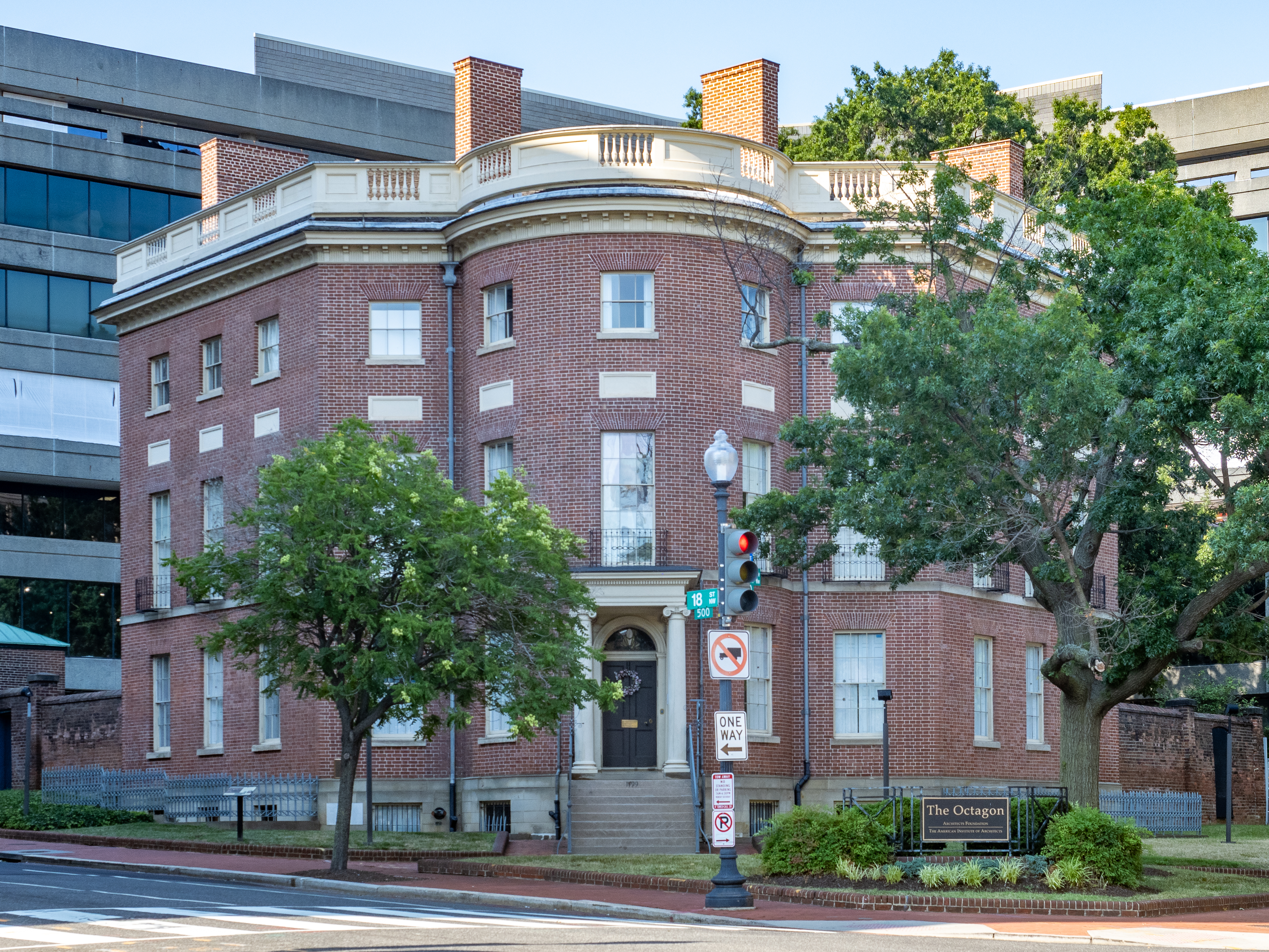
- The Octagon House in 2024

- Location within Central Washington, D.C. Location within the District of Columbia Location within the United States
- Location: 1799 New York Avenue, Northwest, Washington, D.C., U.S.
- Coordinates: 38°53′46.68″N 77°2′29.40″W
- Built: 1799; 227 years ago
- Architect: William Thornton
- Architectural style: Federal
- NRHP reference No.: 66000863

Significant dates
- Added to NRHP: October 15, 1966
- Designated NHL: December 19, 1960

The Octagon House, also known as the Colonel John Tayloe III House, is a house located at 1799 New York Avenue, Northwest in the Foggy Bottom neighborhood of Washington, D.C. It was built in 1799 for John Tayloe III, the wealthiest planter in the country, at the behest of his new family member George Washington, as his sister Sarah Tayloe married William Augustine Washington, son of Gen. Washington's half brother Augustine Washington Jr. In September 1814, after British forces burnt the White House during the War of 1812, Tayloe, for six months, lent the Octagon House to United States president James Madison and first lady Dolley Madison to serve as the Executive Mansion. It is one of only seven houses to serve as the presidential residence in the history of the United States of America, and one of only three, along with the White House and Blair House, that still stand.

John Tayloe III was born at Mount Airy, which he later inherited. The colonial estate was built by his father, John Tayloe II, on the north bank of the Rappahannock River across from Tappahannock, Virginia. By this time, it was the centerpiece of a roughly 60,000 acre department of interdependent plantation farms known as the Mount Airy department, located approximately one hundred miles south of Washington, D.C., in Richmond County, Virginia. He was educated at Eton and Christ's College, Cambridge University in England, served in the Virginia state legislature, and ran unsuccessfully for Congress in 1800.

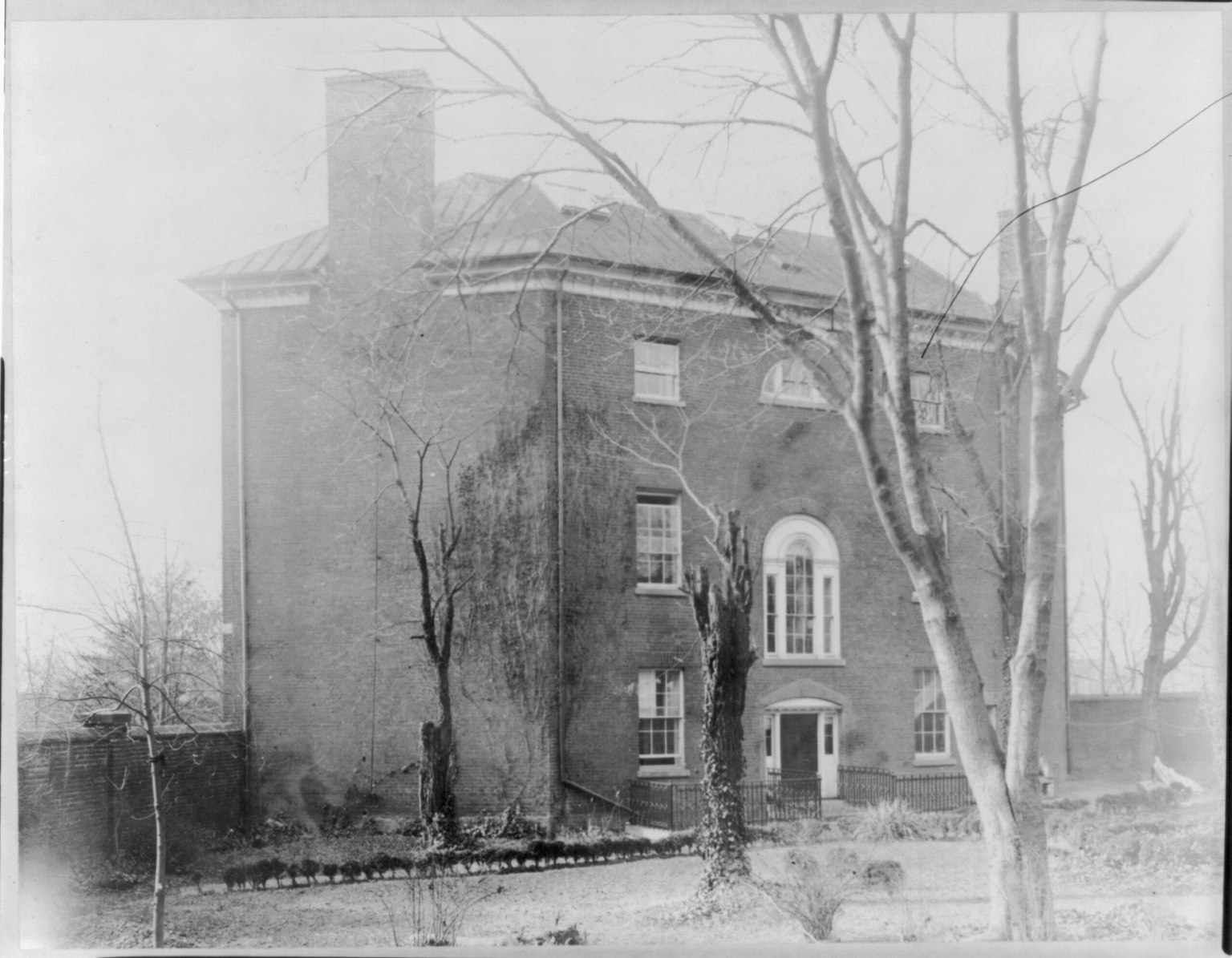
Rear view, 1913

John Tayloe III married Ann Ogle, daughter of Benjamin Ogle and granddaughter to Samuel Ogle of Ogle Hall in Annapolis, Maryland, in 1792 at her family's country home Belair Mansion. Ann was only a year younger than her husband. Tayloe was reputed to be the richest Virginian planter of his time, and built the house in Washington at the suggestion of George Washington on land purchased from Gustavus W. Scott or Benjamin Stoddert, first Secretary of the Navy. The Octagon was originally constructed to be a winter residence for the Tayloe family, but they lived in the house year-round from 1818 to 1855. The Octagon property originally included a number of outbuildings, including a smokehouse, laundry, stables, carriage house, slave quarters, and an ice house (the only surviving outbuilding). The Tayloes were involved in shipbuilding, horse breeding and racing, and owned several iron foundries—they were fairly diversified for a plantation family. The Tayloes enslaved hundreds of people, and had between 12 and 18 who worked at the Octagon. Since the 1960s when it was designated a National Historic Landmark, it has served as a house museum, meeting and event space, operated by the American Institute of Architects Foundation.

== History ==
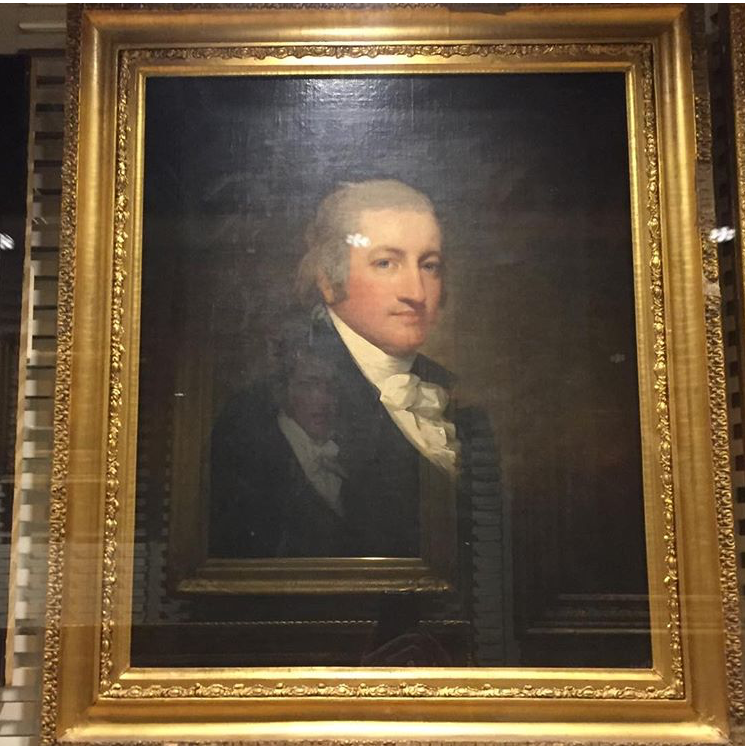
A portrait of John Tayloe III by Gilbert Stuart, now housed at the Metropolitan Museum of Art in New York City

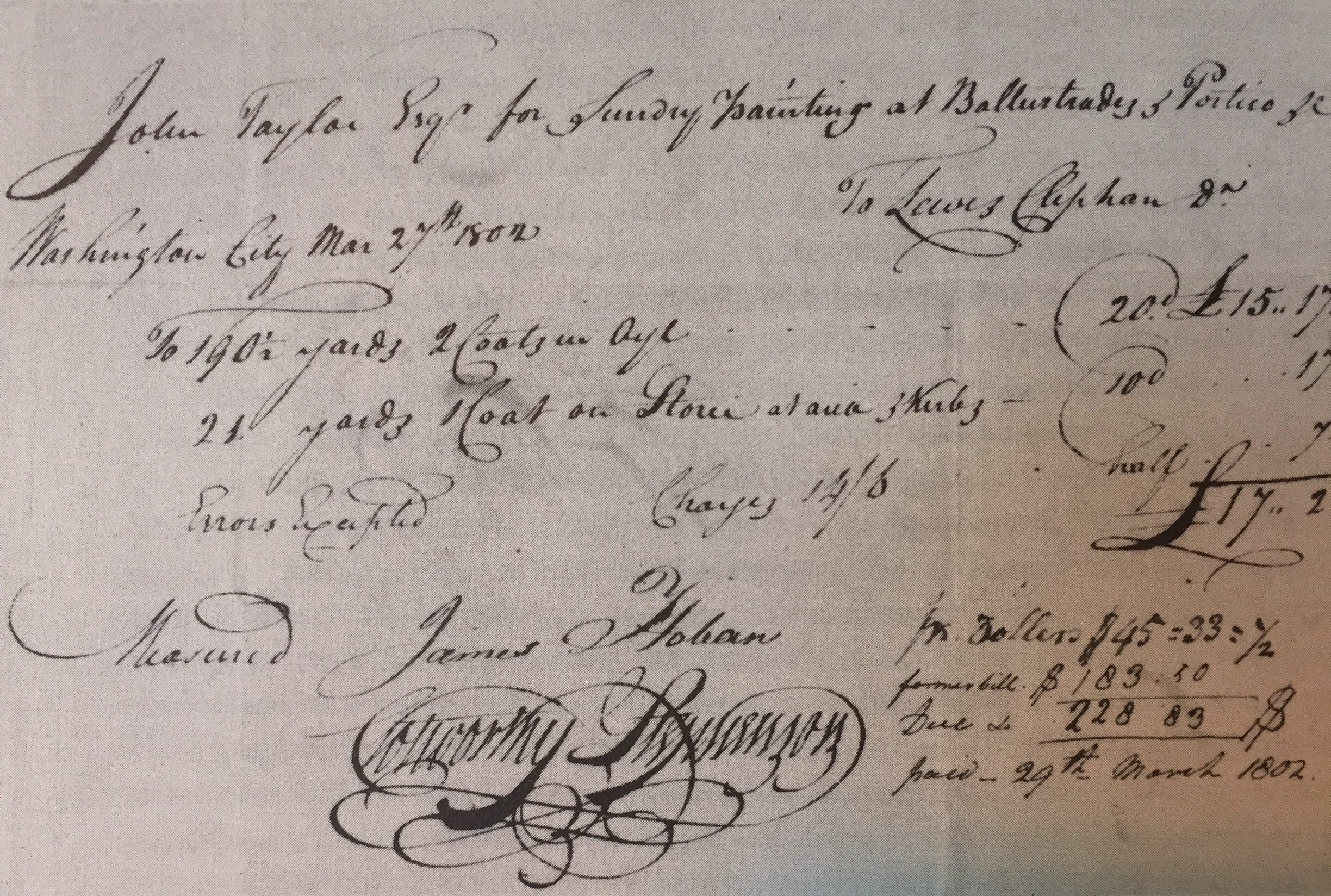
Invoice dated March 27, 1802 and signed by James Hoban for Sunday's painting of the Octagon

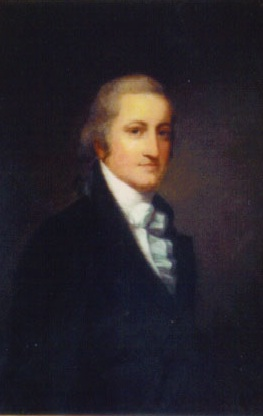
John Tayloe III depicted in a reproduction of Gilbert Stuart's original portrait by Thomas Sully

=== John Tayloe III ===
John and Anne (Ogle) Tayloe were considering Philadelphia as a place to build a town house, since Baltimore and Philadelphia were the nearest metropolitan centers to Mount Airy. George Washington, whose half-brother Augustine Washington Jr.'s son, Capt William Augustine Washington married Tayloe's sister, Sarah 'Sally' Tayloe, on May 11, 1799, found out and persuaded the Tayloes to build their house in the new capital city in an outlying section. The plan was to establish a node of development to stimulate fill-in growth. Col. Tayloe had been considering building his new home in Philadelphia under the expert hands of architect Benjamin Latrobe. Instead, he chose the primitive wilds of the new federal city and the architect William Thornton, the man who designed the new United States Capitol with the help of James Hoban, who was awarded the job of designing the White House. Tayloe went with the wishes of George Washington.

On April 19, 1797, Tayloe paid $1,000 (~$23,929 in 2025) to Gustavus W. Scott for lot 8 in Square 170, at the corner of New York Avenue and 18th Street NW, as laid out in a plan of the city by Pierre Charles L'Enfant and surveyed by Andrew Ellicott. Scott was one of the first purchasers of lots in the newly platted capital. The lot was in open country west of the partly built President's House, about 1 mi. from Georgetown, and about .5 mi. northeast of Hamburgh, which was absorbed into the new city plan. During this time he established the Washington Jockey Club's on a mile track which extended from the rear of what is now the site of Decatur House at H Street and Jackson Place, crossing 17th Street and Pennsylvania Avenue to 20th Street with Charles Carnan Ridgely, at the present site of the Eisenhower Executive Office Building.

On April 19, 1799, Dr. William Thornton wrote to George Washington, "Mr. J. Tayloe, of Virginia, has contracted to build a house in the City near the President's Square of $13,000 value." Thoronton was a self-trained architect who had won the United States Capitol competition. His first problem was to plan a house that would fit the lot, the south side of which was cut away on the bias by the diagonal of New York Avenue. If the house were built to face either of the bordering streets, it would be at an ungainly angle in relation to the other street, and outbuildings and wells had to be fitted in also. He dealt with the problem by relating the house equally to both streets, which put the two walls at a 70 degree angle from each other. The house actually has six sides, but was called "The Octagon" by the Tayloes. It had closets on every floor, an innovative feature for its time. The house is well built of brick trimmed with Aquia Creek sandstone. The lot is triangular and fenced in by a high brick wall. The kitchen, stable and outhouses are built of brick and accommodated a large number of both enslaved people and horses. The interior is elaborately finished, the doors of the first story being of mahogany. All the work in the circular vestibule coincides with the circumference of the tower, the doors, sash and glass being made on the circle. The parlor mantle is made of a fine cement composition painted white. The remains of gold leaf show in some of the relieved portions. Leading into the back hall and dining-room are two secret doors in which the washboards and chairboards run across the door, being ingeniously cut some distance from the actual door, no key holes, hinges or openings showing on the blind side. The knobs and shutter-buttons are of brass and evidently of a special pattern.

The Tayloes had 15 children, 13 of whom survived to adulthood (2 died in infancy: Anne, born and died in 1800, and Lloyd, born 1815, died 1816). The children were all born between 1793 and 1815. The oldest son, John Tayloe IV, served in the US Navy during the War of 1812 aboard the USS Constitution. His early death in 1824 was possibly connected to wounds received during the war. His parents provided for his wife and child after his death. Edward Thornton Tayloe, George Plater Tayloe and Henry Augustine Tayloe were all born at the Octagon.

=== The War of 1812 and temporary presidential residence ===
John Tayloe III was a Federalist, and not terribly supportive of President James Madison and the war with England that began in 1812, but he was active in the Virginia militia and commanded a regiment of DC cavalry. When British forces marched into Washington in August 1814, there was a French Flag flying outside the Octagon. Ann Ogle Tayloe had offered the house to the French consul, in the hopes of sparing the house from being burnt, who was occupying the house when the British arrived in the city. The house probably would have been spared even if it hadn't been effectively a "diplomatic residence", since the British were under strict orders not to damage private property. When First Lady Dolley Madison fled the city as the British approached, she sent her pet parrot to the French consulate at the Octagon for safekeeping.

President James Madison and his wife, Dolley moved into the Octagon on September 8, 1814, after the burning of the White House by British forces. President Madison ratified the Treaty of Ghent, which ended the War of 1812, in the upstairs study at the Octagon on February 17, 1815. Dolley was also known to throw parties on Wednesday nights known as 'squeezes' while in the Octagon. The Tayloes received $500 in rent for the Madisons' 6-month residency at the Octagon.

=== 1815–1960s ===
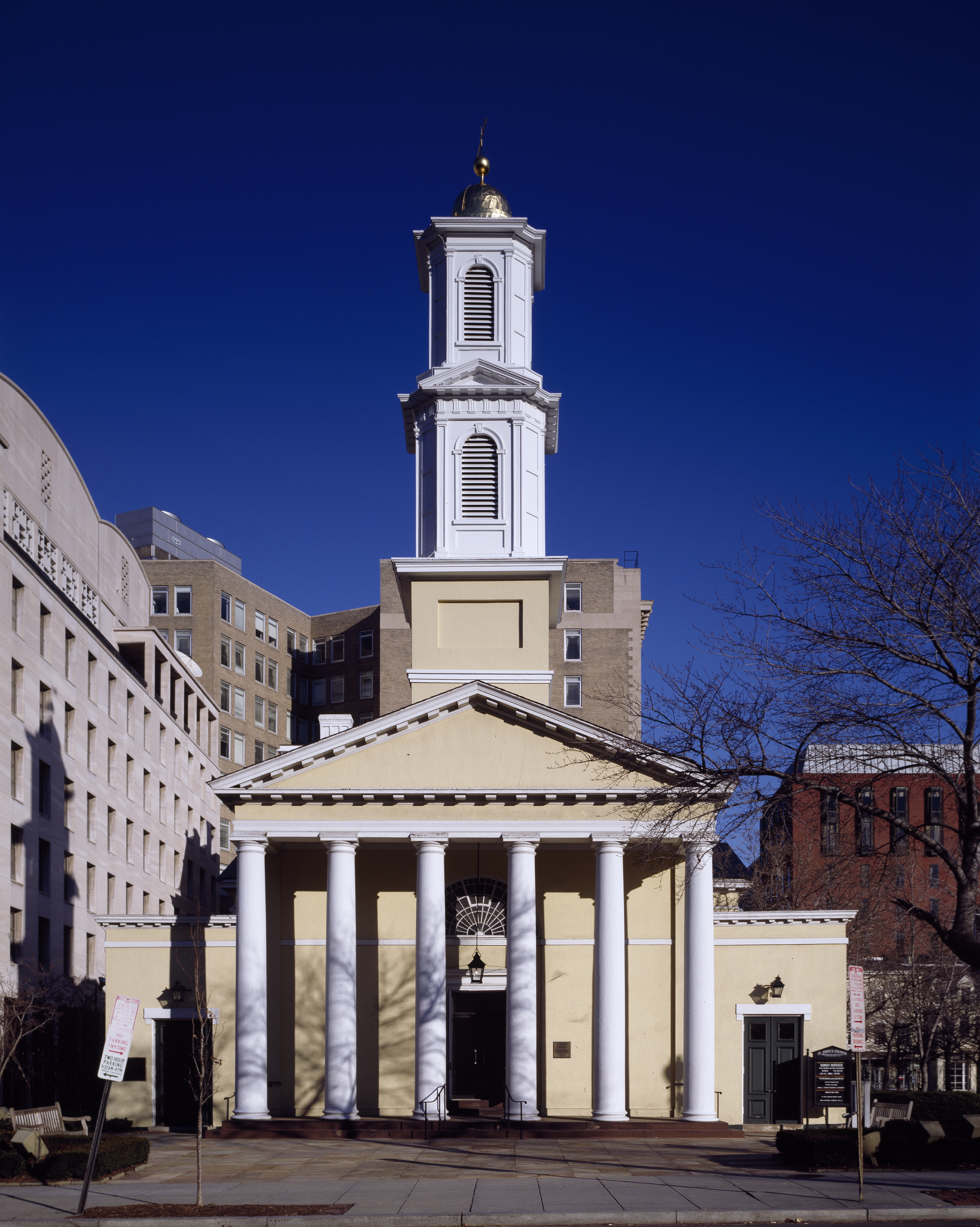
St. John's Episcopal Church, Lafayette Square, where John Tayloe III served as organizer, trustee, and vestryman

While a resident of Washington, Tayloe helped found and organize St. John's Episcopal Church, Lafayette Square in 1814, served as a trustee in 1816 during its construction and upon completion served on the vestry and donated to the parish a communion service of silver, which Bishop William Meade, in his work on the old Churches of Virginia, says had been purchased by Colonel Tayloe at a sale of the effects of the Lunenburg Parish Church in Richmond County, Virginia, to prevent its desecration for secular use.

Killian K. Van Rensselaer, American lawyer and Federalist politician who served in the United States Congress as a Representative from the state of New York dined at The Octagon House. "Another invitation recalls one of General Washington's closest friends, whom he persuaded to become a resident of Washington in its infancy, and who built the spacious mansion on the corner of New York Ave and Eighteenth Street, which is one of the surviving relics of the primitive city, not having been destroyed by the British in 1814, Colonel Tayloe: "Mr. Tayloe requests the favor of Mr. Van Rensselaer to dine with him on Sat next at 4 o'clock. The favour of an answer is requested. Wed 9th feb.""

John Tayloe III died in 1828 while staying at the Octagon. Ann Ogle Tayloe lived in the Octagon until her death in 1855. Both John and Ann were buried at Mount Airy. After Ann's death, the Tayloe children began renting out the house. It was rented to a girls' school in the 1860s, and the Federal government in the 1870s, when it served as office space for the Hydrographic Office of the U.S. Navy. By the 1880s, the house was occupied by 10 families, probably one living in each room, tenement-apartment-style. The residents were probably mostly workers in the factories that populated Foggy Bottom.

In 1898, the American Institute of Architects (AIA) selected the Octagon to be their new national headquarters. They rented the building for 4 years, and then purchased it outright in 1902. Under president of the AIA, D. Everett Waid, in 1927, "A scheme was approved to preserve the Octagon’s smokehouse and stables and to build offices and a library" behind the existing Octagon House but the construction was delayed until 1940 after Waid donated $300,000 to the AIA to commence the work largely to Waid's design specifications. The Octagon would continue to serve as AIA's headquarters until the construction of the current headquarters building in the 1960s.

== Museum ==
The Octagon opened as a museum in 1970. The museum was restored to its 1817–18 era appearance in the early 1990s. The wall colors and room configurations seen today are representative of that time period. The museum was administered by the American Architectural Foundation from 1970 to 2012, though the museum was closed from 2007 through 2013. The museum is administered by the American Institute of Architects Foundation, and offers self-guided tours, permanent and changing exhibitions, public programming, and guided tours by appointment.

It was declared a National Historic Landmark in 1960.

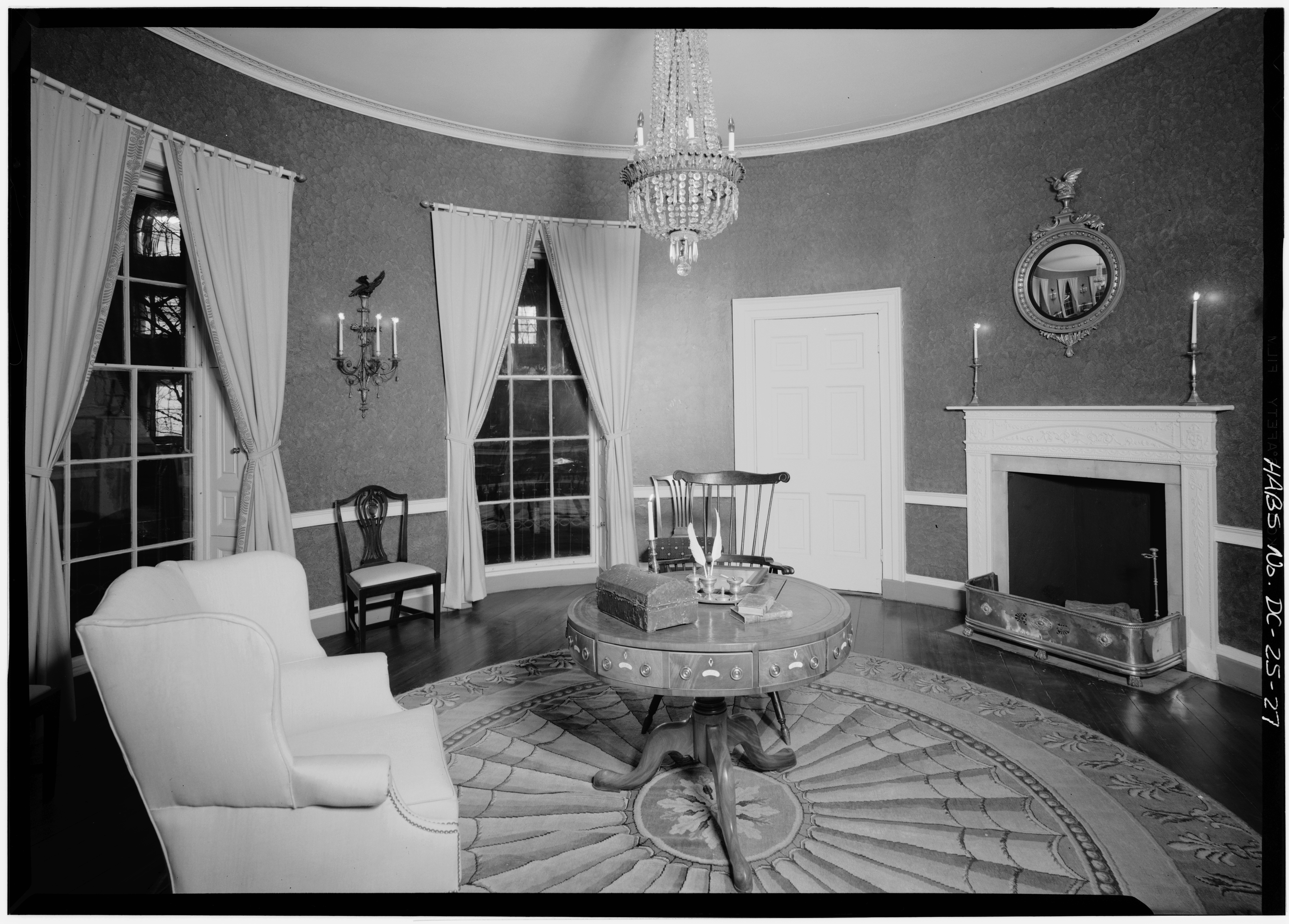
Interior, second floor, Treaty Room, looking west (circa 1933)

The museum is currently owned and operated by the Architects Foundation and is open to the public Fridays 11 am–4 pm and the first and third Saturdays 11 am–4 pm. The space hosts various public programs, educational tours, rotating exhibits, and special events.

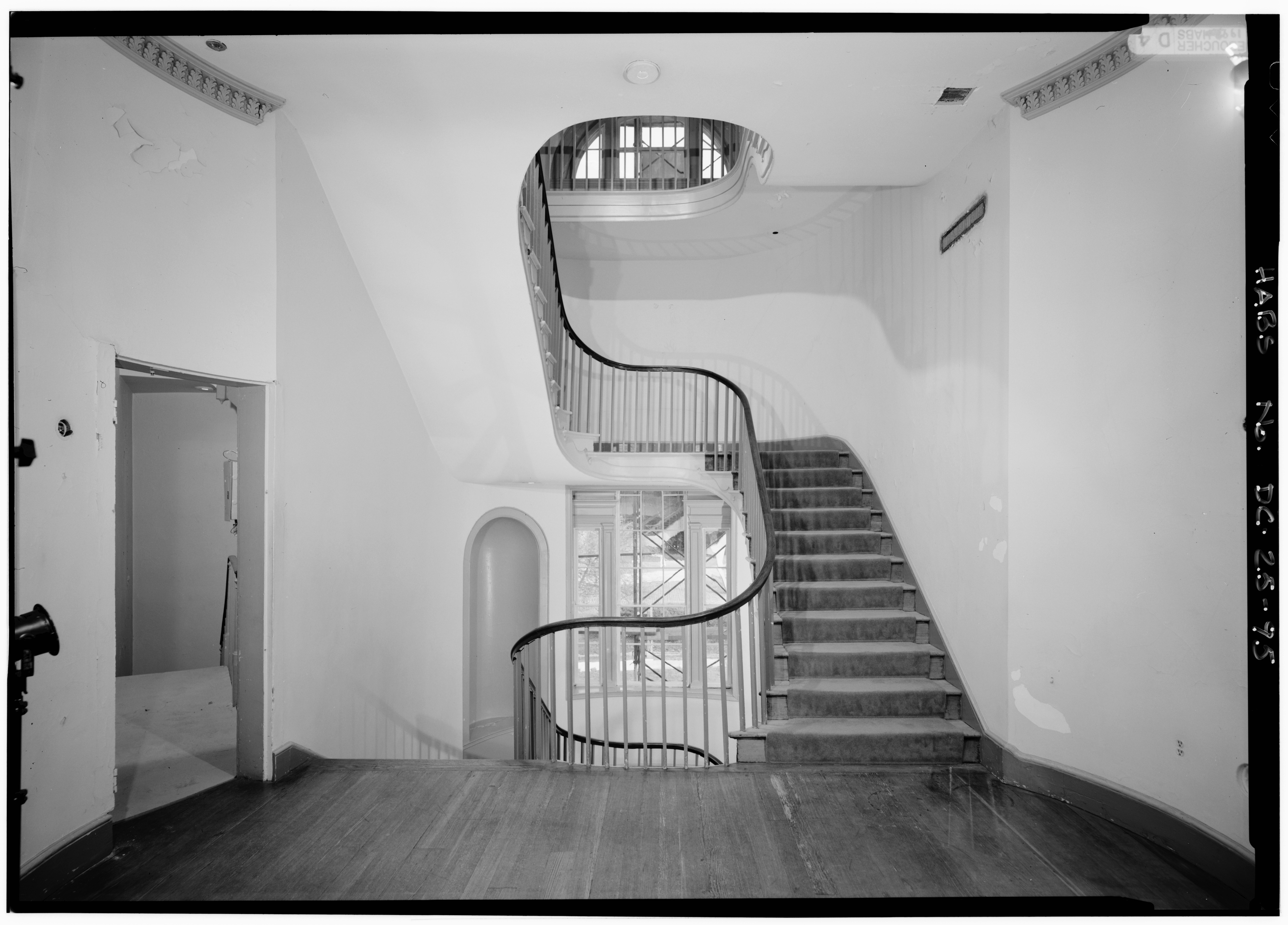
Second floor stair hall

== Architectural details ==
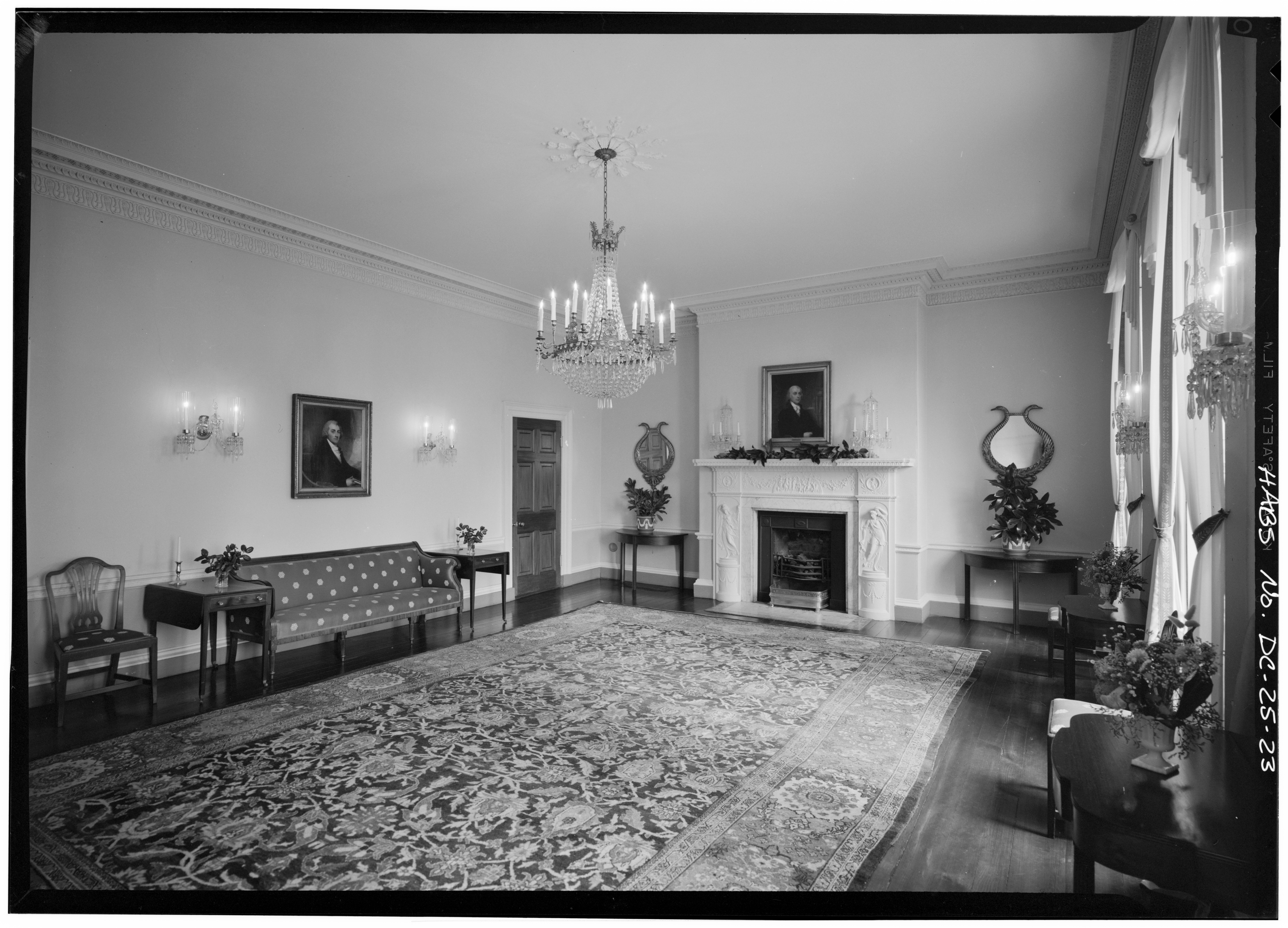
Interior, first floor, east room (circa 1933)

The three-story brick house, adapted to an irregular-shaped lot, displays a dramatic break with the traditional, late Georgian and early Federal house planning that preceded it. The Octagon achieves a zenith in Federal architecture in the United States, through a plan which combines a circle, two rectangles, and a triangle, and through the elegance and restraint of the interior and exterior decoration. The Coade stone, stoves, other decorative elements, and furniture were imported from England. The construction materials, such as bricks, timber, iron, and Aquia Creek sandstone were all manufactured locally.

The reason behind the naming of the six-sided building as the Octagon is unknown. Though the main room is a circle, one possibility is that it resembled octagonal rooms common in England, which were also circles but called octagon salons because they were constructed of eight walls and then plastered heavily in the corners to make a circle. Another explanation is that the eight angles formed by the odd shape of the six walls are an old definition of an octagon.

== Alleged haunting ==
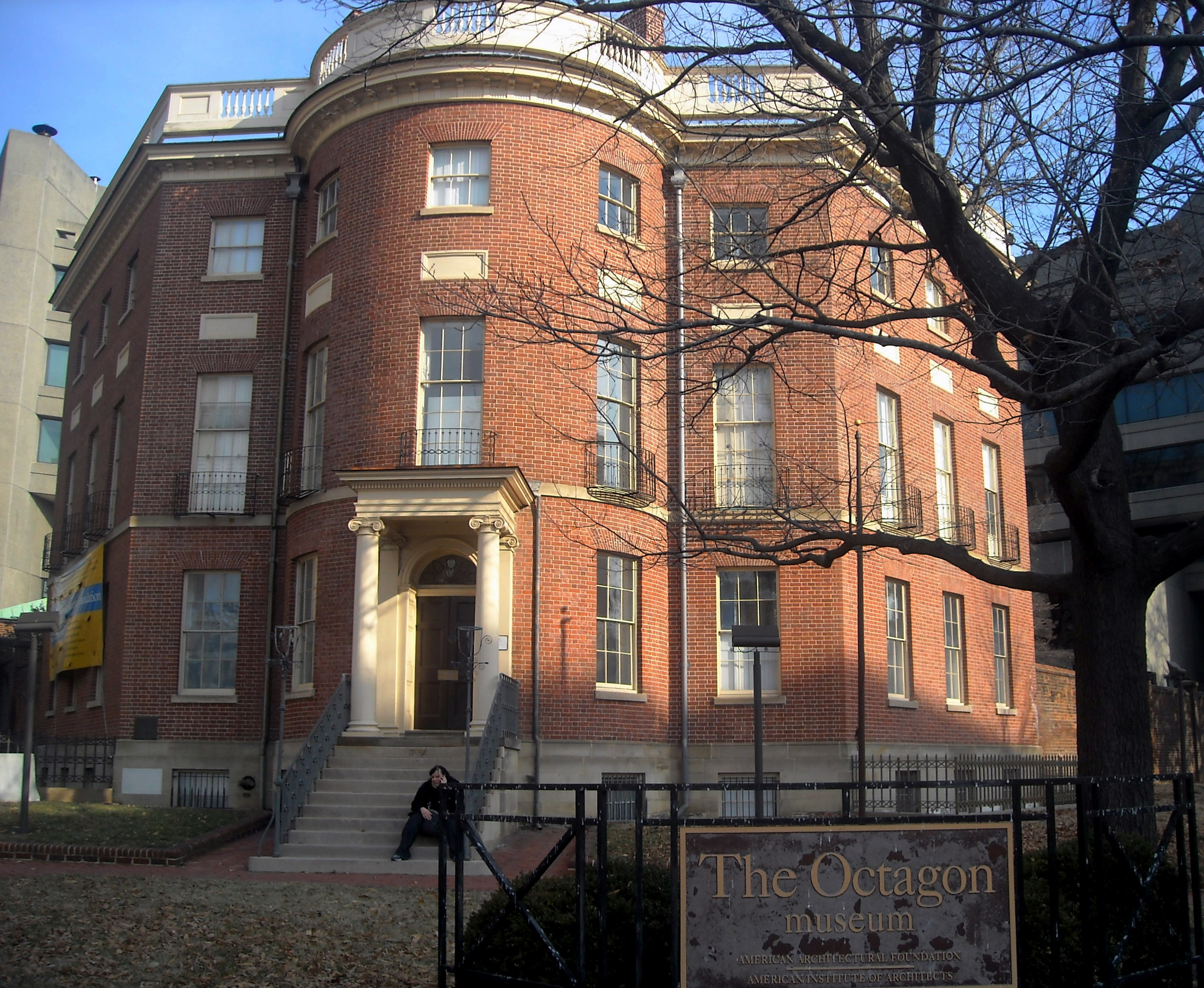
The Octagon is supposedly one of the most haunted buildings in Washington, D.C.

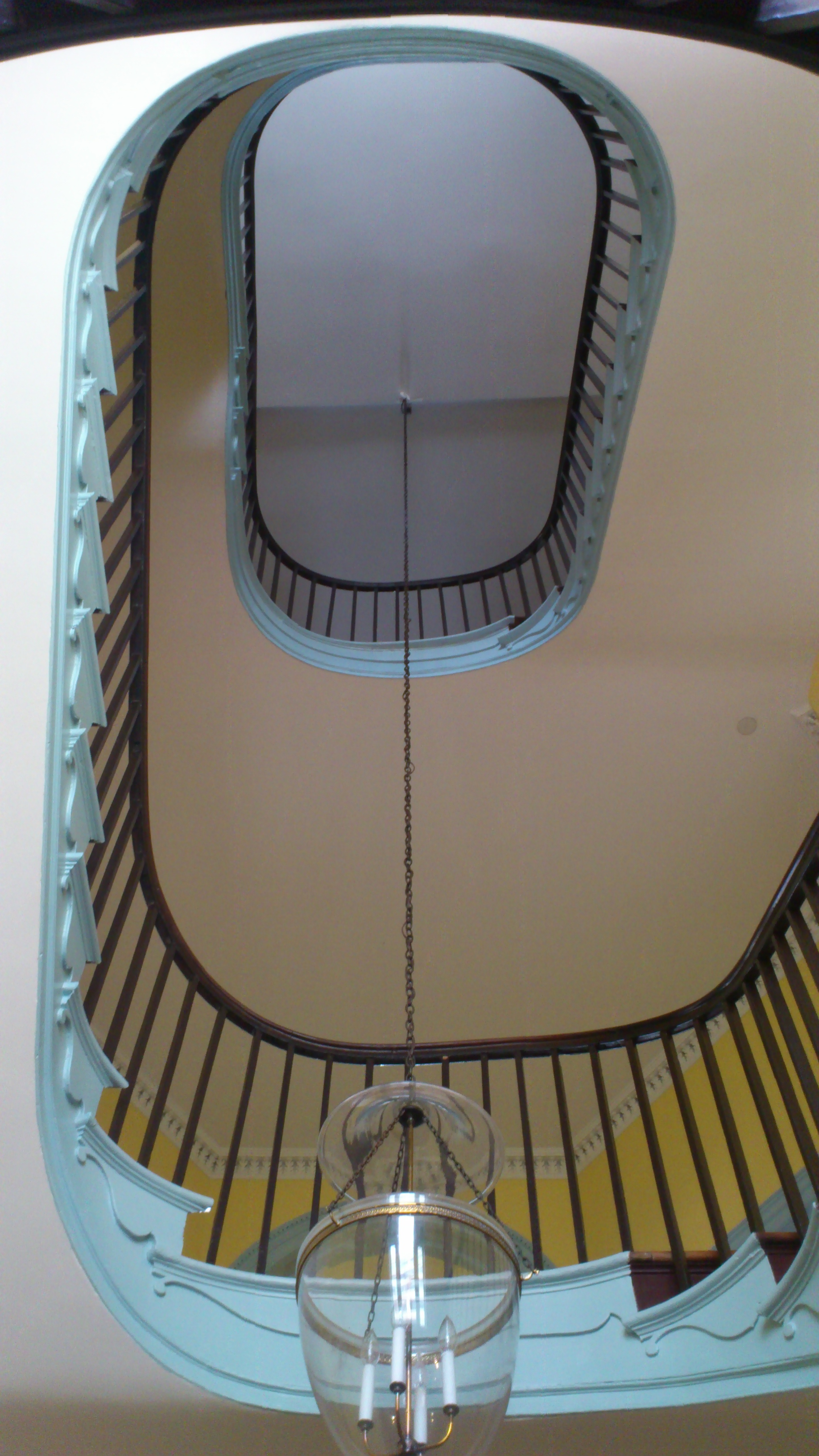
The Octagon's oval curved stairway

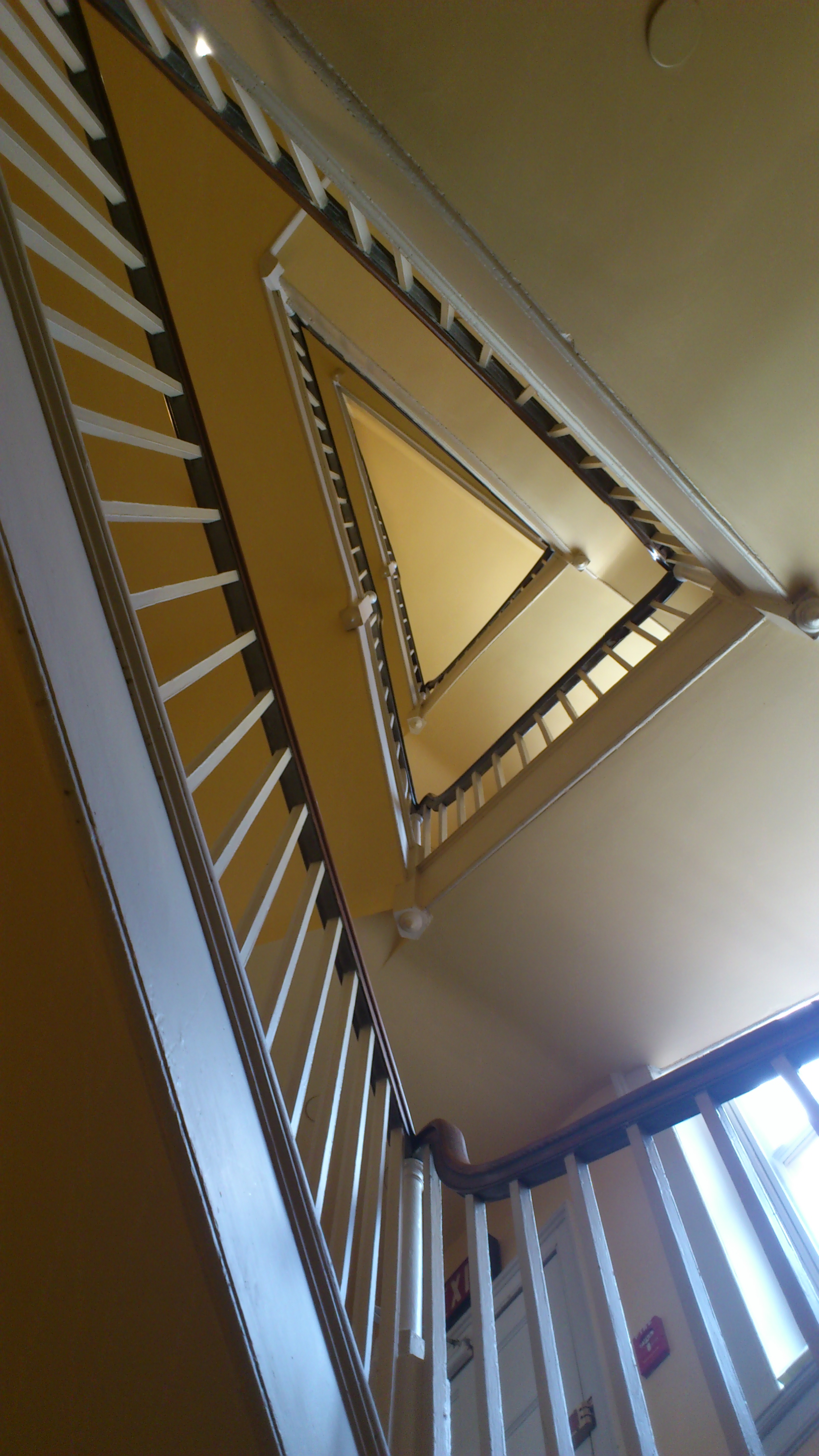
Angled service stairway

The Octagon House is purported to be one of the most haunted homes in Washington, D.C. Apparitions and the presence of otherworldly forces have reportedly been seen and felt in many places at The Octagon, including on the spiral staircase, the second floor landing, the third floor landing, the third floor bedroom, and the garden area in the rear. Among the eyewitnesses have been members of the public, curators, and other employees hired by the museum.

There are many variations of ghost stories that feature the Octagon House in Washington, D.C. As one of the oldest buildings in the city, it lends itself nicely as a setting for historical, spooky, and macabre tales. The stories recorded here are merely a presentation of a few of the reported experiences and legends that have evolved over the past 200 years, and should not be taken as historical fact.

=== Bells ===
The oldest of the Octagon's ghost legends is that of the mysterious ringing of the enslaved servants' call bells, just one of the legends linked to the African American people once enslaved there. When the house held bells to summon enslaved people, the spirits of the dead would announce their presence by ringing these bells loudly. The ghostly bell ringing is believed to have first occurred in the mid-1800s.

Virginia Tayloe Lewis, a granddaughter of John Tayloe III, grew up in the house and recorded this family memory in an unpublished manuscript: "The bells rang for a long time after my Grandfather Tayloe's death, and every one said that the house was haunted; the wires were cut and still they rang… Our dining room servant would come upstairs to ask if anyone rang the bell, and no one had."

An account by Marian Gouverneur, wife of Samuel Laurence Gouverneur Jr., the first American consul in Foo Chow in China, said that the General George D. Ramsay, Chief of Ordnance for the United States Army and commander of the Washington Arsenal in Washington, D.C., and his experience with the bells: "I have been told by the daughters of General George D. Ramsay that upon one occasion their father was requested by Colonel John Tayloe...to remain at the Octagon overnight, when we was obliged to be absent, as a protection to his daughters… While the members of the family were at the evening meal, the bells in the house began to ring violently. General Ramsay immediately arose from the table to investigate, but failed to unravel the mystery. The butler, in a state of great alarm, rushed into the dining-room and declared that it was the work of an unseen hand. As they continued to ring, General Ramsay held the rope which controlled the bells, but, it is said, they were not silenced."

By 1874 the bell legend was well established. Mary Clemmer Ames wrote about it: "It is an authenticated fact, that every night at the same hour, all the bells would ring at once. One gentleman, dining with Colonel Tayloe, when this mysterious ringing began, being an unbeliever in mysteries, and a very powerful man, jumped up and caught the bell wires in his hand, but only to be lifted bodily from the floor, while he was unsuccessful in stopping the ringing. Some declare that it was discovered, after a time, that rats were the ghosts who rung the bells; others, that the cause was never discovered, and that finally the family, to secure peace, were compelled to take the bells down and hang them in different fashion. Among other remedies, had been previously tried that of exorcism, but the prayers of the priest who had been summoned availed nought."

The service bells are no longer in the house and there are no reports of their continuing to ring today.

=== Dolley Madison ===
There are a number of ghostly legends at the Octagon that deal with its early history as a gathering place for the elite of Washington, D.C. Dolley Madison is prominent in these legends because she was well known as a hostess during the first quarter of the 19th century. She is a very popular ghost in Washington, D.C., and is said to haunt several buildings around town. Dolley and James Madison resided in the Octagon House from September 1814 through March 1815, after the White House was burned by the British.

According to the legends, ghostly receptions are held by Dolley Madison, who is supposedly most often seen in the front hall and drawing room, and the smell of lilacs is noticeable whenever her ghost is present.

=== Colonel Tayloe's daughters ===
By far the most intricate and popular of the legends connected with the Octagon is that of the deaths of the Tayloes' daughters. Variations of the legend are so well developed and circulated, that visitors to the house are often thoroughly convinced that they are based on fact. In reality, there is no documentation to support any of them.

The legend, which made its first appearance in a 1908 article run by the Minneapolis Tribune, has appeared on TV shows, and in numerous ghost books, and usually follows a story-line similar to this:

Two of Colonel Tayloe's daughters are said to haunt The Octagon. The first allegedly died before the War of 1812. Colonel Tayloe and his daughter quarreled on the second floor landing over the girl's relationship with a British officer stationed in the city. When the daughter turned in anger to go down the stairs, she fell down the stairs (or over the railing; stories differ) and died. Her specter is allegedly seen crumpled at the bottom of the steps or on the stairs near the second floor landing, and sometimes exhibits itself as the light of a candle moving up the staircase. The other death, stories claim, occurred in 1817 or shortly thereafter. Another of Colonel Tayloe's daughters eloped with a young man, incurring her father's wrath. When she returned home to reconcile with her father, they argued on the third-floor landing. This daughter, too, fell to her death down the stairs (or over the railing), and her shade is alleged to haunt the third floor landing and stairs between the second and third floors.

There is no historical evidence to support these stories. Nothing about the ghosts of the daughters appears before 1908, and none of the Tayloes' daughters died in the Octagon. Of the Tayloes' seven daughters, only three died before the age of 30. Of those, one died in 1800 at the age of one month (Ann Tayloe) and never lived in the Octagon. Rebecca Plater Tayloe died in 1815 at the age of 18, but at that time the Octagon was being rented by President Madison, and the Tayloe family was staying at their Mount Airy Plantation in Richmond County, VA. Sources state that the Tayloe family was "grief stricken by the loss through illness of their eighteen year old daughter Rebecca Plater while at Mount Airy". The next youngest of their surviving daughters to die was Elizabeth Mary Tayloe, who died in 1832 at the age of 26. She died in Washington, D.C., but not at the Octagon House. At the time of her death her father had been dead for four years and she had been married to her husband, Robert Wormeley Carter II, for some time. The four remaining daughters all died over the age of 38. For a complete list of the births and deaths of the Tayloe children, see the John Tayloe III page.

=== Other reports of ghostly activity ===
The Octagon was firmly established as a haunted house by 1888, when, it is reported, twelve men decided to spend a night in the house in order to expel the ghosts or prove the legends wrong. A first-hand account was printed in a local newspaper, and this was subsequently quoted or paraphrased in articles printed in 1892, 1934, 1941, 1950, and 1969. "The hours wore quietly on. The party were dispersed from garret to cellar. At the hour of midnight, as I and two others were crossing the threshold of a room on the second floor, three feminine shrieks rose from the center of the room. Aghast we stood. From all quarters the party rushed… Too brave to desert, yet cowards at heart, we watched the gray light of morning dawn, and each man of us thanked God his night among ghosts was past. After those screams our band was closely knit together… collectively we listened through the waning hours of night to the clanking of sabers and tramping of footfalls."

Museum superintendent Alric H. Clay claimed that in the 1960s spirits would often turn on the lights and open The Octagon's doors late at night.

In the late 1940s, a doctor who had made a house call to the Octagon had a strange encounter on the stairway. Caretaker James Cyprus had summoned the physician for his ailing wife. The doctor was preparing to leave when he mustered up enough courage to ask Cyprus if there was a costume party going on that evening. When Cyprus told him that there wasn't, the doctor looked perplexed and told him of encountering a man on the stairs just a few moments before who had been dressed in a military uniform of the early 1800s.

A gambler shot to death in the home's third-floor bedroom in the late 19th century has been reportedly seen in the room in which he died. A 1912 newspaper article related the story of a man who had stayed for a month in a room in the Octagon which he claimed was visited nightly by the spirit of a man who was killed over a card game held in the room.

There are numerous reports of occurrences in the Octagon that were supposedly caused by the household ghosts. The sound of rustling silk is said to be heard on the main staircase, the hanging lamp in the main hallway allegedly swings by itself, there is a spot at the foot of the main staircase that some people feel they are forced to avoid, and one curator is reported to have found the "tiptoeing tracks of human feet in the undisturbed dust of the top floor landing".

== See also ==
- Benjamin Ogle Tayloe House, the Tayloe mansion built on Lafayette Square
- Benjamin Ogle Tayloe, buildier of said house on Lafayette Square
- List of National Historic Landmarks in the District of Columbia
- List of octagon houses
- List of octagonal buildings and structures in the United States
- List of the oldest buildings in Washington, D.C.
- Mount Airy, Richmond County, Virginia
- John Tayloe III
- William Thornton
- Architecture of Washington, D.C.
