= Alan T. Nolan =

American military historian and lawyer (1923–2008)

Alan T. Nolan (19 January 1923, in Evansville, Indiana – 27 July 2008, in Indianapolis) was an American military historian, best remembered for his books The Iron Brigade (1961), Lee Considered: General Robert E. Lee and Civil War History (1991), and "Rally, Once Again!": Selected Civil War Writings (2000). A graduate of Indiana University and Harvard Law School, he was a law clerk under Sherman Minton at the United States Court of Appeals for the Seventh Circuit in Chicago. He would later go on to serve as chairman of the disciplinary committee for the Indiana Supreme Court. A board member of the NAACP, and twice named Sagamore of the Wabash, he was awarded an honorary degree in humane letters from Indiana University, and later served as chairman of the Indiana Historical Society.
