= Gary W. Gallagher =

American historian

Gary William Gallagher
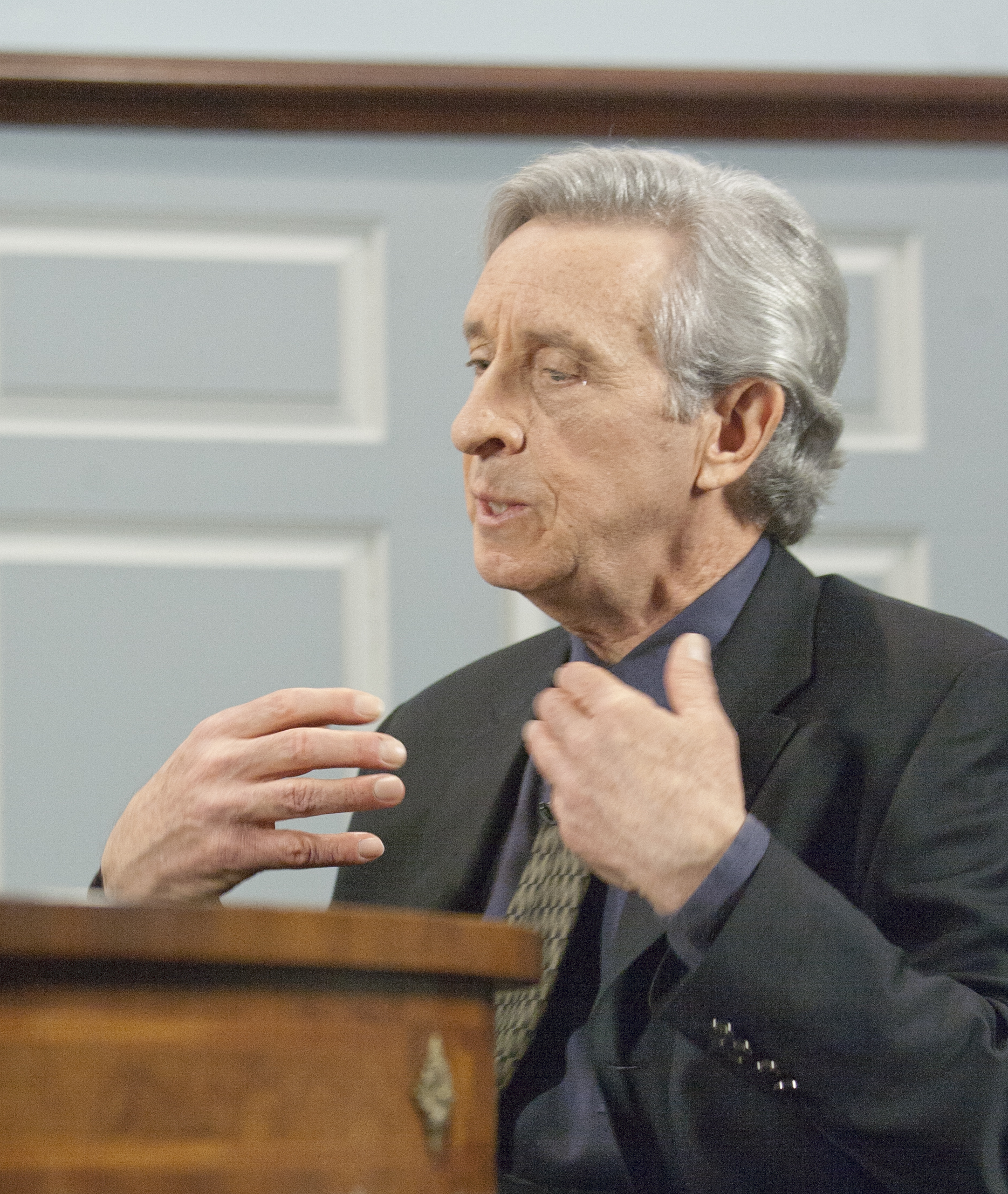
- Born: October 8, 1950 (age 75)
- Education: Adams State College (B.A.); University of Texas at Austin (M.A., Ph.D.)
- Occupation: Historian
- Employer: University of Virginia

Gary William Gallagher (born October 8, 1950) is an American historian specializing in the history of the American Civil War. As of 2024, Gallagher was the John L. Nau III Professor in the History of the American Civil War at the University of Virginia. He produced a lecture series on the American Civil War for The Great Courses lecture series.

== Life and career ==
Gallagher received a Bachelor of Arts in 1972 from Adams State College in Alamosa, Colorado. He then did graduate study in history at the University of Texas at Austin, receiving a Master of Arts in 1977 and a Ph.D. in 1982. He was a professor of history at Pennsylvania State University from 1986 to 1998, when he joined the faculty at the University of Virginia.

Gallagher wrote and presented a lecture series titled "The American Civil War" for The Great Courses available on video and in audio only format on Audible. The series has 48 lectures, 30 minutes each, with 24 hours of lectures in total.

In 2021, Gallagher received The Lincoln Forum's Richard Nelson Current Award of Achievement.

== Works ==
=== Authored Books ===
- The Enduring Civil War: Reflections on the Great American Crisis. LSU Press. 2022. ISBN 978-0807177273
- with Joan Waugh: The American War: A History of the Civil War Era. State College, Pennsylvania: Spielvogel Books, 2015
- Becoming Confederates: Paths to a New National Loyalty. Athens: University of Georgia Press, 2013.
- The Union War. Cambridge, Mass.: Harvard University Press, 2011. (Winner of 2012 Tom Watson Brown Book Prize, 2012 Laney Prize, 2011 Eugene Feit Award in Civil War Studies; The New York Times Book Review Editors’ Choice)
- Causes Won, Lost, and Forgotten: How Hollywood and Popular Art Shape What We Know about the Civil War. Chapel Hill: University of North Carolina Press, 2008.
- Lee and His Army in Confederate History. Chapel Hill: University of North Carolina Press, 2001.
- The American Civil War: The War in the East 1861-May 1863. Oxford: Osprey Publishing, 2000. (History Book Club selection)
- Lee and His Generals in War and Memory. Baton Rouge: Louisiana State University Press, 1998. (Winner of 1998 Fletcher Pratt Award; History Book Club selection)
- The Confederate War. Cambridge, Mass.: Harvard University Press, 1997. (Winner of 1998 Laney Prize and finalist for 1998 Lincoln Prize [shared the prize with three other books]; History Book Club selection)
- Stephen Dodson Ramseur: Lee's Gallant General. Chapel Hill: University of North Carolina Press, 1985. (History Book Club Selection)

=== Edited books ===
- Lee, The Soldier. University of Nebraska Press. 1996. ISBN 978-0803221536
- The Antietam Campaign. University of North Carolina Press. 1999. ISBN 9780807824818.
- Three Days at Gettysburg: Essays on Confederate and Union Leadership. Kent State University Press. 1999. ISBN 9780873386296.
- Fighting for the Confederacy: The Personal Recollections of General Edward Porter Alexander. University of North Carolina Press. 2000. ISBN 9780807882344.
- with Alan T. Nolan: The Myth of the Lost Cause and Civil War History. Indiana University Press. 2000. ISBN 0253338220.
- The Wilderness Campaign. University of North Carolina Press. 2006. ISBN 9780807857854.
- The Shenandoah Valley Campaign of 1864. The University of North Carolina Press. 2009. ISBN 978-0807859568
- Chancellorsville: The Battle and Its Aftermath. University of North Carolina Press. 2012. ISBN 9780807835906.
