= Ogle Hall =

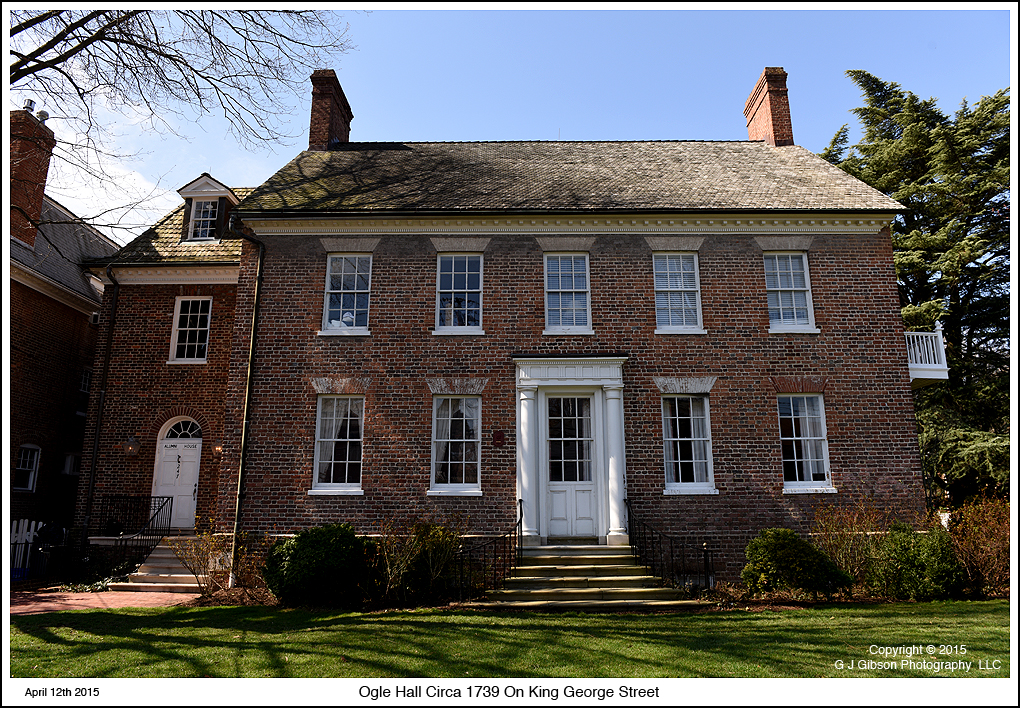
- Ogle Hall

- Location within Maryland Ogle Hall (the United States)

General information
- Architectural style: Georgian
- Location: 247 King George Street, Annapolis, Maryland
- Coordinates: 38°58′53.5″N 76°29′21.6″W
- Completed: 1739

Design and construction
- Architects: William Buckland is attributed to a wing, Unknown

Ogle Hall is a historic building in Annapolis, Maryland, Maryland Inventory of Historic Properties Inventory #AA-530. It is also known as the United States Naval Academy Alumni House.

It is located at 247 King George Street and was built between 1739 and 1742 for Dr. William Stephenson. It changed hands and in 1747, Daniel Cheston leased the property to Provincial Governor of Maryland, Samuel Ogle, giving the building its namesake. Ogle maintained two properties in the Province, the other being the Belair Mansion in nearby Collington, Maryland.

Benjamin Ogle Tayloe was born on May 21, 1796, at Ogle Hall in Annapolis, Maryland, to Anne Ogle Tayloe, daughter of Benjamin Ogle and wife of John Tayloe III of The Octagon House in the Federal CIty of Washington, whose family seat resided on the Northern Neck of Virginia, the colonial estate built by his father-John Tayloe II-Mount Airy, Richmond County, Virginia.

Ogle Hall was sold in 2021 for future use as a boutique hotel.
