= Disciplinary counseling =

A disciplinary counseling session is a meeting between a supervisor and employee. It may focus on a specific work place incident, or may be the result of a performance appraisal. A particular aspect of the employee's performance or conduct may have been identified by the supervisor as requiring attention, or the employee's overall performance or conduct may require adjustment. The counseling process may be initiated and executed by the supervisor and is not considered disciplinary. It is an opportunity for face-to-face communication between the supervisor and the employee, conducted in private, and is intended to have a constructive goal of providing feedback to the employee to correct the problem.

Counseling is an important supervisory skill required as often as any other interaction facing the supervisor. In most cases counseling is a necessary step preceding disciplinary action.

== See also ==
- List of counseling topics
- Sexual harassment
