= Sarah Knowles Bolton =

American writer (1841–1916)

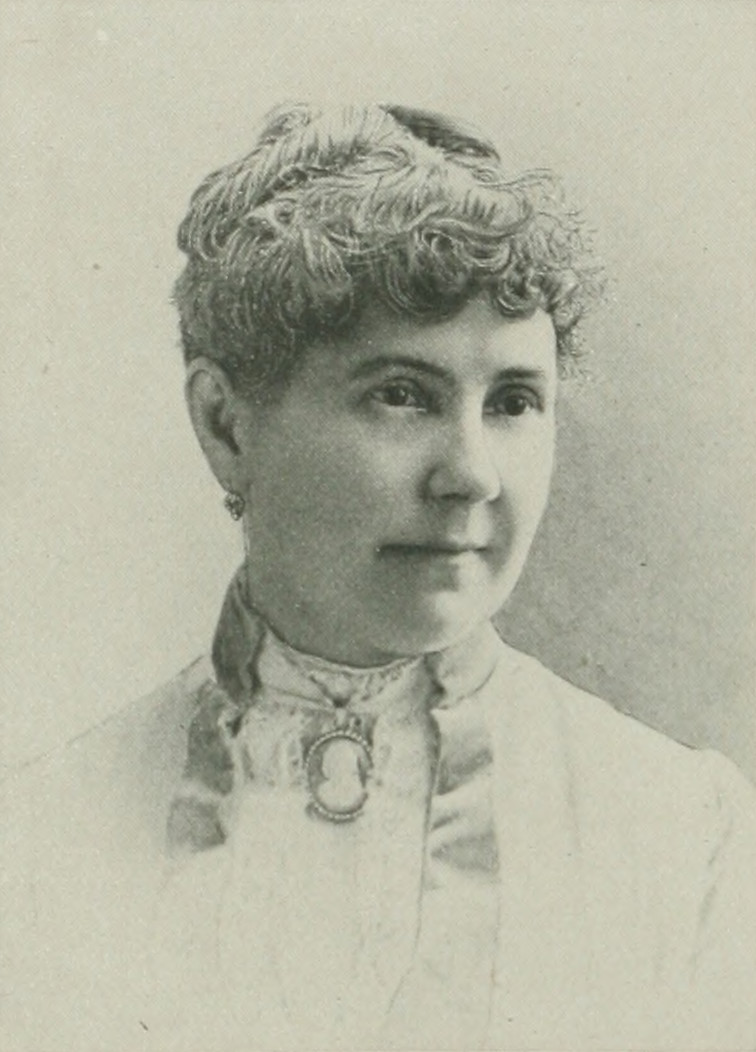
- Portrait from "A Woman of the Century", 1893
- Born: Sarah Elizabeth Mary Knowles Bolton; September 15, 1841 Farmington, Connecticut, U.S.
- Died: February 21, 1916 (aged 74) Cleveland, Ohio, U.S.
- Resting place: Lake View Cemetery
- Occupation: Writer
- Language: English
- Spouse: Charles E. Bolton (m. 1866)

Sarah Elizabeth Mary Knowles Bolton (September 15, 1841 – February 21, 1916) was an American writer. She was born in Farmington, Connecticut. In 1866, she married Charles E. Bolton, a merchant and philanthropist. She wrote extensively for the press, was one of the first corresponding secretaries of the National Woman's Christian Temperance Union (N.W.C.T.U.), and was associate editor of the Boston Congregationalist (1878–81). Bolton traveled for two years in Europe, studying profit-sharing, female higher education, and other social questions. Her writings encouraged readers to improve the world about them through faith and hard work.

== Early years and education ==
Sarah Elizabeth Mary Knowles was born in Farmington, Connecticut, on September 15, 1841, to parents John Segar and Mary Elizabeth Knowles (née Miller). John descended from Henry Knowles, who moved to Portsmouth, Rhode Island, from London, England, in 1665. Her grandmother, Mary Carpenter, was descended from Elizabeth Jenckes, sister of Joseph Jenckes, Governor of Rhode Island. Her mother's ancestry included Nathaniel Stanley, of Hartford, Connecticut, Lieutenant Colonel of First Regiment in 1739; Assistant Treasurer, 1725–49; Treasurer, 1749–55, and from Colonel William Pynchon, one of the 26 incorporators of Massachusetts Bay Colony, and the founder of Springfield, Massachusetts.

At the age of 17, she became a member of the family of her uncle, Colonel H. L. Miller, a lawyer of Hartford, whose extensive library was a delight, and whose house was a center for those who loved scholarship and refinement. The aunt was a person of wide reading, exquisite taste and social prominence. There, the young girl met Harriet Beecher Stowe, Lydia H. Sigourney, and others like them, whose lives to her were a constant inspiration.

Bolton became an excellent scholar and graduated from the seminary founded by Catharine Beecher. Her first published poem appeared in the Waverly Magazine, when she was 15 years old.

== Career ==
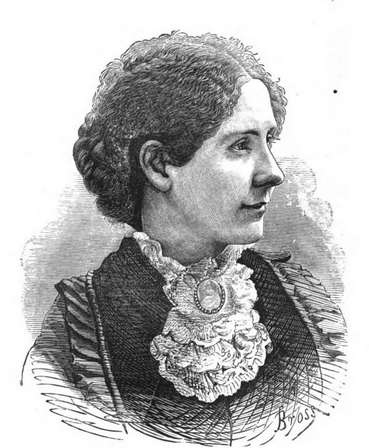
Bolton in 1888

Soon after her graduation she published a small volume, Orlean Lamar and Other Poems (New York City, 1863), and a serial was accepted by a New England paper.

In 1866 she married Charles E. Bolton, a graduate of Amherst College, and they removed to Cleveland, Ohio. The following year, their son, Charles Knowles Bolton was born. He later graduated from Harvard University in 1890, and served as librarian of the Boston Atheneum for thirty five years.

She became the first secretary of the Woman's Christian Association of that city, using much of her time in visiting the poor. When, in 1874, the temperance crusade began in Hillsborough, Ohio, she was one of the first to take up the work and aid it with speeches and writings. She was soon appointed assistant corresponding secretary of the National Woman's Christian Temperance Union, and as such, Frances Willard stated, "She kept articles, paragraphs and enlightening excerpts before the public, which did more toward setting our new methods before the people than any single agency had ever compassed up to that time." At the request of the temperance women of the country. Bolton prepared a history of the crusade for the Centennial temperance volume, and of the Cleveland work for Annie Turner Wittenmyer's History of the Women's Temperance Crusade. At that time, she published her temperance story entitled "The Present Problem" (New York, 1874). Invited to Boston to become one of the editors of the Congregationalist, she proved herself an able journalist.

Bolton passed two years abroad, partly in travel and partly in study, that being her second visit to Europe. She made a special study of woman's higher education in the universities of Cambridge, Oxford, and elsewhere, preparing for magazines several articles on that subject, as well as on woman's philanthropic and intellectual work, and on what was being done for the mental and moral help of laboring people by their employers, reading a paper on that subject at a meeting of the American Social Science Association held in Saratoga Springs in 1883. Bolton's additional published works were, How Success is Won (Boston, 1884); Lives of Poor Bon's who Became Famous (New York, iSSsi; Girls who Became Famous (New York, 1886); Stories from Life (New York, 1886); Social Studies in England (Boston, 18861; From Heart and Nature, Poems (New York. 1887); Famous American Authors (New York, 1887); Famous American Statesmen (New York, 1888); Some Successful Women (Boston, 1888); Famous Men of Science (New York, 1889); Famous European Artists (New York, 18901; English Authors of the Nineteenth Century (New York. 1890); English Statesmen of Queen Victoria's Reign (New York, 1891); Famous Types of Womanhood (New York). Several of these books were reprinted in England.

== Death ==
Bolton died in Cleveland, Ohio, on February 21, 1916. She was buried in Lake View Cemetery.

== Selected works ==
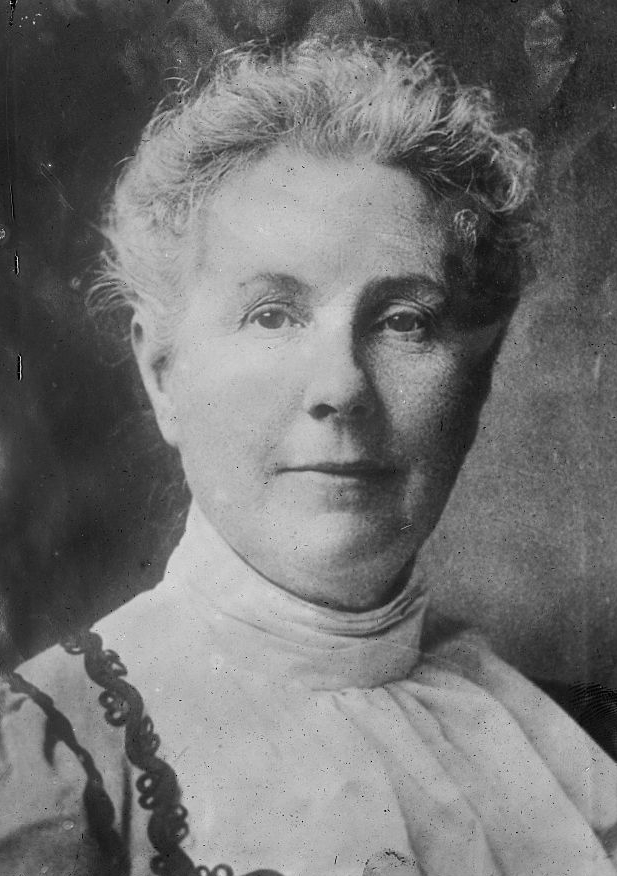
Sarah Knowles Bolton

Between 1863 and 1902, Bolton wrote many poems, children's books and biographical sketches, including:

- "Orlean Lamar, and other poems" (New York, 1863)
- "The Present Problem," a novelette (1874)
- "How Success is Won" (Boston, 1884)
- "Lives of Poor Boys who became Famous" (New York, 1885)
- "Lives of Girls who became Famous" (1886)
- "Social Studies in England" (Boston, 1886)
- "Stories from Life" (New York, 1886)
- "Famous European artists" (New York, 1890)
- "Famous voyagers and explorers" (New York, 1893)
- Famous leaders among men (New York, 1894)
- "The inevitable, and other poems" (New York, 1895)
