= Benjamin Ogle =

American politician (1749-1809)

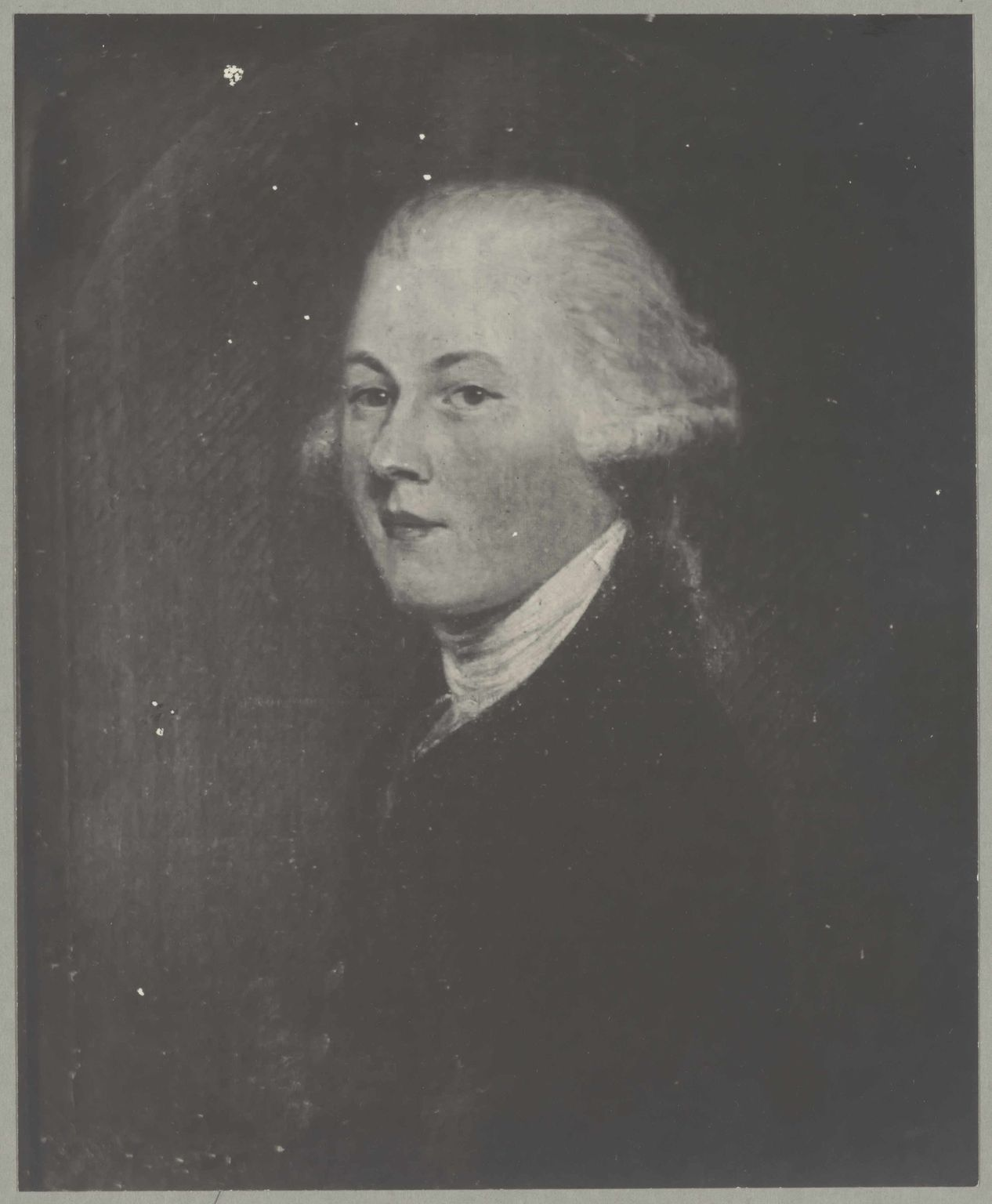

9th Governor of Maryland
- In office November 14, 1798 – November 10, 1801
- Preceded by: John Henry
- Succeeded by: John F. Mercer

Personal details
- Born: January 27, 1749 Annapolis, Province of Maryland, British America
- Died: July 7, 1809 (aged 60) Annapolis, Maryland, U.S.
- Party: Federalist
- Spouse: Henrietta Margaret Hill
- Children: 2

Benjamin Ogle (January 27, 1749 – July 7, 1809) was the ninth governor of Maryland from 1798 to 1801.

== Early life ==
The Ogle family was quite prominent for many centuries in Newcastle-upon-Tyne, Northumberland, England, dating from the medieval period descending from Baron Ogle, the family is allied with the Manners of Rutland, Cavendish family of Newcastle, premier peerage, the Baron de Ros, and the ancient Norman House of Percy. Born in Annapolis, Benjamin Ogle was the son of former Provincial governor, Samuel Ogle and Anne Tasker. Upon his death in 1752, Samuel left his estate to his 3-year-old son Benjamin, but appointed Benjamin Tasker, Sr. as his son's guardian and to manage the estate. Tasker sent young Ogle to England when he was 10 to further his education.

Ogle returned to Maryland in 1770 to find Tasker's daughters (his aunts) were occupying his father's estate, the Belair Mansion, so he resided in his father's city home, Ogle Hall, at 247 King George Street in Annapolis (which is now Alumni House for the United States Naval Academy). Ogle took possession of the Belair Mansion in 1774 after a lawsuit to reclaim his father's home from the Tasker family.

== Career ==
Benjamin Ogle became a member of the Maryland colonial council and would support the American Revolution. Ogle became a friend of George Washington whose presidential records show he dined at Belair on October 1, 1773.

=== Governor of Maryland ===
He was elected Governor of Maryland by the Legislature in 1798, serving until 1801.

Upon George Washington's death in 1799, Ogle issued a proclamation that February 11, 1800 be observed throughout the State as a day of mourning. His precedent started the tradition of observing a holiday on February each year, now known as President's Day.

== Legacy ==
Gov. Benjamin Ogle only had one wife and she was Henrietta Margaret Hill with whom he had a son, Benjamin Ogle II, and two daughters; Ann Ogle married John Tayloe III and Mary Ogle married George Bevans. Gov. Ogle left his estate, Belair, to Benjamin Ogle II upon his death in 1809 in Annapolis. He is buried in Annapolis. Benjamin "Ogle" Tayloe (May 21, 1796 — February 25, 1868) was Benjamin's grandson and an American businessman, bon vivant, diplomat, and influential political activist in Washington, D.C. during the first half of the 19th century. Although he never held elective office, he was a prominent Whig and influential in presidential electoral politics in the 1840s and 1850s. His home, the Tayloe House, became a salon for politically powerful people in the federal government and socially influential individuals in the United States and abroad. Tayloe was also a party in the important 1869 contract law case, Willard v. Tayloe, 75 U.S. 557.

== See also ==
- Ogle family

Political offices
Preceded by John Henry	Governor of Maryland; 1798–1801	Succeeded by John Francis Mercer
