= Association of the Oldest Inhabitants of the District of Columbia =

Civic organization in Washington, D.C.

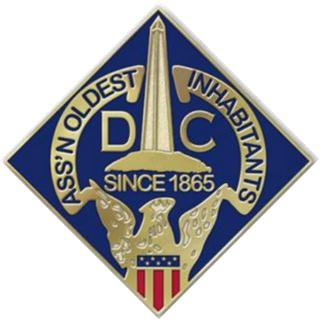
AOI's Membership Lapel Pin created c. 2001 AOI's 2015 Sesquicentennial Challenge Coin Updated for AOI's 160th Anniversary. AOI's 2015 Sesquicentennial Challenge Coin - Reverse depicting L'Enfant's Plan

The Association of the Oldest Inhabitants of the District of Columbia (AOI) is the oldest historic organization in Washington, D.C., representing long-term citizens of the city. The association is dedicated to the District's history and heritage as well as to promoting ideas to improve the future of Washington for its residents.

== Early Organization -- 31 Prominent District Residents ==
It was founded by a number of the District's earliest residents, including Benjamin Ogle Tayloe, Peter Force, and J. Carroll Brent, together with 28 other prominent Washingtonians, on December 7, 1865 — a time of great changes to the city and its population following the American Civil War. The AOI predates the merger of the District of Columbia's separate political entities into a single government (see Washington County, D.C.). Originally, members had to be at least 50 years old and have resided in the District for 40 years. Currently, AOI members must be at least 40 years old and must have lived, worked, or operated a business in the District for at least 20 years or be descended from someone who meets these qualifications. Persons not meeting these qualifications may become Associate Members (all privileges except cannot hold office).

The association became incorporated in 1903. The AOI met in the Old Union Engine House at 19th and H Streets, N.W., from 1911 to 1956, when the House was demolished. Over the years the AOI has supported many important civic initiatives including construction of the District Building, the installation of modern city street lighting, and the adoption of Washington's flag in 1938. The AOI opposed a new flag design in 2002. In support of both the L'Enfant and McMillan Plans, they have campaigned for the reopening of closed streets, including Pennsylvania Avenue in front of the White House, and provide testimony at planning hearings when either of the major plans are threatened. On January 29, 2005, a statue of Alexander Robey Shepherd (territorial governor from 1873 to 1874) was returned to downtown Washington due to the association's efforts. The AOI commissioned a biographical commemorative plaque that was placed at the base of the statue (located on the NE corner of the John A. Wilson (District) Building) in November 2010.

== Why Were There Two AOIs? ==
On July 4, 1920, the AOI invited members of a parallel African American organization, The Association of the Oldest Inhabitants (Colored), Incorporated, to a joint meeting to recognize the District of Columbia's fallen veterans of the Great War (1917-1918). The AOI (Colored), Inc., was incorporated in 1914 and remained an active, vibrant organization well into the 1970s. After a campaign, assisted by the "Washington Post's" John Kelly, 20 years of the AOI Colored's more recent records were serendipitously located by DC author/historian James Goode while conducting research for a book. While interviewing the former owner of a house in the Palisades neighborhood of the District of Columbia he discovered that her grandfather, William D. Nixon, had been the President of the "Oldest Inhabitants, Incorporated" (the organization's preferred name over "The Association of the Oldest Inhabitants (Colored)") from 1942 until 1962. With the assistance of AOI Historian Nelson Rimensnyder and President Bill Brown, William Nixon's descendants worked with archivists at Howard University's Moorland-Spingarn Library where the records were digitized and copies provided back to Mr. Nixon's family members. While the majority of the organization's records (1914 through 1942) are believed lost, the current AOI's efforts to preserve the records of their parallel African-American organization were partially successful.

In October 2022, new AOI member Sherri Sewall shared that she had come into possession of a family artifact of a framed resolution from the AOI (Colored) Incorporated from 1915. The Resolution, honoring AOI Colored’s founder and first President Jerome Johnson was signed by Sherri’s Great-grandfather Dr. George T. Sewall. She shared a photo she had uncovered in her aunt’s collections of an Evening Star article from December 6, 1931, featuring an 1868 photo of the AOI’s leadership, including then President John Bond Blake along with 12 other AOI members. It turns out that John Bond Blake, AOI’s second President, was in fact Sherri Sewall’s Great-great-grandfather! Research revealed that he and Caroline Sewall had nine children. Great-great-granddaughter Sherri Sewall reports that John Bond Blake cared for each of their children even providing for their college educations… And to cement the connection even further, one of John Blake’s daughters, Glovina Sewall was married to Jerome J. Johnson who became the founder of the Association of the Oldest Inhabitants (Colored).

The discovery of these connections helps to explain AOI's on-going question of why the Letters of Incorporation of the AOI of D.C. (Colored) – 1916 – were verbatim the Letters of Incorporation of the original AOI of D.C. – 1903. It appears Sherri Sewall’s Great-grandfather Dr. George T. Sewall – one of those signatories on the 1915 Resolution – was instrumental in establishing the AOI of D.C. (Colored) based upon his father’s position as the President of the original AOI in 1868 and the marriage of his sister Glovina Sewall to Jerome J. Johnson, the First President of the AOI(C).

The AOI for 18 years sought to resolve the connection between these two, parallel historic organizations and are now confident they have uncovered that connection.

At the March 2024 AOI luncheon meeting, Past-President Bill Brown and AOI Director Sherri Sewall jointly presented a program to illustrate and reveal, officially, the most up-to-date finding of the connections between the two organizations. Also, at that luncheon meeting the membership voted upon a Ceremonial Resolution “…to officially welcome and accept descendants of the Association of the Oldest Inhabitants - Colored, Incorporated into the Association of the Oldest Inhabitants of DC.”

Then, at an event sponsored by the AOI of DC and the Heurich House Museum on April 21, 2024, in the Heurich House garden – Collecting DC History – AOI President Dr. Cindy Gueli was approached by Marion Woodfork Simmons who shared that her grandfather Sylvester Roy Woodfork, Sr. served as the President of the Oldest Inhabitants, Incorporated (aka, the descendent organization of the Association of the Oldest Inhabitants (Colored), Incorporated), succeeding William D. Nixon in 1962 and serving until 1966 succeeded by Frank McKinney, 1966-67 Nelson Roots, 1967-69 Paul Brown, and 1970-1977 Arthur Brooks.

There is an unaccounted-for period between 1962 (William Nixon’s end of service) until 1966 when records show that Frank McKinney served as President. And while research into this continues, it is not unreasonable to believe the organization was formally or informally absorbed into the Federation of Civic Associations, today The D.C. Federation of Community Associations, sadly, appears to have folded.

D.C.’s own Arrington Dixon was the first Black member of the AOI of DC and Jan A. K. Evans (brewer Christian Heurich’s granddaughter) was the first female member, both admitted into the organization in the latter 1980’s.

So, after more than 100 years as a segregated organization, the AOI of DC by an overwhelming vote of its membership present March 21, 2024 officially welcomed into its ranks all those persons and their descendants who otherwise were excluded due to their race and gender.

== Initiatives Spanning 3-Centuries ==
Over the years, the various leaders of the AOI supported a number of initiatives such as supporting the George Washington Family Sulgrave-based D.C. Flag design, championing an "official" D.C. song and other softball issues. The organization often butted heads with D.C.'s leadership -- whether under the early Mayoral form of Government, the Territorial Government or the Commissioner-ruled government -- and even "had issues" with the District of Columbia eventually enjoying Home Rule. The organization testified many times before various Congressional committees voting representation in Congress. Until recently when the organization has intentionally remained, for the most part, apolitical earlier leadership of the organization never was in favor of full voting representation or statehood. The debate continues among DC leaders for Statehood, retrocession to Maryland or remaining under the auspices of congress but being treated as a territory (e.g., Puerto Rico) and be exempt from federal taxation.

=== The D.C. (World War I) War Memorial Controversy ===
Since AOI's 2010 Memorial Day event recognizing the 90th anniversary of the District of Columbia's World War I 16th Street Tree Memorial, controversy arose regarding congressional bills calling for re-designating the District's War Memorial (in Ash Grove on Ohio Drive) as a National World War I Memorial. With the encouragement of AOI member Joe Grano, the AOI took a strong stance against this usurpation of our War Memorial and communicated its displeasure to Congresswoman Eleanor Holmes Norton who has, in turn, introduced her own House Resolution telling Sen. Rockefeller (WV) and Cong. Ted Poe (TX) to keep their hands off the D.C. War Memorial.

Since this issue came to light, the AOI strongly encouraged Cong. Norton and District Officials to take a firm stance against these initiatives and we have corresponded with the National Capital Planning Commission, the Commission on Fine Arts and testified before the National Capital Memorial Advisory Commission and the House Committee on Natural Resources. In addition to opposing the re-designation of the DC War Memorial as a National World War I Memorial, the AOI called for recognizing Pershing Park and the American Expeditionary Forces Memorial as a National World War I Memorial.

After 14-years of fund-raising, design and construction The World War Memorial at Pershing Square has finally been dedicated. See the below link to stories covering this long-awaited event.

=== The AOI of D.C. Keeps Alive the Memories of DC's Sons and Daughters Who Perished in the Great War ===
On the 90th Anniversary of the dedication of the District of Columbia 16th Street Tree War Memorial, AOI members and supporters gathered at the northern most point of the 2-mile long "living tree memorial" to celebrate and recognize the (at that time known) 499 District residents who died in service to their country during what was to become known as World War One. At that time, D.C. Council Chairman Phil Mendelson Challenged the AOI and other interested parties to begin planning for the memorial's centennial in 2020. While the Covid-19 pandemic delayed those plans, on Memorial Day 2022 with the support of the District of Columbia Chapter of the D.A.R. and DC Water the AOI unveiled a commemorative, informational wayside at the intersection of 16th Street and Alaska Avenue, N.W.

=== AOI Continues to preserve the District of Columbia's past as its "Living Archive" ===
In a Washington Post article dated August 30, 1993, author Sarah Booth Conroy wrote about the revival of the AOI in the early 1990'sreferring to the organization as "D.C.'s Living Archive." The organization continues to think of it in those terms these days, now in its third century having celebrated its 160th anniversary at its November 20, 2025, luncheon meeting. It has gathered the talks of its more than 160 speakers which have been recorded for posterity since 1999. Thirty-seven of those talks which were captured digitally since 2014 have been uploaded as podcasts to SoundCloud in 2025. Most of AOI's luncheon talks since the emergence from the Covid-19 pandemic have been captured on video and are accessible via AOI's YouTube channel (see link below).

The goal of AOI's current leadership is to digitize not only the 130+ remaining talks (1999-2014) which exist on audio cassette but to also make available through its website a trove of documents and photographs (many oversized) until now only available via its Manuscript Collection, MS422, archived in the Kiplinger Research Library of the DC History Center.
