= Senior peer counseling =

Senior peer counseling, a.k.a. Peer counseling for seniors, provides senior citizens with a trained volunteer counselor to provide assistance with emotional support and encouragement to those who are experiencing life changes that often accompany aging. Seniors typically use counseling to discover ways to deal with grief, loss, physical limitations, financial issues, mild depression, family relationships, loneliness, isolation, housing situations, anxiety, change in cognitive function, and care giving for a spouse.

== Origin ==
The original idea of Senior Peer Counseling was developed in 1977 by Evelyn Freeman, Ph.D. (1917–2013). She first created a program called Senior Health and Peer Counseling of Santa Monica, California. In 1986 in collaboration with others, she produced "Peer Counseling for Seniors: A Trainer's Guide". As a result, various groups utilized her trainer's guide and Senior Peer Counseling programs became available in many California counties as well as in South Carolina, Colorado, Oregon, New Mexico, and Washington. The program is also available in Europe, Canada, and Japan. Sponsorship of the program in those locations comes from county health services, interfaith councils, senior citizen advocacy groups, and non-profit organizations. These Senior Peer Counseling programs vary widely in their methods, and no one program is alike. However, they all operate in the spirit of Evelyn Freeman's vision of Senior Peer Counseling. In addition, even though no two programs are exactly alike, there is an organization called the American Association of Senior Peer Counseling that tries to bring together all of the various Senior Peer Counseling agencies to share opportunities for networking and information.

== Program design characteristics ==
In general, Senior Peer Counseling volunteers are trained to provide one-on-one, (counselor and client) confidential counseling to other persons 50 years of age or older. The counseling sessions are goal-oriented or supportive and are in general one hour per week. The sessions are held in the client's home, a senior citizen center, or another confidential setting and are closely supervised by professionals, i.e., psychologists, marriage and family therapists, or social workers, who intervene, as appropriate, with suggestions about how to handle situations with clients or to provide resources. Confidentiality is only broken in exceptional circumstances, such as when there is suspected child or elder abuse or when the client reports he or she is at risk of suicide, homicide, or grave disability. In these events, counselings have specific reporting instructions to assure the safety of everyone concerned. Referrals to Senior Peer Counseling programs are often made by Adult Protective Services agencies, home health workers, hospitals, social workers, registered nurses, senior housing, or other agencies serving senior citizens. Elders may become aware of the program through postings in senior citizen centers, senior housing, or other agencies serving senior citizens, and may self-refer into the program.

== Effectiveness ==
Seniors counseling may be effective because the counselors often have had life experiences similar to their clients. In contrast, professional counselors may unintentionally create a power imbalance with older clients unfamiliar with formal counseling and many senior clients will not seek formal counseling due to cost or perceived stigma. Senior peer counseling programs, therefore, may provide a more comfortable and supportive environment for the client.

In 2010–2011, Applied Survey Research (ASR) conducted a study of 43 senior peer counseling clients in San Mateo County, California. The study concluded that the clients had discussed personal issues in their lives more often with their senior peer counselors than with anyone else including family, friends, and neighbors. The study also found that 75% of the clients had reported the senior peer counseling had "helped a lot", especially with their concerns about food, health, loneliness, and sadness. Twenty-three percent reported it had "helped a little bit" and 3% reported it "had not helped at all".

== See also ==
- Peer Support
- Peer Mentoring
