= Mental health care navigator =

A mental health care navigator is an individual who assists patients and families to find appropriate mental health caregivers, facilities, and services. Individuals who are care navigators are often trained therapists and doctors.

== Overview ==
The need for mental health care navigators arises from the fragmentation of the mental health industry, which can often leave patients with more questions than answers. Care navigators work closely with patients and families through discussion and collaboration to provide information on the best options and referrals to healthcare professionals, facilities, and organizations specializing in the patients’ needs. The difference between other mental health professionals and a care navigator is that, a care navigator provides information and directs a patient to the best help rather than offering treatment. Still, care navigators may provide diagnosis and treatment planning.

Mental health care navigation is also sometimes provided by self-help books.

== Terminology ==
Many mental health organizations use “navigator” and “navigation” to describe the service of providing guidance through the health care industry. Care navigators are also sometimes referred to as “system navigators.”. One type of care navigator is an "educational consultant."

== Models ==
Models for mental health care navigation can involve many scenarios from a brief consultation to an extended process with follow-up. They offer referrals, assistance with insurance and other financial matters, and general support. A highly detailed method of care navigation with long-term follow-up was developed in 2011 by San Francisco-based psychiatrist and mental health expert Eli Merritt, M.D. His model involves what he calls the “3 R’s” of mental health care: “Research, Resources, and Referrals.” It involves four steps:

- Assessment & Needs Identification. In this preliminary, exploratory phase, care navigators meet with the individual or family seeking help. Patient history and needs are identified. Both the patient and the care navigator think through short- and long-term goals and levels of treatment sought.
- Dialogue & Plan Formation. Through discussion and collaboration, both the patient and care navigator brainstorm next steps, establishing a plan that is specific to the patient's needs.
- Care Coordination. After information gathering and brainstorming, doctors, therapists, and other mental health options are provided to the patient. Questions of affordability arise, and patients are advised toward the best solutions for their conditions and circumstances.
- Continuity. After guiding patients to healthcare providers, care navigators maintain communication and continuity with patients, offering assistance with any future obstacles that might arise.

== See also ==
- Global mental health
- Psychiatry
- Psychiatric rehabilitation
