= Lyman James Briggs =

American physicist and engineer (1874–1963)

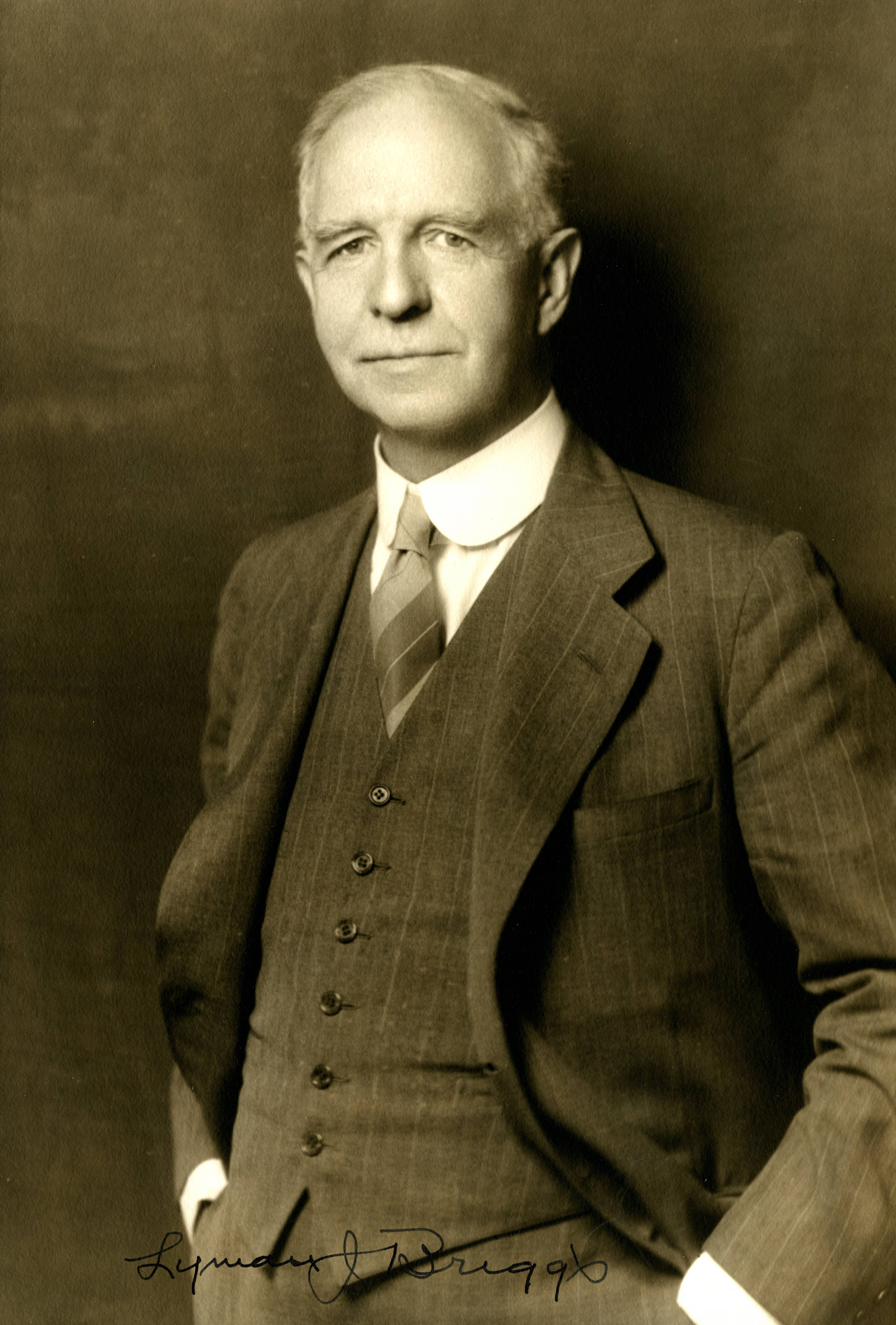

3rd Director of the National Bureau of Standards
- In office June 13, 1933 – November 5, 1945
- President: Franklin D. Roosevelt; Harry S. Truman
- Preceded by: George K. Burgess
- Succeeded by: Edward U. Condon

Personal details
- Born: May 7, 1874 Assyria, Michigan, U.S.
- Died: March 25, 1963 (aged 88) Washington, D.C., U.S.
- Spouse: Katharine Cook
- Children: 2, including Isabel
- Education: Michigan Agricultural College; University of Michigan; Johns Hopkins University
- Occupation: Engineer, physicist, administrator
- Scientific career
- Fields: Applied physics
- Workplaces: US Department of Agriculture; National Bureau of Standards
- Thesis: On the absorption of water vapor and of certain salts in aqueous solution by quartz (1901)
- Doctoral advisor: Henry Augustus Rowland

Lyman James Briggs (May 7, 1874 – March 25, 1963) was an American engineer, physicist and administrator. He was the third director of the National Bureau of Standards (NBS) during the Great Depression and chairman of the Uranium Committee before America entered the Second World War. The Lyman Briggs College at Michigan State University is named in his honor.

== Life and work ==
Briggs was born on a farm in Assyria, Michigan, near Battle Creek, Michigan. He was the eldest of two brothers in a family that descended from Clement Briggs, who arrived in America in 1621 on the Fortune, the first ship to follow the Mayflower. He grew up in an outdoor life with duties to attend such as would be found on an active farm in the late 19th century. He went to the Briggs School built by his grandfather and later was a teacher there.

Briggs entered Michigan Agricultural College (now Michigan State University) in East Lansing, Michigan, entering by examination at age 15. Michigan State was a Land Grant college, so courses were taught in agriculture and mechanical arts. He majored in agriculture, but by graduation time in 1893 his interests had moved on to mechanical engineering and physics. He next entered the University of Michigan in Ann Arbor, Michigan, completing a master's degree in physics in 1895. From there he entered Johns Hopkins University in Baltimore, Maryland, and began work on his PhD.

In 1896 Briggs married Katharine Cook whom he met as an undergraduate at Michigan Agricultural College. Lyman and Katharine Cook Briggs had two children, a boy, Albert (known as "Bertie") and a girl, Isabel. Albert died in infancy, and Isabel would eventually marry Clarence Myers and go on to generate the Myers–Briggs Type Indicator with her mother.

In 1896 he also joined the US Department of Agriculture in Washington, D.C. While in Washington, he continued his research at Johns Hopkins under Henry Augustus Rowland. Although he spent time working with the newly discovered Roentgen Rays, he ultimately graduated in 1903 with a Ph.D. in physics with a dissertation On the absorption of water vapor and of certain salts in aqueous solution by quartz. He was also elected to the Cosmos Club the same year.

=== US Department of Agriculture ===
In Briggs' first professional position he was put in charge of the Physics Laboratory (later the Bureau of Soils) of the US Department of Agriculture. He was one of a new breed of multi-disciplinary scientists studying the biology and ecology of plant life. His research work was concentrated on water retention of soils and he was a founder of the science of soil physics. In 1906 he devised a soil classification technique called the moisture equivalent based on centrifuging, which is considered the first Pedotransfer function. In the same year he also organized a biophysical laboratory that later became the Bureau of Plant Industry. Briggs worked with Homer Leroy Shantz on the effect of environment on the water uptake by plants, and was an early contributor to ecology.

=== World War I ===
Briggs was detailed by an Executive Order to the Department of Commerce's Bureau of Standards in 1917 due to mobilization pressures of World War I. There he developed an artificial horizon device for naval vessels with John Hayford which established a stable zenith independent of the roll of the vessel for the aiming of naval guns. This allowed for the roll of the ship to be observed, so that the firing of the guns could be timed with the roll of the ship. The device was so successful it found its way into the control rooms of most naval vessels. A confidential report called the Hayford–Briggs report was given to the Navy, but never published.

=== National Bureau of Standards (1917–1945) ===
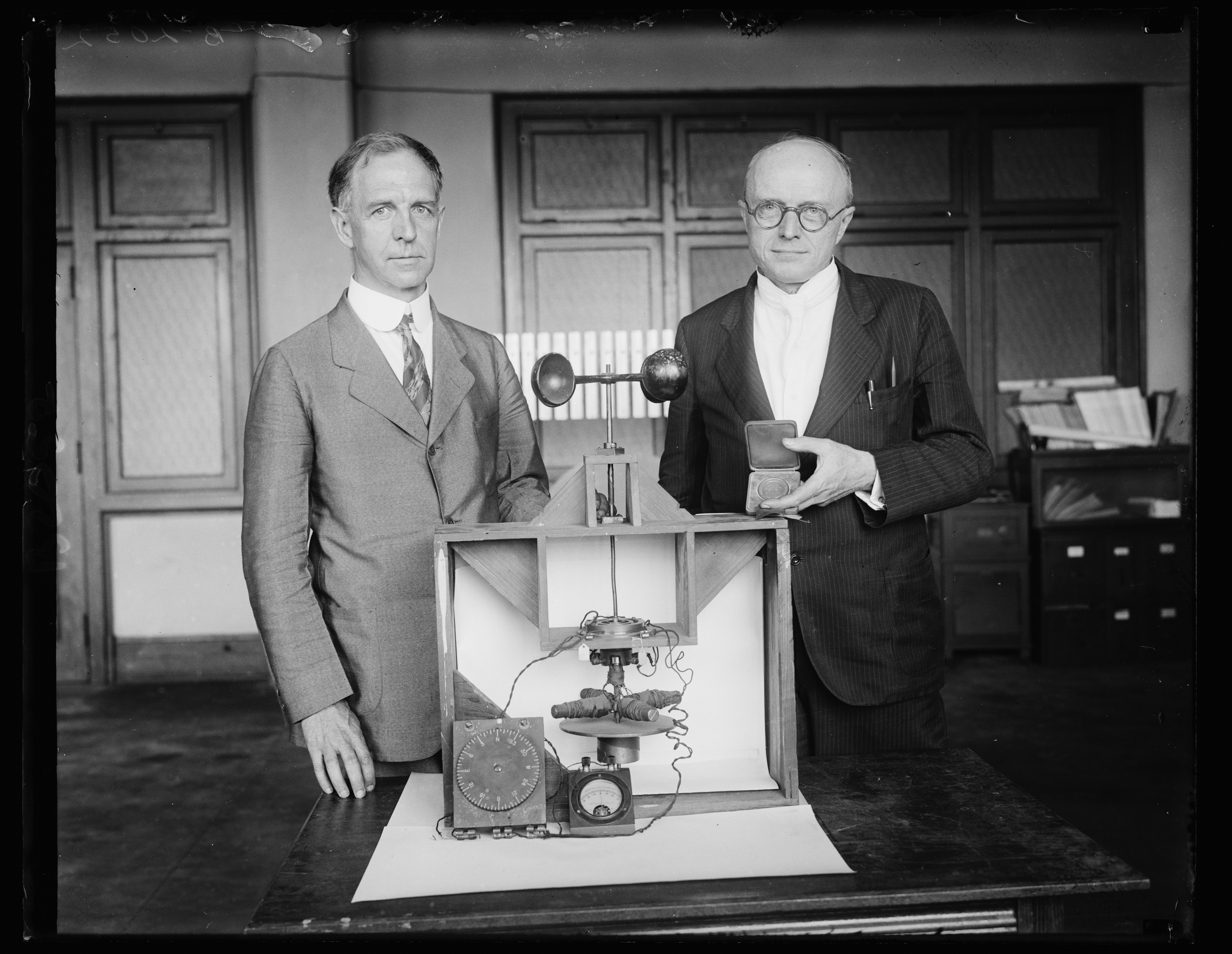
Briggs (left) received the Magellanic Premium together with Paul R. Heyl in 1922

In 1920 Briggs officially left the Department of Agriculture and joined the National Bureau of Standards, where he was chief of the Engineering Physics Division (later the Mechanics and Sound Division). He appointed Hugh L. Dryden to head the Aerodynamics Physics Section, and together they pioneered research in the aerodynamics of airfoils moving near the speed of sound in an airstream. This work had significant application in developing blade forms for aircraft propellers.

He also retained an interest in navigational devices, and with Paul R. Heyl invented the Heyl–Briggs earth inductor compass. The compass used a spinning electric coil subjected to the magnetic field of the Earth to determine the bearing of an airplane in relation to the Earth's magnetic field. For this invention, they received the Magellan Medal of the American Philosophical Society in 1922. This type of compass was used by Admiral Byrd in his flight to the North Pole and by Charles Lindbergh on his 1927 trans-Atlantic flight.

In 1926 Briggs was appointed assistant director for research and testing by National Bureau of Standards Director George Kimball Burgess. On Burgess's death in 1932, Briggs was nominated by US President Herbert C. Hoover to Burgess as director of the National Bureau of Standards. However, none of Hoover's nominations were acted on by the US Congress before he left office. After Franklin D. Roosevelt took office as president in 1933 he was pressed to name "a good Democrat" as director of the National Bureau of Standards. Roosevelt, not wishing to make a patronage appointment, replied, "I haven't the slightest idea whether Briggs is a Republican or a Democrat; all I know is that he is the best qualified man for the job."

Briggs took over the Bureau during difficult times. It was the height of the depression and his first task was to reduce costs 50%. He managed to save the jobs of about 2/3 of the career employees by putting many on part-time employment and transferring others to the American Standards Association while they continued their work at the bureau. He emphasized doing work with direct economic impact and got money from the Works Progress Administration to hire unemployed mathematicians to develop math tables. Due to Briggs outstanding persuasive powers, he managed to get Congress to increase its appropriation for the Bureau in 1935, and many of the employees that were let go were re-hired.

=== Uranium Committee (1939–1941) ===
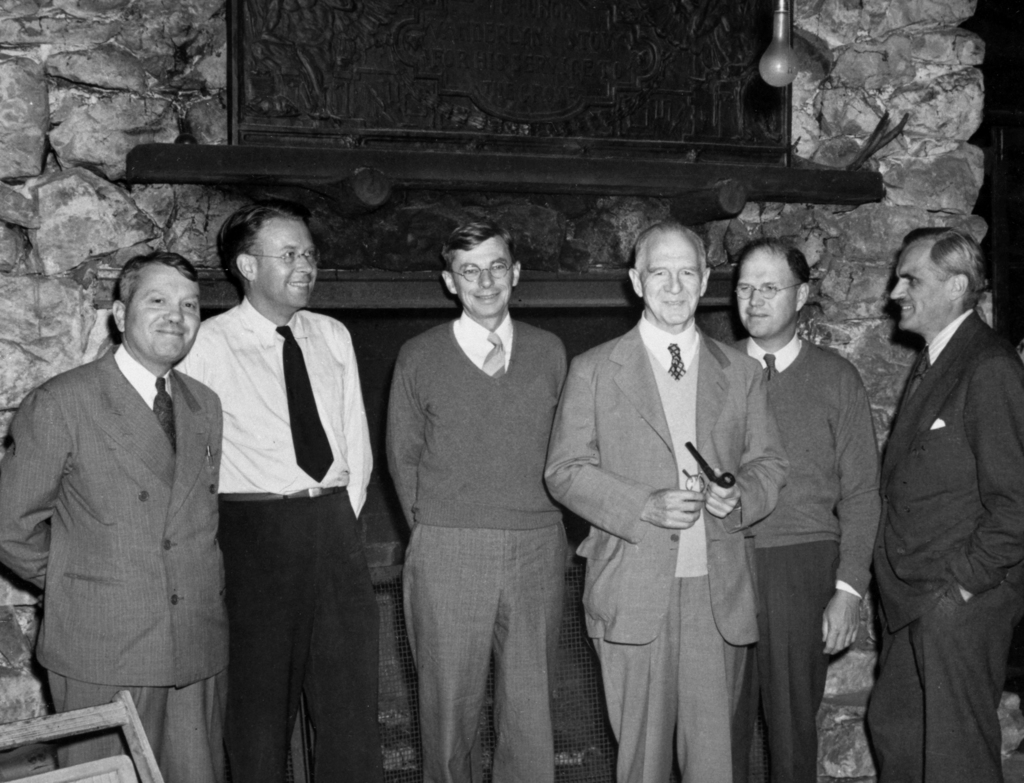
S-1 Executive Committee at the Bohemian Grove, September 13, 1942. From left to right are Harold C. Urey, Ernest O. Lawrence, James B. Conant, Lyman J. Briggs, E. V. Murphree and Arthur Compton

In 1939, President Franklin Roosevelt called on Briggs, by then aged 65, to head the Advisory Committee on Uranium to investigate the fission of uranium, as a result of the Einstein–Szilárd letter. Even though Roosevelt had sanctioned a project, progress was slow and was not directed exclusively towards military applications. Eugene Wigner said that "We often felt as though we were swimming in syrup". Boris Pregel said "It is wonder that after so many blunders and mistakes anything was accomplished at all". Leó Szilárd believed that the project was delayed for a least a year by the short-sightedness and sluggishness of the authorities. At the time Briggs was not well and was due to undergo a serious operation. He was unable to take the energetic action that was often needed.

Meanwhile, in the United Kingdom German refugees Otto Frisch and Rudolf Peierls under professor Marcus Oliphant made a breakthrough, indicating that it would be possible to make an atomic bomb from a relatively small mass of concentrated U-235. From June 1940, copies of British progress reports were sent to Briggs via a British contact in Washington, Ralph H. Fowler. In March 1941 a British committee of Nobel Prize–winning scientists, called the MAUD Committee, concluded that an atomic bomb was "not only feasible, it was inevitable". They also pointed out that a large part of a laboratory in Berlin had been devoted to nuclear research. A copy of the MAUD Committee's interim report was sent to Briggs in the USA because Britain lacked the resources to undertake such a large and urgent program on its own. Britain also wished to move its key research facilities to safety across the Atlantic. The MAUD Committee issued another report giving technical details on the design and costs on 15 July 1941.

Britain was at war and felt an atomic bomb should have the highest priority, especially because the Germans might soon have one; but the US was not at war at that time and many Americans did not want to get involved. One of the members of the MAUD Committee, Marcus Oliphant flew to the United States in late August 1941 in an unheated bomber to find out why the United States was ignoring the MAUD Committee's findings. Oliphant said: "The minutes and reports had been sent to Lyman Briggs, who was the Director of the Uranium Committee, and we were puzzled to receive virtually no comment. I called on Briggs in Washington, only to find out that this inarticulate and unimpressive man had put the reports in his safe and had not shown them to members of his committee. I was amazed and distressed."

Oliphant then met the whole Uranium Committee. Samuel K. Allison was a new committee member, a talented experimentalist and a protégé of Arthur Compton at the University of Chicago. "Oliphant came to a meeting", Allison recalls, "and said 'bomb' in no uncertain terms. He told us we must concentrate every effort on the bomb and said we had no right to work on power plants or anything but the bomb. The bomb would cost 25 million dollars, he said, and Britain did not have the money or the manpower, so it was up to us." Allison was surprised that Briggs had kept the committee in the dark.

Oliphant visited other physicists to galvanise the USA into action. As a result, in December 1941 Vannevar Bush, director of the powerful Office of Scientific Research and Development, undertook to launch a full-scale effort to develop atomic bombs. As the scale of the project became clearer, it came under direct military control as the Manhattan Project.

=== World War II ===
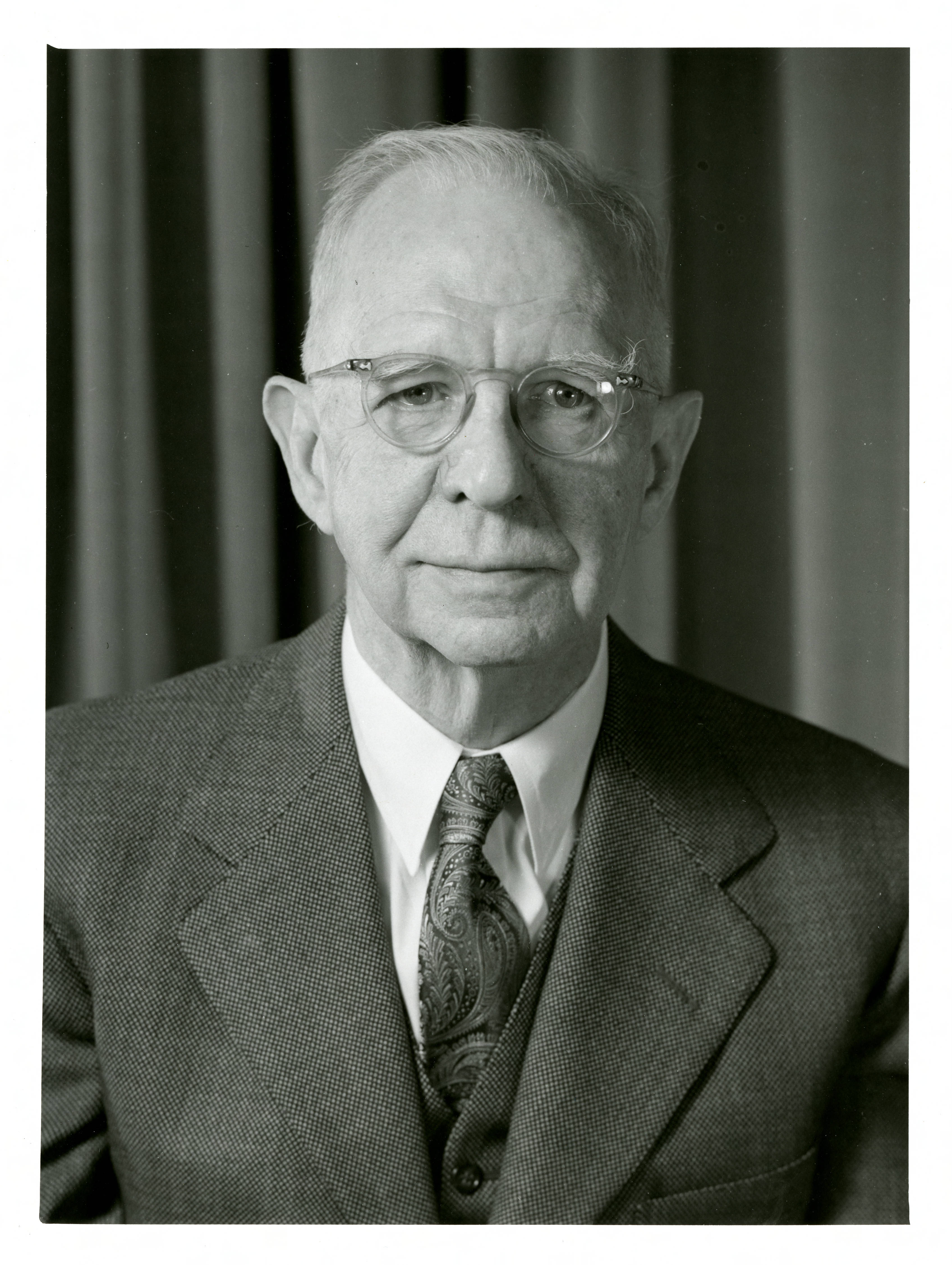
Briggs in 1954

Briggs sought new business for the Bureau. In 1939 he sent Secretary of Commerce Daniel C. Roper a list of services the Bureau could provide in the event of armed conflict in Europe. By 1942 90% of the Bureau's activities were classified work for the war effort. Some of the Bureau's activities were the non-rotating proximity fuze, guided missile developments, establishment of a Radio Propagation Laboratory, critical materials research on optical glass which Germany had previously supplied, on quartz and synthetic rubber and measurement and calibration services. Briggs changed the Bureau's culture from one of open access to one of secrecy.

Briggs retired from the Bureau in 1945, at the age of 72. He was appointed director emeritus of NBS after working for 49 years in federal government. Bureau employees erected a bronze sundial in his honor through their Employees Welfare Association. At his request the names of the first three directors of Bureau are cast onto the rim of the instrument: Samuel Wesley Stratton, George Kimball Burgess, and Lyman James Briggs.

In 1948 Briggs received the Medal of Merit from US President Harry Truman for his distinguished work in connection with World War II.

At the request of Secretary of Commerce Henry A. Wallace, he wrote a 180-page account on NBS war research that was published in 1949.

=== Later life ===
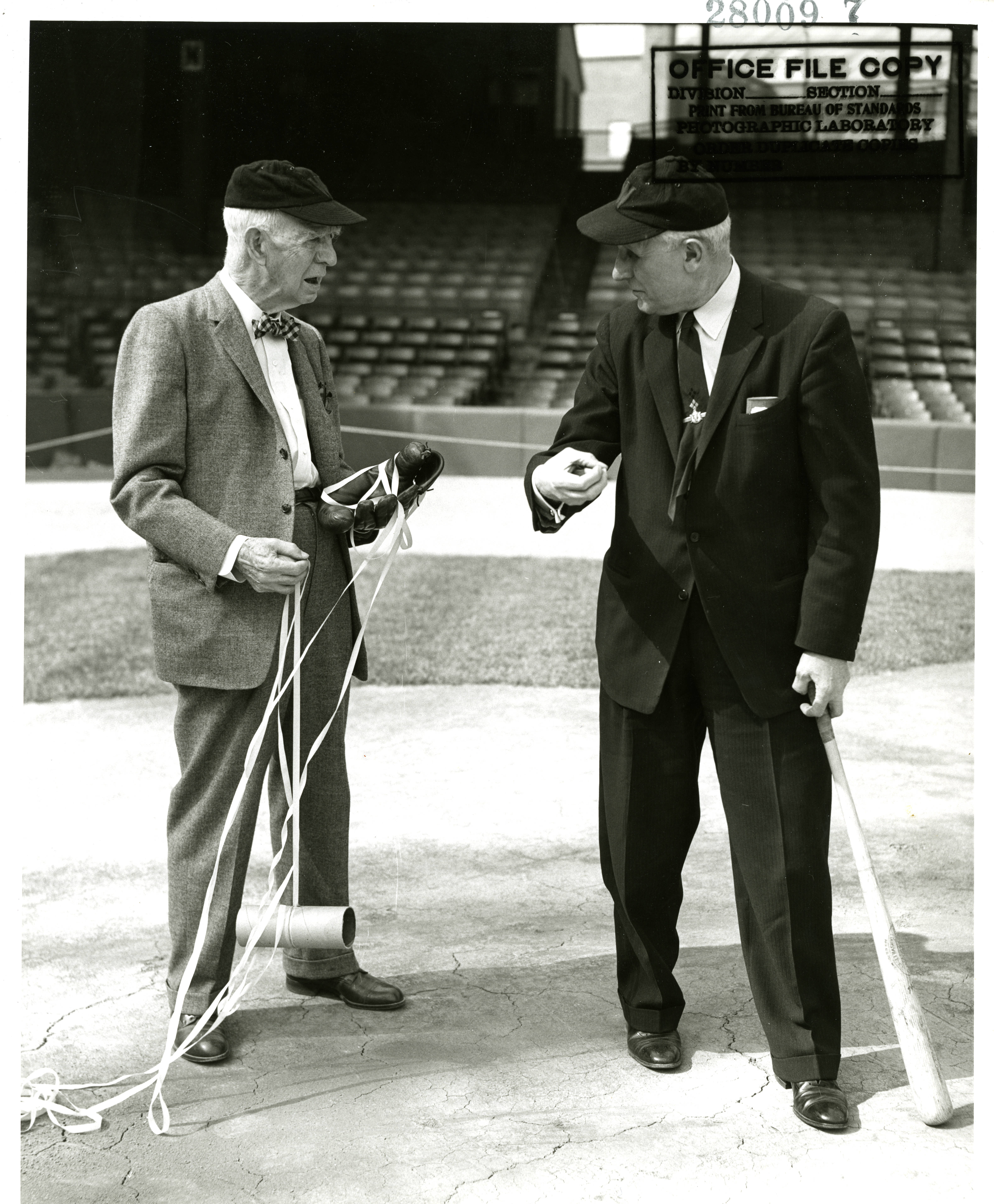
Briggs and Ossie Bluege, Comptroller of the Washington Baseball Club and formerly third baseman and manager, at Griffith Stadium measuring the spin of a perfectly pitched ball with the aid of a flat measuring tape fastened to the ball

In his retirement, Briggs returned to research, establishing a laboratory for studying fluids under negative pressure at the National Bureau of Standards. This topic was directly related to his earlier research on the water uptake of plants. In one famous experiment, he measured the negative pressure (or tension) that would break a column of water held in a capillary tube by capillary action. At room temperature, the maximum attainable tension in water was 250 bar, and in mercury, nearly 500 bar. This finding was published in several papers between (1950–1953), and the 1950 paper remains a classic and is still regularly cited in the literature on metastable water.

Briggs' love for baseball triggered another piece of research. During World War II, the government mandated that the rubber in baseballs be replaced by cork. Complaints about the new balls led Briggs to test them, and in 1945, he demonstrated that the new baseballs were inferior. This was done by addressing the issue of whether or not a pitched baseball could curve out of the plane of the pitch. With the help of two pitchers from the Washington Senators baseball club and his 1917 wind tunnel, he studied the effect of spin and speed on the trajectory and established the relationship between the amount of spin and the curvature of the ball (see curveball). To measure the spin, he attached a lightweight tape to the ball and counted the twists in the tape. This popular newspaper topic is probably the most widely known of his research results.

Another of Briggs' many interests was the National Geographic Society, and in 1934, he chaired the Society's Committee on Research and Exploration. During this time, he instrumented two stratospheric balloon flights, the second of which broke the existing record for altitude in 1936. During retirement, he became more active in the Society and led an expedition to study the solar eclipse in Brazil in 1947. Briggs often wrote articles for the National Geographic Magazine.

Briggs died on March 25, 1963, aged 88, after a diverse life of scientific exploration and service. He is remembered for his range of interests. Briggs was almost universally liked and had a reputation for levelheadedness and serenity. Edward U. Condon, Briggs' successor at the Bureau, said: "Briggs should always be remembered as one of the great figures in Washington during the first half of the century, when the Federal Government was slowly and stumblingly groping towards a realization of the important role science must play in the full future development of human society."

In 2007, Michigan State University honored the Lyman Briggs school, named for Briggs, by allowing it to become the Lyman Briggs College.

== Awards, honors and distinctions ==
Positions:

- Philosophical Society of Washington, President, 1916
- Washington Academy of Sciences, President, 1917
- Federal Specifications Board, Chairman, 1932
- Federal Fire Council, Chairman, 1933–1939
- National Bureau of Standards, Director, 1933–1945
- National Geographic Society, Life Trustee, 1933–1964
- Special Advisory Committee for Stratospheric Balloon Flights, Chairman, 1935–1936
- National Conference on Weights and Measures, Chairman, 1935
- American Physical Society, President, 1938
- Uranium Committee S-1 of the National Defense Research Committee, Chairman, 1939
- Research Committee of the National Geographic Society, Chairman, 1937
- National Advisory Committee for Aeronautics, Vice-chairman, 1942
- National Bureau of Standards, Director Emeritus, 1945–1963

Honorary doctorates by the following institutions:

- Michigan State College in Science (1932)
- South Dakota School of Mines, Engineering (1935)
- University of Michigan, Law (1936)
- George Washington University, Science (1937)
- Georgetown University, Science (1939)
- Columbia University, Science (1939)

Briggs received the following honors:

- American Philosophical Society, Magellanic Premium (1922)
- American Philosophical Society, Elected Member (1935)
- American Academy of Arts and Sciences, Elected Member (1939)
- National Academy of Sciences, Elected Member (1942)
- Medal of Merit by President Harry S. Truman (1948)
- Franklin R. Burr Award, National Geographic Society (1954, 1962)

Served as president of:

- American Physical Society
- Washington Academy of Sciences
- Philosophical Society of Washington
- Cosmos Club, Washington, D.C.
- Federal Club, Washington, D.C.

== Publications ==
- Lyman J. Briggs with:

- J. W. McLane, The moisture equivalents of soils USDA Bur. Soils Bull. 45. (1907)
- J. W. McLane, Moisture equivalent determinations and their application, Proc. Am. Soc. Agron. 2:138–47. (1910)
- H. L. Shantz, A wax seal method for determining the lower limit of available soil moisture, Bot. Gaz. 51:210–19. (1911)
- H. L. Shantz, The wilting coefficient for different plants and its indirect determination, Bot. Gaz. 53:20–37 (1912)
- P. R. Heyl. The earth inductor compass. Proc. Am. Philos. Soc. 61:15–32. (1922)
- G. F. Hull and H. L. Dryden. Aerodynamics of airfoils at high speeds. Natl. Adv. Comm. Aeron. Rep. 207. (1925)

- Lyman J. Briggs:

- Summary of the results of the stratosphere flight of the Explorer II. Natl. Geogr. Soc. Technol. Pap. Stratosphere Series. 2:5–12. (1936)
- NBS War Research: The National Bureau of Standards in World War II. NIST archives (1949)
- Methods for measuring the coefficient of restitution and the spin of a ball. J. Res. Natl. Bur. Stand. 34:1–23. (1945)
- Lyman J. Briggs, Effect of spin and speed on the lateral deflection (curve) of a baseball and the Magnus effect for smooth spheres. Am. J. Phys. 27:589–96. (1959)
- Lyman J. Briggs, Limiting negative pressure of water, J. Appl. Phys. 21:721–22. (1950)
- The limiting negative pressure of mercury in Pyrex glass. J. Appl. Phys. 24:488–90. (1953)

== See also ==
- ASM-N-2 Bat

Government offices
Preceded by George K. Burgess	3rd Director of the National Bureau of Standards; 1933 – 1945	Succeeded by Edward Condon
