= George K. Burgess =

American physicist

George Kimball Burgess
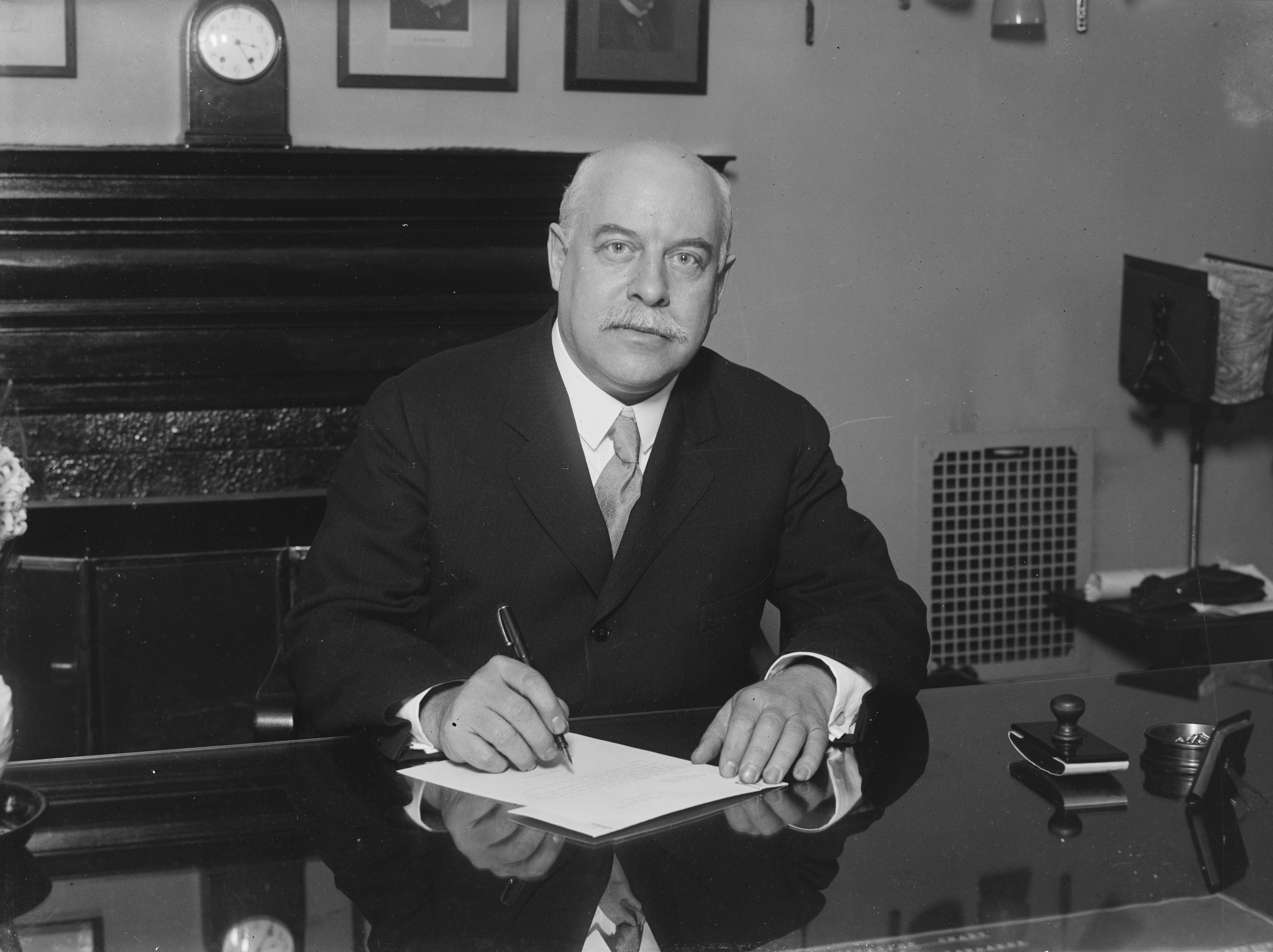
- Burgess in 1924

2nd Director of the National Bureau of Standards
- In office April 21, 1923 – July 2, 1932
- President: Warren G. Harding; Calvin Coolidge; Herbert Hoover
- Preceded by: Samuel Wesley Stratton
- Succeeded by: Lyman James Briggs

Personal details
- Born: January 4, 1874 Newton, Massachusetts
- Died: July 2, 1932 (aged 58) Washington, D.C.
- Scientific career
- Education: Massachusetts Institute of Technology; University of Paris
- Fields: Physics
- Workplaces: Massachusetts Institute of Technology; University of Michigan; National Bureau of Standards

George Kimball Burgess (January 4, 1874 – July 2, 1932) was an American physicist, considered one of the most notable scientists of his era. He authored and translated numerous studies, was a leading member and president of many scientific societies and, for the last nine years of his life, served as the second director of the National Bureau of Standards.

== Biography ==
He was born on January 4, 1874, in Newton, Massachusetts, to Charles A. Burgess and Addie L. Kimball. He graduated from the Massachusetts Institute of Technology with a B.S. degree in 1896 and, in 1901, received from the University of Paris his Sc.D. with "very honorable mention", the highest commendation accorded to a doctorate. During his time in Paris, he met and married Suzanne Babut and, following his return to the U.S., served as physics instructor at MIT and at the universities of Michigan and California.

In 1903 he became associate physicist in the National Bureau of Standards, paying particular attention to pyrometric researches. Besides translating Henry Louis Le Chatelier's High Temperature Measurements (1901), and Pierre Duhem's Thermodynamics and Chemistry, he published his 1901 French-language dissertation, Recherches sur la constante de gravitation as well as Experimental Physics, Freshman Course (1902), The Measurement of High Temperatures (with Le Chatelier, 1911; third edition, revised, 1912) and A Micropyrometer (1913). He also served, from 1911, as editor of Journal of the Washington Academy of Sciences. He was renowned as a top expert in metallurgy and, during World War I, developed, with other scientists, multiple instruments for military use, including those designed for camouflage, radio communication and aeronautics. In 1918, Burgess served as president of the Philosophical Society of Washington. In 1923, he became second director of the National Bureau of Standards and held the post until his death.

George Burgess, who was a member of the foreign service as well as a number of government consultative bodies, was in the midst of consultations regarding the ongoing financial crisis when he suffered a fatal cerebral hemorrhage in his Washington, D.C., office and died on the way to Emergency Hospital. He was 58 years old, and was survived by his wife, Suzanne.

Government offices
Preceded by Samuel Wesley Stratton	2nd Director of the National Bureau of Standards; 1923 – 1932	Succeeded by Lyman James Briggs
