= Paul R. Heyl =

American physicist and writer

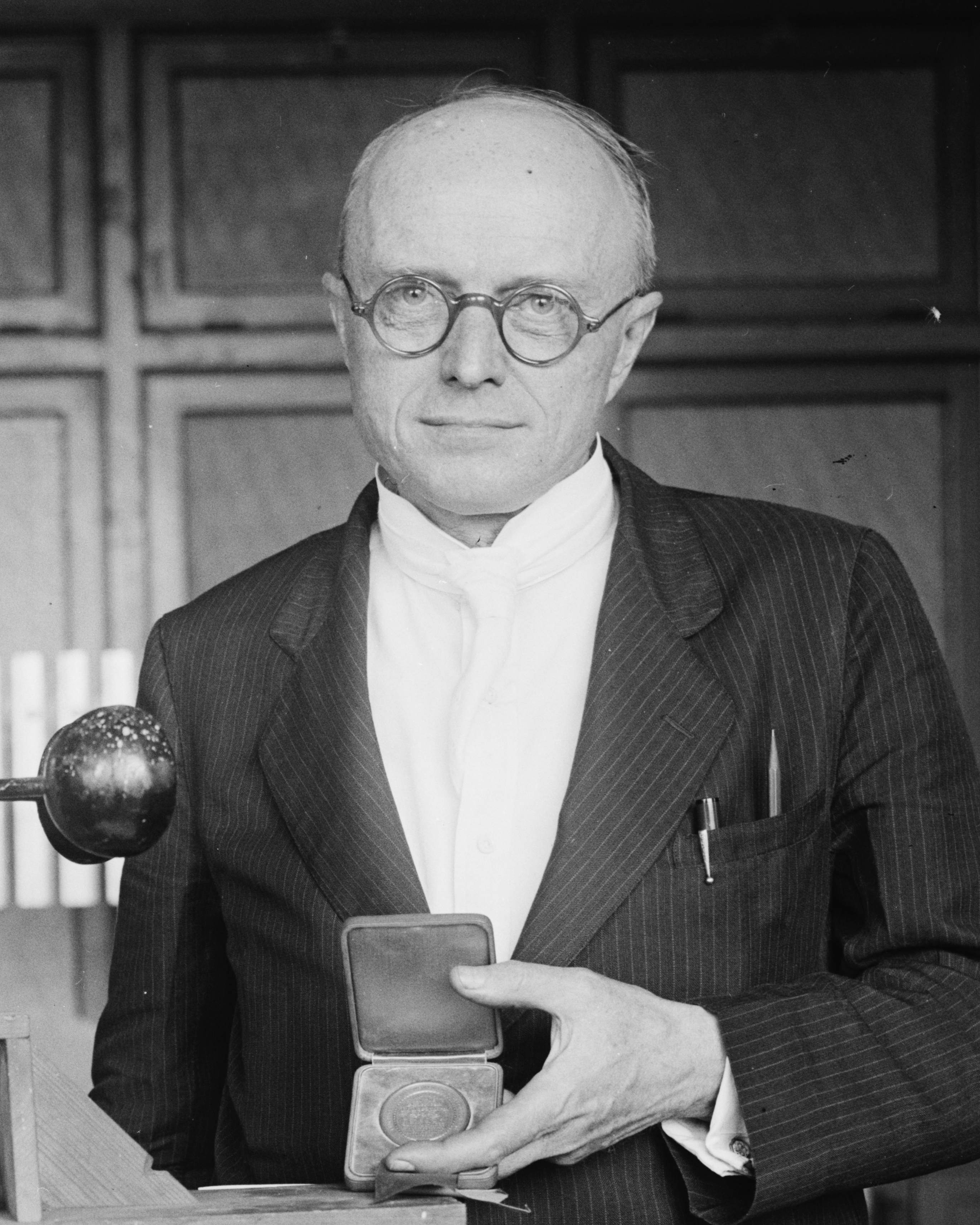
Paul Renno Heyl

Paul Renno Heyl (1872 in Philadelphia – 22 October 1961) was an American inventor, physicist, and author.

== Biography ==
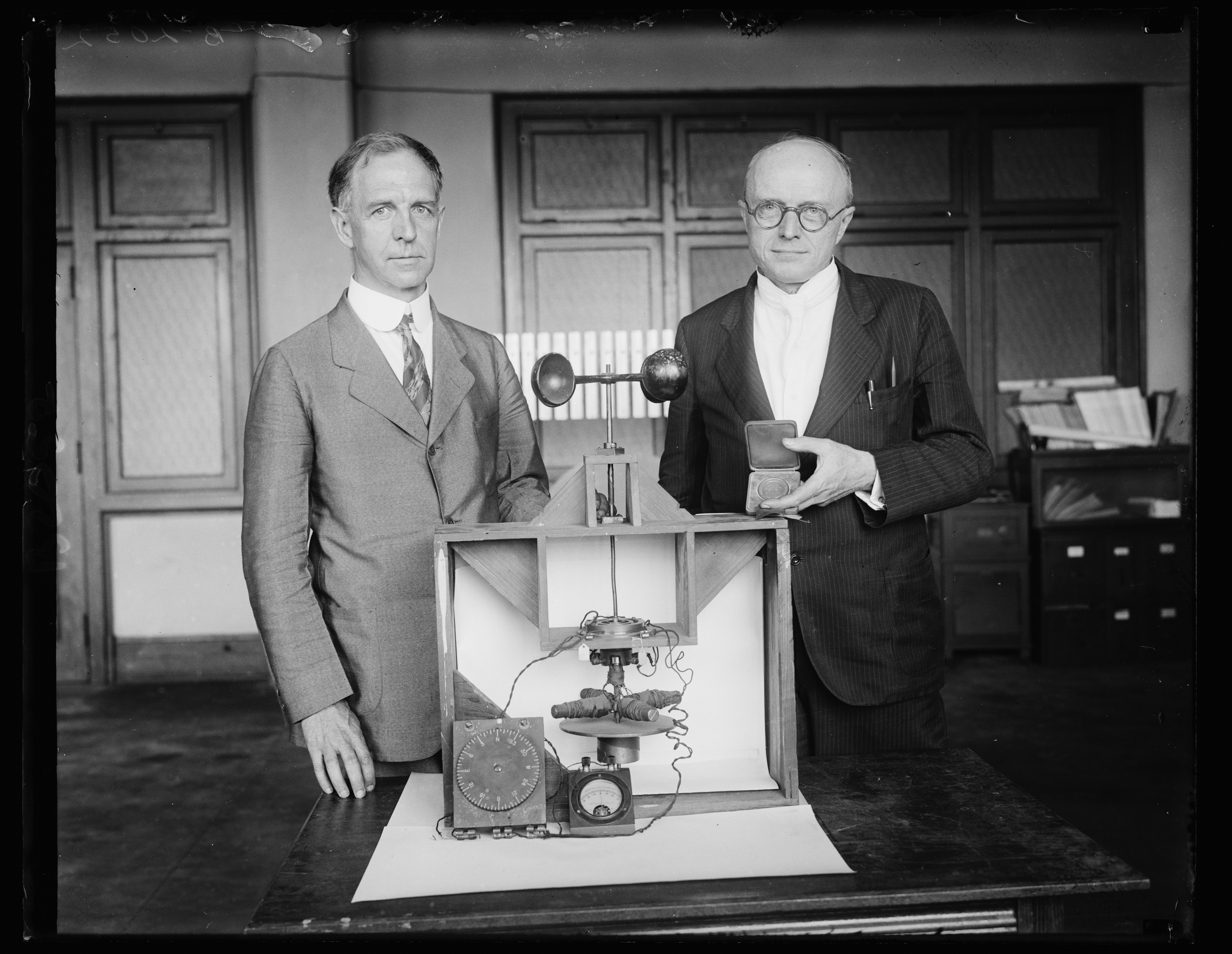
Heyl (right) received the Magellanic Premium together with Lyman James Briggs in 1922

Born in Philadelphia, Heyl earned his PhD in physics in 1899 from the University of Pennsylvania. For several years he taught in high schools in Pennsylvania. In 1907, he won the Franklin Institute's Boyden Premium. In 1910, he joined the physics staff of the Commercial Research Corporation in New York. In 1920, he was employed as a physicist at the National Bureau of Standards in Washington D.C. With Lyman J. Briggs, Heyl invented the Heyl–Briggs earth inductor compass. The compass used a spinning electric coil mounted in an airplane to determine the airplane's bearing in relation to the Earth's magnetic field. This invention won for Heyl and Briggs the 1922 Magellan Medal of the American Philosophical Society. At the NBS, Heyl worked on a redetermination of Newton's constant of gravitation using a torsion balance. In 1928, Heyl served as president of the Philosophical Society of Washington. He retired form the NBS in 1942. He won the Potts medal in 1943.

He married Lucy Knight Daugherty; they had two daughters, one of whom died in infancy.

== Selected publications ==
- The mystery of evil. Chicago: Open Court. 1920.
- The common sense of the theory of relativity. Baltimore: Williams & Wilkins. 1924.
- with V. L. Chrisler: Architectural acoustics. United States. Bureau of Standards. Circular of the Bureau of Standards.C418. Washington, D.C.: U. S. Government Printing Office. 1926; several reprints
- The fundamental concepts of physics in the light of modern discovery (three lectures at Carnegie Institute of Technology, Pittsburgh, January, 1925). Baltimore: Williams & Wilkins. 1926.
- The lingering dryad. Washington, D.C.: Smithsonian Institution. 1930.
- "New frontiers of physics". Appleton new world of science series. New York: D. Appleton & Co. 1930.
- The philosophy of a scientific man. New York: Vanguard Press. 1933.
- The value of gravity at Washington, D.C. Washington, D.C.: U. S. Government Printing Office. 1936.
- Electronics, reprints of a series of lectures. Indianapolis: P. R. Mallory & Co. 1943.
