= Clarence Dutton =

American geologist (1841–1912)

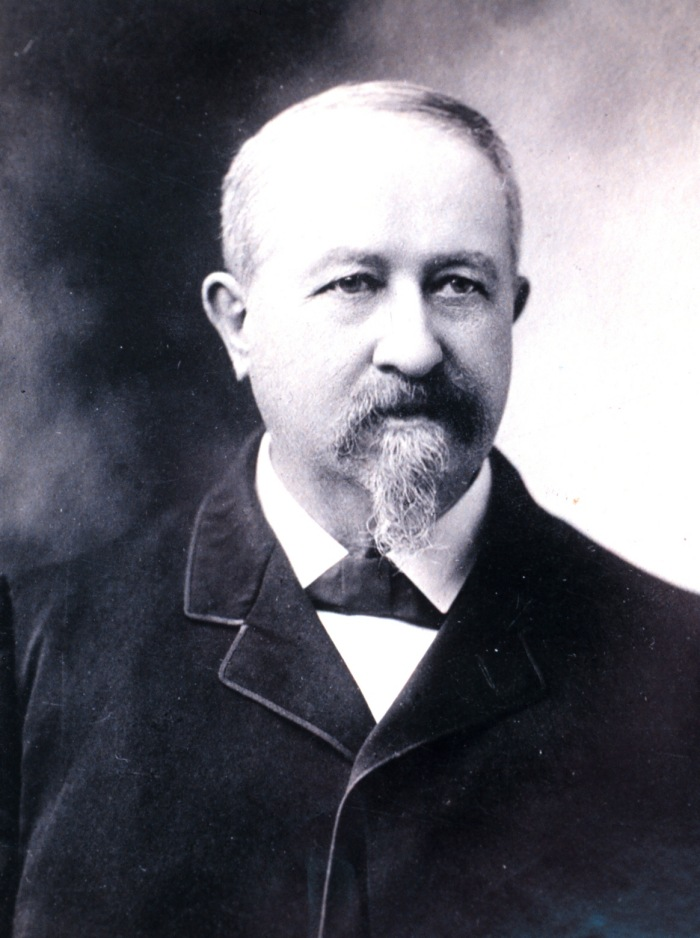
- Clarence Dutton
- Born: May 15, 1841; Wallingford, Connecticut
- Died: January 4, 1912 (aged 70); Englewood, New Jersey
- Education: Yale College
- Known for: Isostasy, Grand Canyon geology
- Scientific career
- Fields: Geology

Clarence Edward Dutton (May 15, 1841 – January 4, 1912) was an American geologist and US Army officer.

== Life and career ==
Dutton was born in Wallingford, Connecticut on May 15, 1841. He graduated from Yale College in 1860 and took postgraduate courses there until 1862, when he enlisted in the 21st Connecticut Volunteer Infantry; he fought at Fredericksburg, Suffolk, Nashville and Petersburg. He was elected as a member to the American Philosophical Society in 1871. In 1875, he began work as a geologist for John Wesley Powell and, after 1879, for the U.S. Geological Survey (USGS). Working chiefly in the Colorado Plateau region, he wrote several classic papers, including geological studies of the high plateaus of Utah (1879–80), the Cenozoic history of the Grand Canyon district (1882), and the Charleston, South Carolina, earthquake of 1886. As head of the division of volcanic geology at the USGS, he studied volcanism in Hawaii, California, and Oregon. He helped coordinate the scientific response to a large earthquake in the Mexican state of Sonora in 1887.

In 1878, he was one of the ten founders of the Cosmos Club. He was elected a member of the National Academy of Sciences in 1884.

In 1886, Dutton led a USGS party to Crater Lake, Oregon. His team carried a half-ton survey boat, the Cleetwood, up the steep mountain slope and lowered it 2,000 feet (610 m) into the lake. From the Cleetwood, Dutton used piano wire with lead weights to measure the depth of the lake at 168 different points. The survey team determined the lake was 1,996 feet (608 m) deep. The currently-accepted maximum depth figure, measured by sonar, is 1,943 feet (592 m).

In a footnote to an 1882 review in the American Journal of Science, Dutton coined the term "isostasy". He later stated: "In an unpublished paper I have used the terms isostatic and isostacy (sic) to express that condition of the terrestrial surface which would follow from the flotation of the crust upon a liquid or highly plastic substratum – different portions of the crust being of unequal density." Thus, he realised that there is a general balance within the Earth's crust, with lighter weight blocks coming to stand higher than adjacent blocks with higher density, an idea first expressed by Pratt and Airy in the 1850s. Dutton elaborated these ideas in his address to the Philosophical Society of Washington in 1889. When this was printed in 1892, the term isostasy was formally proposed, Dutton having, on the advice of Greek scholars, changed the ‘c’ to an ‘s’.

Dutton was a close associate of John Wesley Powell, G.K. Gilbert, and William Henry Holmes at the USGS. He was an energetic and effective field geologist: in 1875–1877 Dutton's field party mapped 12,000 square miles (31,000 km^{2}) of the high plateaus of southern Utah, an area of rugged topography and poor access.

Dutton had a distinctive flair for literary description, and is best remembered today for his colorful (and sometimes flamboyant) descriptions of the geology and scenery of the Grand Canyon region of Arizona. "Dutton first taught the world to look at that country and see it as it was... Dutton is almost as much the genius loci of the Grand Canyon as Muir is of Yosemite" – Wallace Stegner, Beyond the Hundredth Meridian.

In 1891 he retired from the USGS to serve as commander of the arsenal of San Antonio, Texas; then as ordnance officer of the department of Texas. After retiring from the Army in 1901, he returned to the study of geology. Dutton spent his last years at the home of his son in Englewood, New Jersey.

== Notable publications ==
- 1880, Report on the Geology of the High Plateaus of Utah. U.S. Geog. and Geol. Survey of the Rocky Mountain Region, vol. 32, 307 pp. and atlas.
- 1882, Tertiary History of the Grand Canyon District. U.S. Geol. Survey Monograph 2, 264 pp. and atlas.
- 1884, Hawaiian Volcanoes. U. S. Geol. Survey, 4th Ann. Rpt., pp. 75–219.
- 1889, The Charleston Earthquake of August 31, 1886. U.S. Geol. Survey, Ann. Rpt. 9, pp. 203–528.
- 1889, On Some of the Greater Problems of Physical Geology. Bull. Phil. Soc. Wash., 11:51–64. Proposed the new term isostasy.
- 1904, Earthquakes, in the light of the new seismology
