= Mark H. Thiemens =

US scientist and academic

- Born: St Louis, Mo, United States
- Education: B.S. Univ. Miami, M.S. Old Dominion University, PhD. Florida State University Miami
- Known for: Discovery of mass independent isotope chemistry and applications across nature in space and time, origin of life, climate change and physical chemistry of isotope effects
- Spouse: Nasrin Marzban
- Children: Maxwell Marzban Thiemens, Lillian Marzban Thiemens
- Awards: Royal Society Foreign Member Goldschmidt Medal; E.O. Lawrence Medal; Leonard Medal; Members of National Academy Science and American Academy Arts and Science Asteroid named in honor: (7004) Markthiemens
- Scientific career
- Fields: Physical chemistry of isotope effects, Solar system origin and evolution, Lunar and planetary science, Climate change, Origin and evolution of life
- Workplaces: University of California San Diego
- Doctoral advisor: Garrett W. Brass
- Other academic advisors: Robert N. Clayton (post-doctoral advisor)

Mark Howard Thiemens is an American geophysicist and chemist, best known for his co-discovery of mass-independent fractionation in 1983 and research into planetary evolution and the atmospheric chemistry of climate change. He is a Distinguished Professor and the John Doves Isaacs Endowed Chair in Natural Philosophy of Physical Sciences at the University of California, San Diego in the former Department of Chemistry and Biochemistry, which split in July 2026 into the Departments of Chemistry and of Biochemistry and Molecular Biophysics. He was elected to the National Academy of Sciences in 2008 and the Royal Society in 2024. For his contributions to geochemistry he was awarded the Leonard Medal in 2017, and the Magellanic Premium in 2026.

His studies have crossed a broad range of topics including basic physical and quantum chemistry, solar system development, the origin and evolution of life on early Earth, stratospheric chemistry, climate change and greenhouse gas identification, Martian atmospheric chemistry, past and future and isotope geochemistry. His work combines photochemical isotope studies, both laboratory and synchrotron based, field work in the South Pole, Greenland Summit and the Tibetan Himalayas for climate and geological sampling across China for early Earth rock records.

His non-isotope work has included discovery of an unknown source of the greenhouse gas nitrous oxide that lead the global industrial elimination of all emissions, a major contribution to changing global climate change. Thiemens has worked on developing new imaging techniques for space mission return samples and detection of superconductivity in nature.

== Education ==
Thiemens earned his bachelor of Science degree from the University of Miami. His studies with isotope geochemist Cesare Emiliani, PhD student of Harold Urey and a co-discoverer of paleoclimate temperature determination stimulated his interests in isotopes. Thiemens received a MS from Old Dominion University and PhD from Florida State University for his research using stable isotopes and particle identification using the FSU Van de Graff accelerator. He moved to the University of Chicago at the Enrico Fermi Institute for Nuclear Studies (1977–1980) where he worked with Robert N. Clayton using lunar samples to track solar wind origin and evolution, meteorite cosmochemistry, and early atmospheric chemistry.

== Career ==
Thiemens moved to the department of chemistry at the University of California, San Diego in 1980, where he was hired as an assistant professor as a replacement for Hans Seuss and took over the laboratory of Nobel Laureate Harold Urey. He was promoted to full professor in 1989, and served as the chair of the department of chemistry and biochemistry from 1996 to 1999. He was the founding dean of the division of physical sciences and served from 1999 to 2016.

== Research ==
Thiemens' research at UCSD initiated after a rebuild of the Urey isotope ratio mass spectrometer to allow measurement of both oxygen isotope ratios (^{18}O/^{16}O, ^{17}O/^{16}O). His first publication as an assistant professor reported in Science the first mass independent isotope effect which occurred during ozone formation. This was the first demonstration of a chemical process that could alter isotope ratios in a manner independently of mass difference. Most strikingly was that the pattern of mass independent and the ^{17}O/^{16}O,^{18}O/^{16}O variation varied equally and reproduced the same pattern observed in primitive inclusions of the Allende carbonaceous chondritic meteorite. The underlying assumption for the inclusions anomaly deriving from a nucleosynthetic component was incorrect and new models for early Solar System formation were needed and have evolved since. Much of Thiemens research has been dedicated to experimentally exploring the relevant fractionation processes that may account for the observations; including synchrotron photodissociation effects in CO. The gas to particle formation process of the first solids in the nebula have also experimentally been shown to produce the mass independent anomaly. Meteoritic material studies of Thiemens in sulfur isotopes have shown that sulfonic acids from chondritic meteorites have shown that photochemical processes have been important contributor to their molecular synthesis as well other sulfur species. To interpret mass independent isotope effects during photodissociation, Thiemens has worked in collaboration with Raphy Levine of Hebrew University to interpret mass independent isotope effects during photodissociation and better explore the fundamental chemical physics of the processes. The understanding of the basis of the ozone effect has been extensively studied by Nobel Laureate Rudy Marcus and catalyzed deeper insight into the chemical physics.

Thiemens has worked broadly on understanding the Earth system. Thiemens and Trogler identified a source of 10% of the increasing emissions of nitrous oxide, a greenhouse gas with a radiative forcing 200 times CO_{2} on a per molecules basis and a 100-year plus lifetime with unidentified sources. It was shown that the manufacture of adipic acid, used in nylon production is a globally important source. In the year post publication, a global inter industry consortium banded together to eliminate all N2O emissions, with far reaching climate impact.

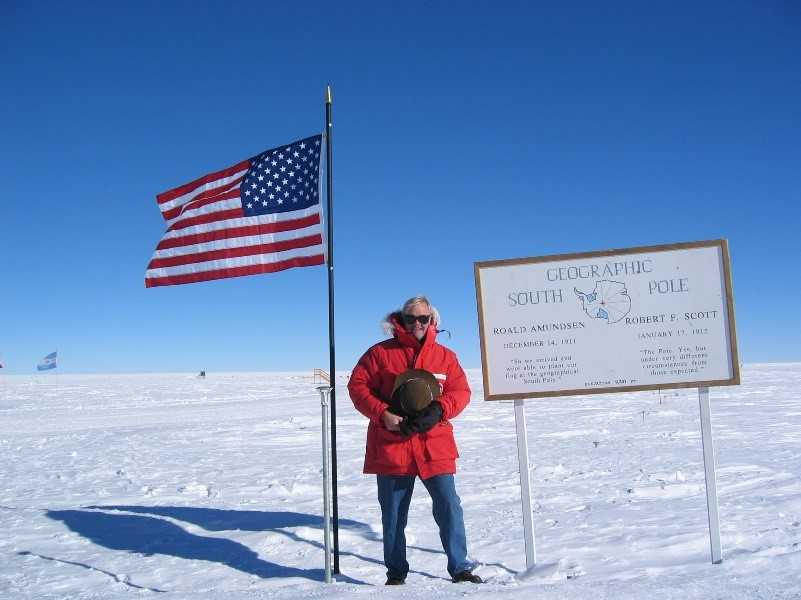
Thiemens at South Pole marker on expedition to dig snow pit for isotope record

Thiemens work in atmospheric chemistry has had extensive impact. The atmospheric chemistry of oxygen isotopes has been used to define atmospheric ozone surface reactions on Mars across billion-year time scales and the oxygen isotopic carbonate record on Mars has been measured to deepen insight into reservoir mixing. Terrestrial atmospheric carbonate aerosol oxygen isotopic measurements allow heterogenous reaction chemistry in both atmospheres to be resolved. Mass independent sulfur isotopes in Mars meteorites were used to show ultra violet SO_{2} photochemical reactions in the past Martian atmosphere.

The Mars sulfur observations lead to one of the most important applications of the isotope effects. In the present Earth's atmosphere, the need for UV light to carry out SO_{2} photodissociation does not allow occurrence in today's lower atmosphere because of stratospheric ozone screening of UV light, but in a reduced oxygen atmosphere UV should pass through. Measurement of sulfur isotopes in the Earths earliest rock record revealed that large and variable mass independent sulfur isotope effects occur in ^{33}S/^{32}S, ^{36}S/^{32}S ratios, as observed in Mars meteorites and laboratory experiments. The short atmospheric lifetime of SO_{2} photochemistry is produced only with lowered O_{2}-O_{3} level. For first time, oxygen levels in the earliest Earth could be determined. The sulfur work is widely used to track the origin and evolution of life.

Present day sulfur isotopic anomalies in sulfate from Antarctic and Greenland ice have been used to determine the influence of massive volcanoes on the stratosphere. Samples from a snow pit dug by Thiemens and colleagues have shown that there exist sources of sulfur chemistry that need to be included in studies of the atmosphere today and in the early Earth.

The inclusion of radiogenic ^{35}S with the 4 stable sulfur isotopes have further enhanced mechanistic details of the contributors to the fractionation processes in the pre Cambrium era and today. An atmospheric sulfur anomaly is observed in diamonds and uniquely tracks atmosphere-mantle mixing dynamics on billion-year time scales.

Thiemens has used oxygen isotopes to study oxygen chemistry of the stratosphere and mesosphere using a rocket borne cryogenic whole air sampler. The intersection of O(^{1}D) from ozone photolysis exchange with CO_{2} and passes the isotopic anomaly to be used as a tracer. The small effect in the O_{2} is removed by the process of photosynthesis and respiration and allows a new, highly sensitive way to quantify global primary productivity (GPP) in the world's oceans and, from oxygen trapped in ice cores across long time periods.

Using mass independent oxygen isotopes Thiemens and colleagues have applied them to further identify N_{2}O sources. Thiemens developed the ability to measure naturally produced ^{35}S (87-day half-life) to provide the first trans Pacific atmospheric Fukushima emissions and calculate the reactor neutronicity. Recently the method determined melting rates of the Tibetan Himalayan glaciers, the source of drinking water of 40% of the Earth's population. Thiemens has recently shown with his colleagues the first detection of superconductivity in nature, in this case in meteorites.

== Service ==
Besides his service as chair and Dean, Thiemens has been active in external service:

- Board of directors, San Diego State University Research Foundation, 2006–2009
- City of San Diego Science Advisory Board (2002–2005)
- San Diego Natural History Museum Board of Trustees (2001–2006)
- San Diego Chamber of Commerce Environmental Advisory Board 1998–1999.
- ECO AID Board of Advisors (1999–2002)
- Science Advisory Board. Office of Trade and Business Development. San Diego (2002)
- Kyoto Prize Symposium San Diego organizing committee, UCSD Lead. 2006–2016.
- Council, The Meteoritical Society, 2008–2011.
- Committee on the Significance of International Transport of Air Pollutants (2008–2009) National Research Council. (Global Sources of Local Pollution Report)
- Understanding the Impact of Selling the Helium Reserve (2008–2009). National Research Council (Selling the Nations Helium Reserve Report) National Research Council
- Planetary Protection Committee. Mars Sample Return (2008–2009). National Research Council (Assessment of Planetary Protection for Mars Sample Return Mission)
- Committee for Planetary Protection Standards for Icy Bodies in the Outer Solar System (2011) National Research Council
- Board on Energy and Environmental Systems 2009–2016. National Academy of Sciences.
- Searching for Life Across Space and Time. (2016–2017). Space Science Board Requested study.
- Space Sciences Board (2014–present). National Academy of Sciences
- Executive committee, Space Sciences Board (2018—present) National Academy of Sciences.
- Associate editor, Proceedings National Academy of Sciences, 2007 to present. National Academy of Sciences

== Honors ==
- Dreyfus Foundation Teacher- Scholar Award (1986)
- Alexander Von Humboldt Fellows Award (1990)
- Alexander Von Humboldt Award (1993)
- Elected, Fellow of the Meteoritical Society (1996)
- Ernest O. Lawrence Medal, Department of Energy (1998)
- Chancellors Associates Endowed Chair (1999–present)
- American Chemical Society (San Diego) Distinguished Scientist of the year (2002)
- Elected, Fellow, American Academy of Arts and Sciences (2002)
- Distinguished Alumni Award, Old Dominion University (2003)
- Press Club Headliner of the Year 2002 (2003)
- Selected, San Diego City Beat, 33 People to Watch in 2003 (2003)
- Creative Catalyst Award, UCSD-TV (2003)
- Elected, Phi Beta Kappa (2005)
- Elected, National Academy of Sciences (2006)
- Minor Planet Named in his Honor: Asteroid (7004) Markthiemens. International Astronomical Union (2006).
- Elected, Fellow American Geophysical Union (2006).
- Elected, Fellow, Geochemical Society (2007)
- Elected, Fellow, European Association for Geochemistry (2007)
- Graduate Made Good, Distinguished Alumni, Omega Delta Kappa Honor Society, Florida State University (2007)
- V.M. Goldschmidt Medal; The Geochemical Society. Awarded in Davos, Switzerland (2009)
- Selected one of 100 Distinguished Graduates in 100 years of Florida State University History (2010).
- Cozzarelli Prize, U.S. National Academy of Sciences for outstanding paper in Physical Sciences in the Proceedings of the National Academy of Sciences (2011).
- Elected Fellow, American Association Arts and Sciences (2013).
- Albert Einstein Professor, Chinese Academy of Sciences (2014).
- Leonard Medal of the Meteoritical Society (2017)
- Miller Visiting professor, University California Berkeley (2017)
- Gauss Professorship, Göttingen Academy of Sciences, Germany (2017)
- Gauss Professorship, Göttingen Academy of Sciences, Germany (2020)
- Foreign Member, Royal Society (2024)
- Magellanic Premium (2026)
