= Magellanic Premium =

American science award

Magellanic Gold Medal, front

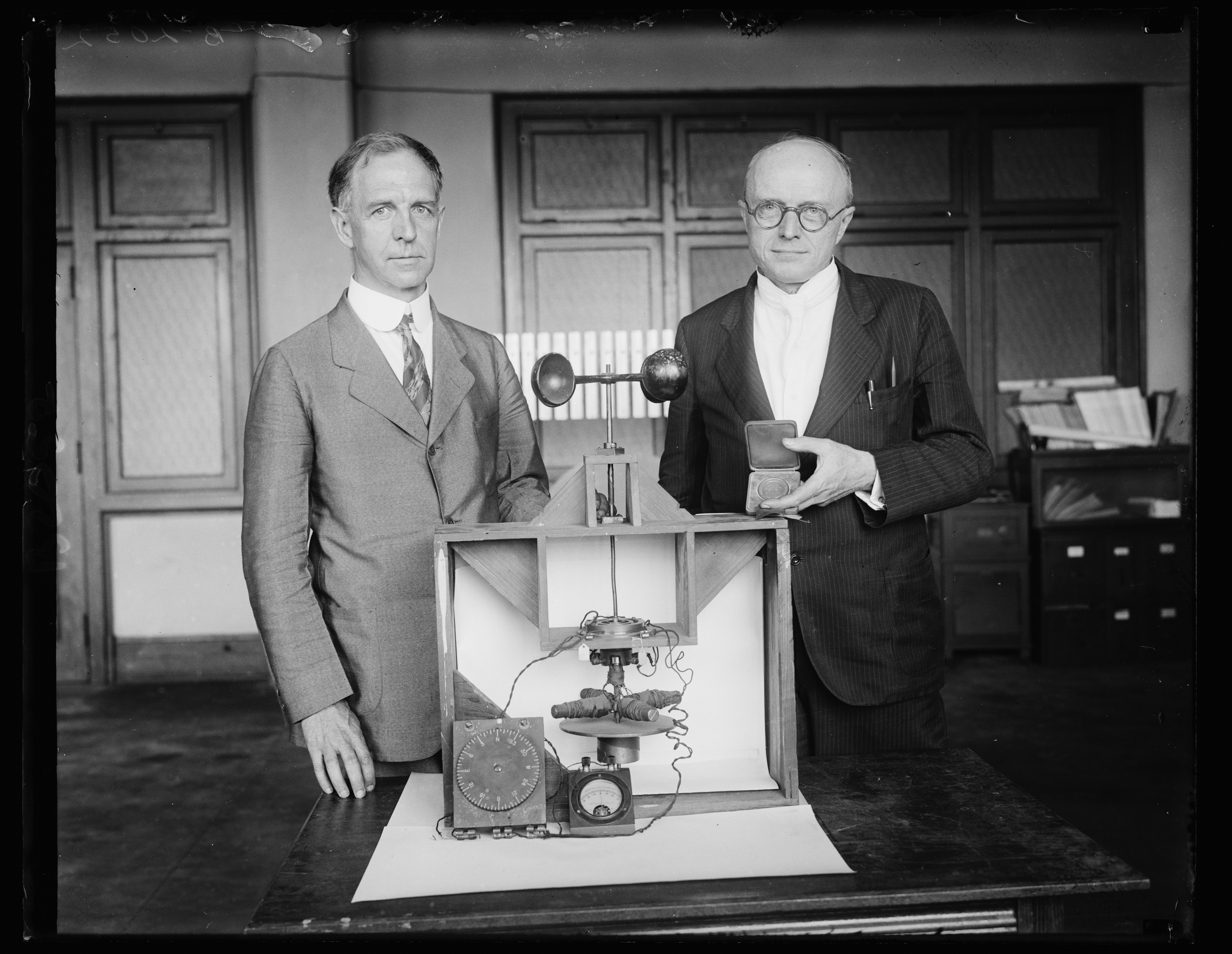
Lyman James Briggs (left) and Paul R. Heyl with the medal, 1922

The Magellanic Premium, also known as the Magellanic Gold Medal and Magellanic Prize, is awarded for major contributions in the field of navigation (whether by sea, air, or in space), astronomy, or natural philosophy.

The Premium was established in 1786 through a grant by Jean-Hyacinthe Magellan (Portuguese: João Jacinto de Magalhães). Benjamin Franklin, then President of the American Philosophical Society, accepted it and established the terms of reference under which it would be given.

In the 217 years since Magellan offered the Premium, the APS has awarded on only 36 occasions (as of 2021): twelve for navigation, twelve for natural philosophy, and eleven for astronomy.

== Recipients of the Magellanic Premium ==
Source: American Philosophical Society

- 1790 Francis Hopkinson
- 1792 Robert Patterson and William Thornton
- 1795 Nicholas Collin
- 1804 William Mugford and Benjamin Smith Barton
- 1807 John Garnett
- 1809 James Humphries
- 1820 Josiah Chapman
- 1823 James Ewing
- 1825 Charles D. Brodie
- 1836 James P. Espy
- 1864 Pliny Earle Chase
- 1887 Lewis M. Haupt
- 1922 Paul R. Heyl and Lyman James Briggs
- 1952 James Gilbert Baker
- 1953 Philip Van Horn Weems
- 1956 Karl von Frisch
- 1959 Charles Stark Draper
- 1960 Stuart William Seeley
- 1961 Edward L. Beach, Jr.
- 1966 William Hayward Pickering
- 1971 Paul M. Muller and William L. Sjogren
- 1975 Robert Herman and Ralph A. Alpher
- 1980 Martin Lindauer
- 1984 J. Frank Jordon
- 1988 George C. Weiffenbach and William H. Guier
- 1990 Joseph H. Taylor
- 1992 Edward C. Stone
- 1994 Gordon H. Pettengill
- 1997 Bradford W. Parkinson and Roger L. Easton
- 2000 S. Jocelyn Bell Burnell
- 2002 Wendy Freedman
- 2004 John E. Carlstrom
- 2008 Margaret J. Geller
- 2014 Alar Toomre
- 2018 Sandra Faber and Fabiola Gianotti (the latter presented in 2021)
- 2021 Sara Seager
- 2024 Barbara Wold
- 2026 Mark Thiemens

== See also ==
- List of general science and technology awards
