= Townsend House (Washington, D.C.) =

Historic house in Washington, D.C., United States

- Richard H. Townsend House
- U.S. National Register of Historic Places
- U.S. Historic district – Contributing property
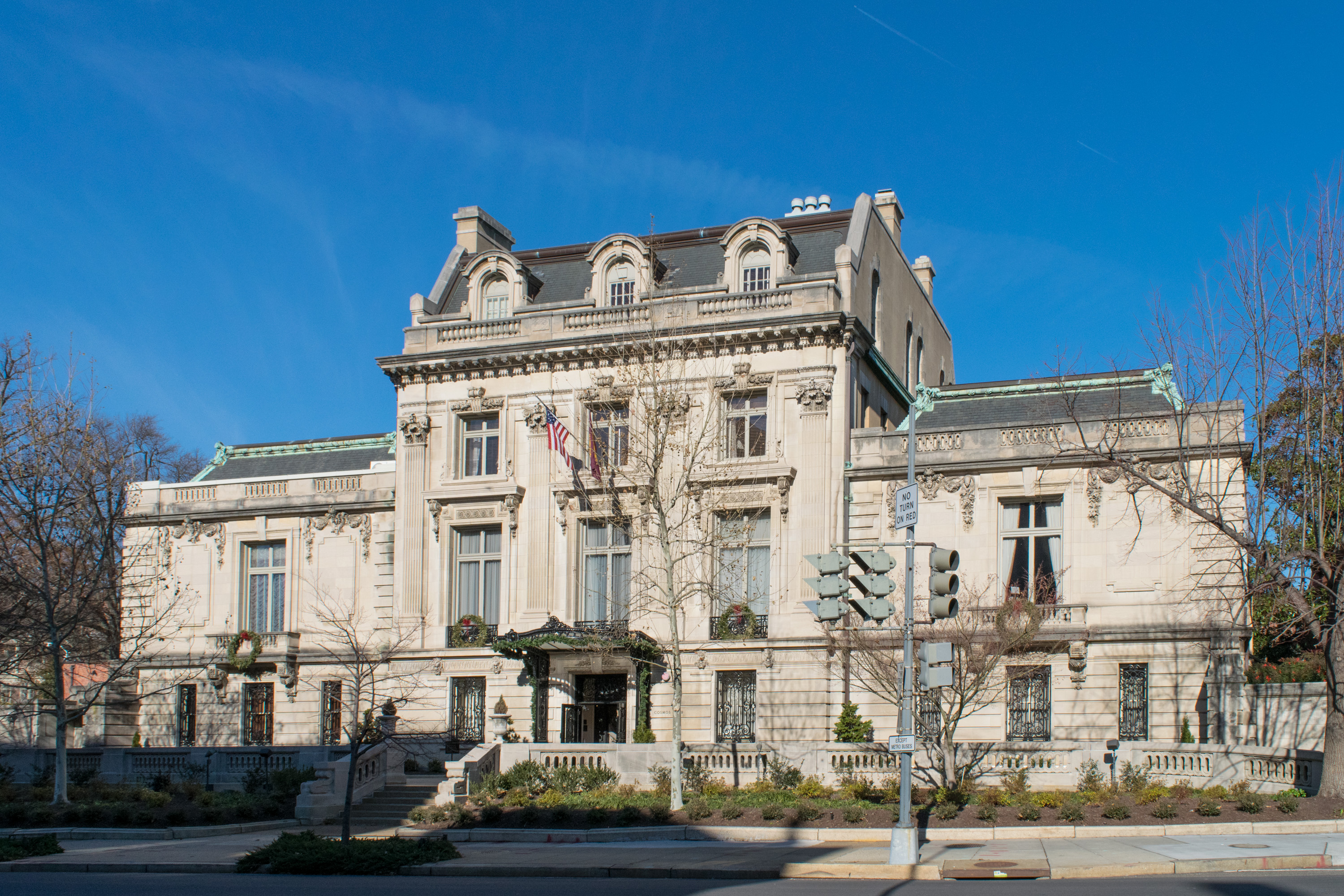

- Location within Washington, D.C.
- Location: 2121 Massachusetts Avenue, NW, Washington, D.C.
- Coordinates: 38°54′41.3″N 77°2′51.6″W
- Built: 1901
- Architect: Carrère and Hastings
- Architectural style: Beaux Arts
- Part of: Massachusetts Avenue Historic District (ID74002166)
- NRHP reference No.: 73002079
- Added to NRHP: April 3, 1973

The Townsend House is a historic building on Embassy Row in Washington, DC. It has been the home of the Cosmos Club since 1952.

== History ==
The free-standing house, set in almost an acre of garden, was designed in the Beaux Arts French style by architects Carrère and Hastings in 1898 for Mary Scott Townsend, daughter of and heiress to William Lawrence Scott, and her husband Richard H. Townsend, moving from their previous home at 736 Jackson Place. Construction was essentially completed in 1901. Mr. Townsend died shortly thereafter, in 1902, and his wife lived in the house until her own death in 1931. The house then became the home of their daughter, Mathilde Scott Townsend, and her husband since 1925, prominent diplomat Sumner Welles, until 1939 and again in 1943, even though they spent much time in Oxon Hill Manor and abroad. The Cosmos Club purchased the property in 1950, following Mrs. Welles' death in Switzerland in 1949.

In 1933, President-elect Franklin D. Roosevelt lived briefly in the house before his inauguration. This echoed the previous generation of Townsends' renting of their Jackson Place home to President Theodore Roosevelt in 1902, during the White House renovation and construction of the West Wing.

The Townsend House was added to the National Register of Historic Places in 1973. It is a contributing property to the Dupont Circle Historic District and Massachusetts Avenue Historic District.

== See also ==
- List of Gilded Age mansions
