= Samuel Wesley Stratton =

American academic administrator (1861–1931)

Samuel W. Stratton
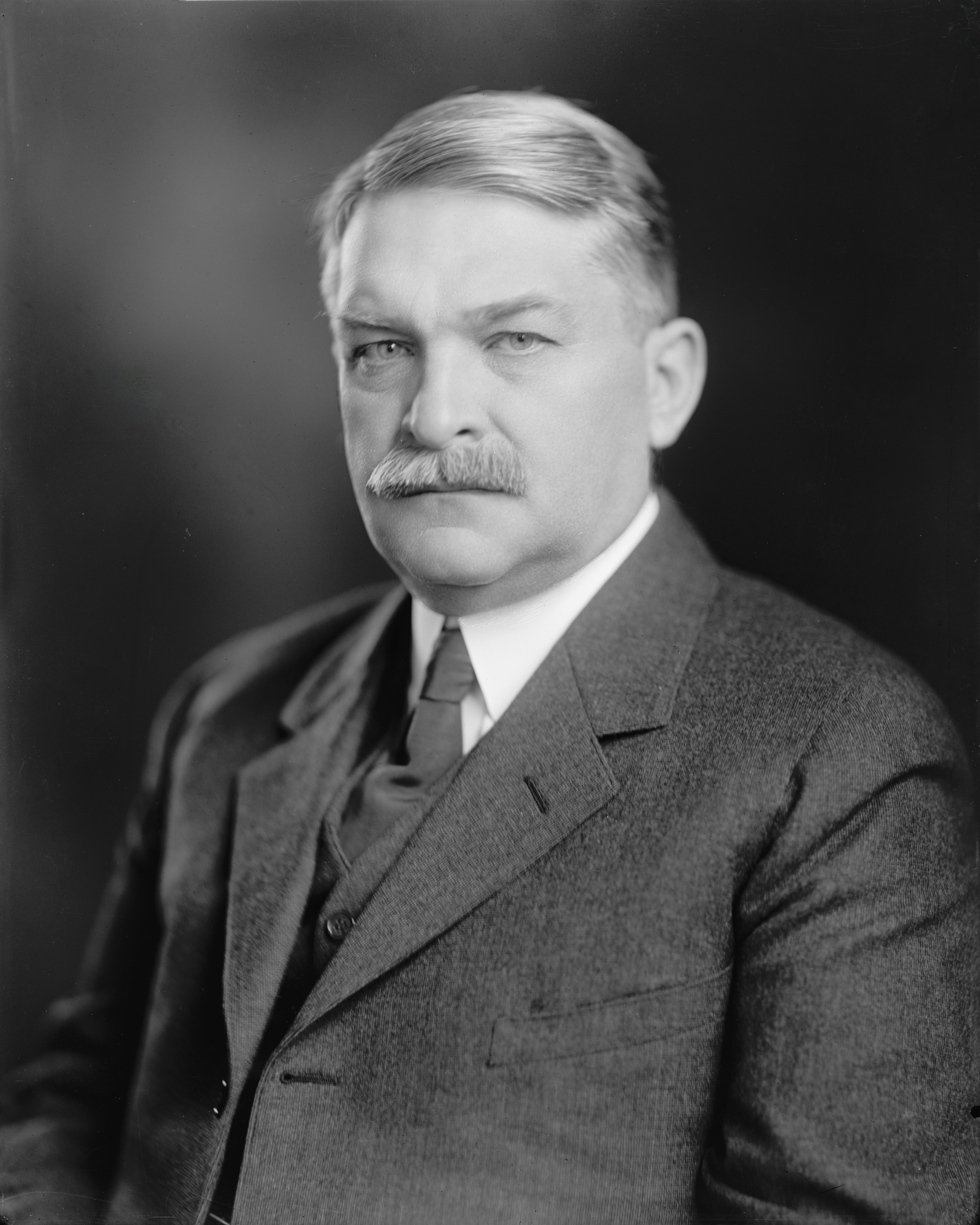
- MIT presidential portrait, 1922

8th President of the Massachusetts Institute of Technology
- In office January 1, 1923 – January 30, 1930
- Preceded by: Elihu Thomson (acting)
- Succeeded by: Karl Taylor Compton

1st Director of the National Bureau of Standards
- In office March 11, 1901 – December 31, 1922
- President: William McKinley; Theodore Roosevelt; William Howard Taft; Woodrow Wilson; Warren G. Harding
- Succeeded by: George K. Burgess

Personal details
- Born: July 18, 1861 Litchfield, Illinois, US
- Died: October 18, 1931 (aged 70) Boston, Massachusetts, US
- Resting place: Mountain View Cemetery, Altadena, California
- Education: Illinois Industrial University at Urbana
- Awards: Elliott Cresson Medal (1912); Public Welfare Medal (1917)

Academic work
- Discipline: Physics
- Institutions: University of Chicago; National Bureau of Standards; MIT

Samuel Wesley Stratton (July 18, 1861 – October 18, 1931) was an administrator in the American government, physicist, and educator. A physicist by training, Stratton proposed the U.S. Bureau of Standards and was appointed its first director by President Theodore Roosevelt. In 1923, he moved to Boston to become the eighth president of the Massachusetts Institute of Technology, a position he held for seven years.

== Life and career ==
=== From early life to professorship ===
Stratton was born on farm in Litchfield, Illinois on July 18, 1861. In his youth he kept farm machinery in repair and worked as a mechanic and carpenter. He worked his way through Illinois Industrial University at Urbana (later the University of Illinois), receiving his bachelor of science degree in mechanical engineering in 1884. He became an instructor in mathematics and physics following his graduation, and in 1889, when Physics department head Theodore B. Comstock, Professor of Mining Engineering and Physics, inexplicably failed to return to campus after the summer vacation, Stratton was appointed head of the Department of Physics by regent Selim Hobart Peabody. As Physics head, Stratton organized a formal curriculum in electrical engineering, which was taught in the Physics Department until a separate department of electrical engineering was established in 1898. Stratton moved to the University of Chicago in 1892 as Assistant Professor of Physics, then Associate Professor in 1895 and Professor in 1898.

=== From Navy to NBS ===
Stratton served in the Illinois Naval Militia from 1895, as a lieutenant in the Navy in the Spanish–American War, and from 1904 to 1912 served as commander in charge of the Naval Militia in the District of Columbia.

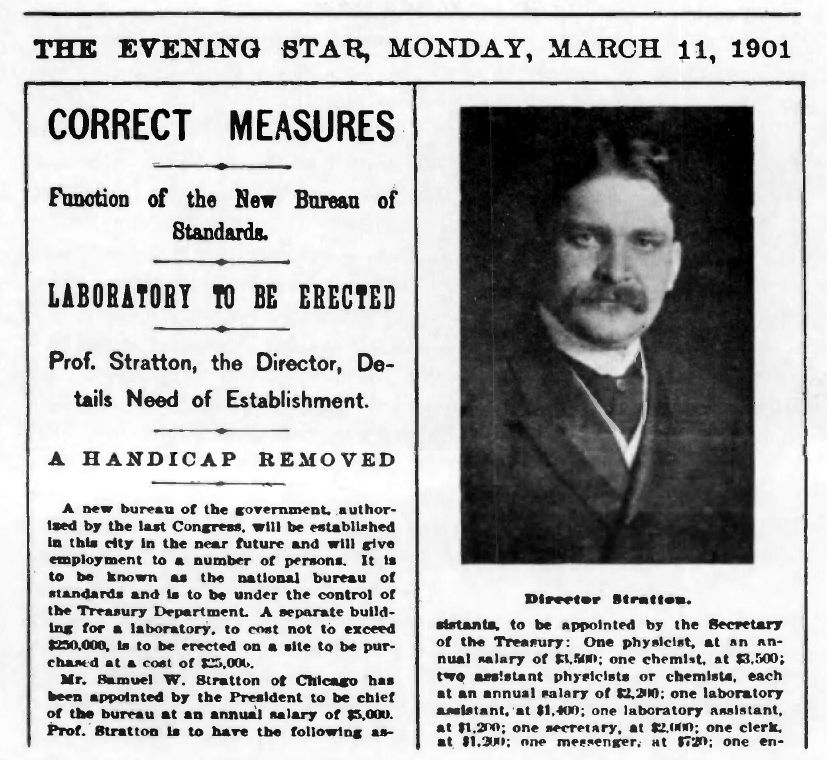
Dr. Stratton in the Evening Star, 1901

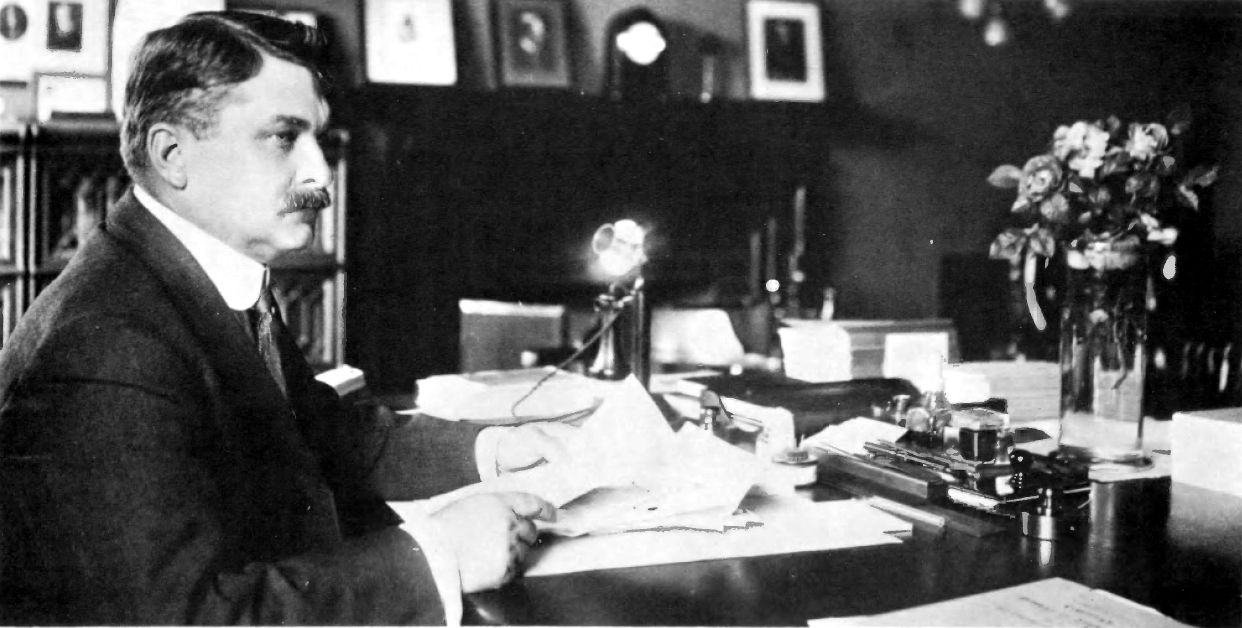
Stratton in 1905

In 1899 he was asked to head the United States Coast and Geodetic Survey's Office of Weights and Measures, where he developed the plan for the establishment of a bureau of standards. He won the support for his plans from Secretary of the Treasury Lyman J. Gage and in March 1901, President William McKinley appointed him the first director of the National Bureau of Standards (NBS). He served there until 1923. Under his leadership, NBS grew from 24 to 900 employees scattered over 14 buildings. His operation was designed to recruit recent college graduates, train them, and feed them into private industry and its higher salaries. His team was called "lowest-paid corps of first-rank scientists ever assembled by any government." The NBS worked hand in glove with industry to undertake research that the private sector required but could not finance itself.

His boss, then Secretary of Commerce (later President) Herbert Hoover had used the occasion of Stratton's departure from government service as an opportunity to bemoan the low salaries paid to government scientists.

Stratton at the Fourth Conference International Union for Cooperation in Solar Research at Mount Wilson Observatory, 1910

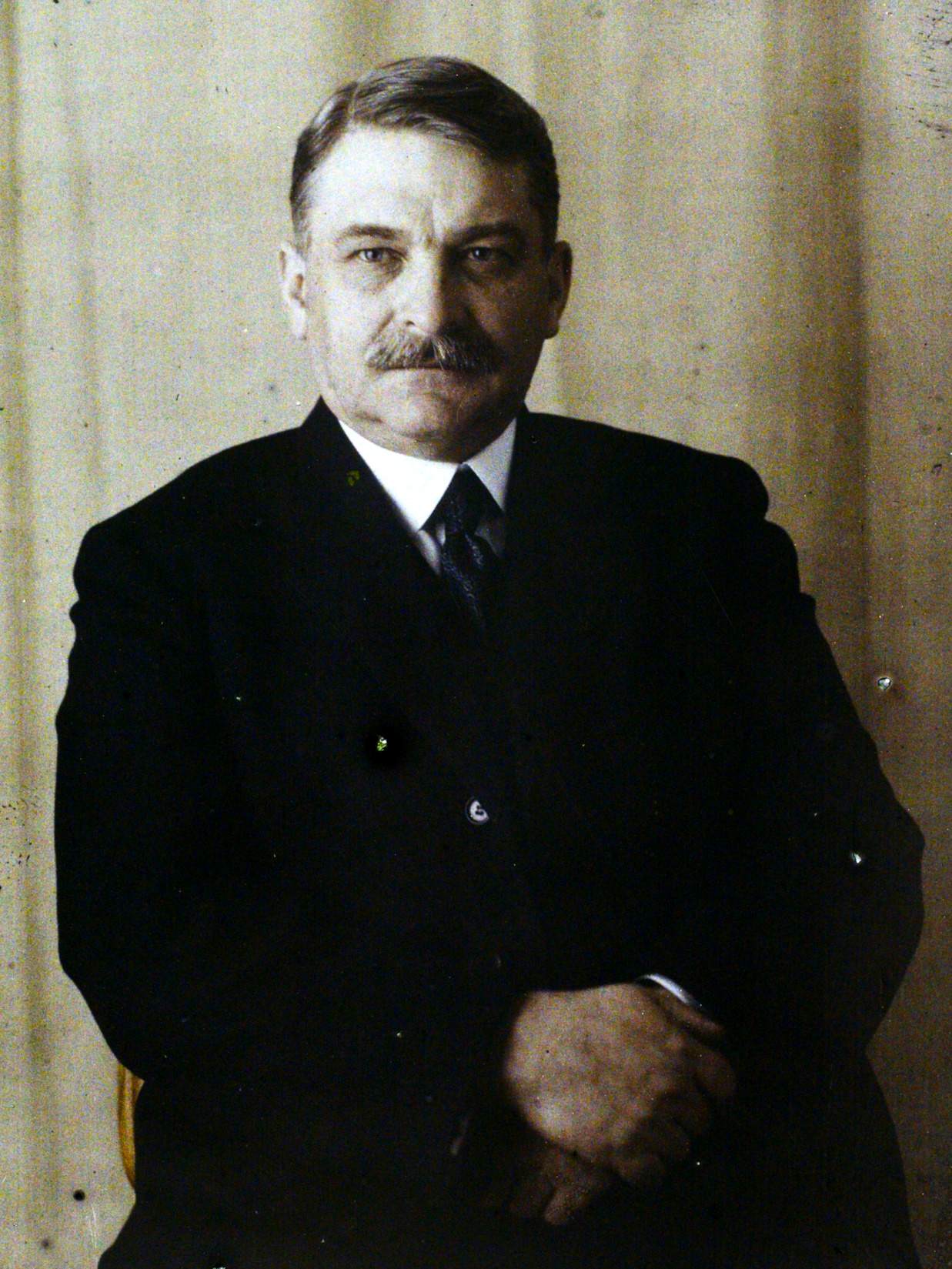
Autochrome by Auguste Léon, 1920

=== MIT years ===
In January 1923, Stratton became the eighth president of M.I.T. and served for seven years. In his inaugural address he said: "The terms pure and applied science have not the same distinction as formerly. The same men, methods and equipment are involved in getting at the facts, whether they are needed in solving problems in industry or in extending our knowledge of principles. There are few cases of the latter that do not find immediate application." Tying education to industry, he said that industry that had once been slow to seize upon scientific advances was now demanding them. As recounted by Time magazine, "he demonstrated the economic wisdom of generous support for research in pure science. He said that the automotive industry must find a substitute for gasoline, on which the elder Edison commented that the electric storage battery has already filled the bill. Edison looks for all transportation and industry to be electrified."

In 1927, Stratton served as one of three members as an Advisory Committee to Massachusetts Governor Alvan T. Fuller, along with President Abbott Lawrence Lowell of Harvard and Probate Judge Robert Grant. They were tasked with reviewing the trial of Sacco and Vanzetti to determine whether the trial had been fair. Stratton, the one member who was not a Boston Brahmin, maintained the lowest public profile of the three committee members and hardly spoke during its hearings.

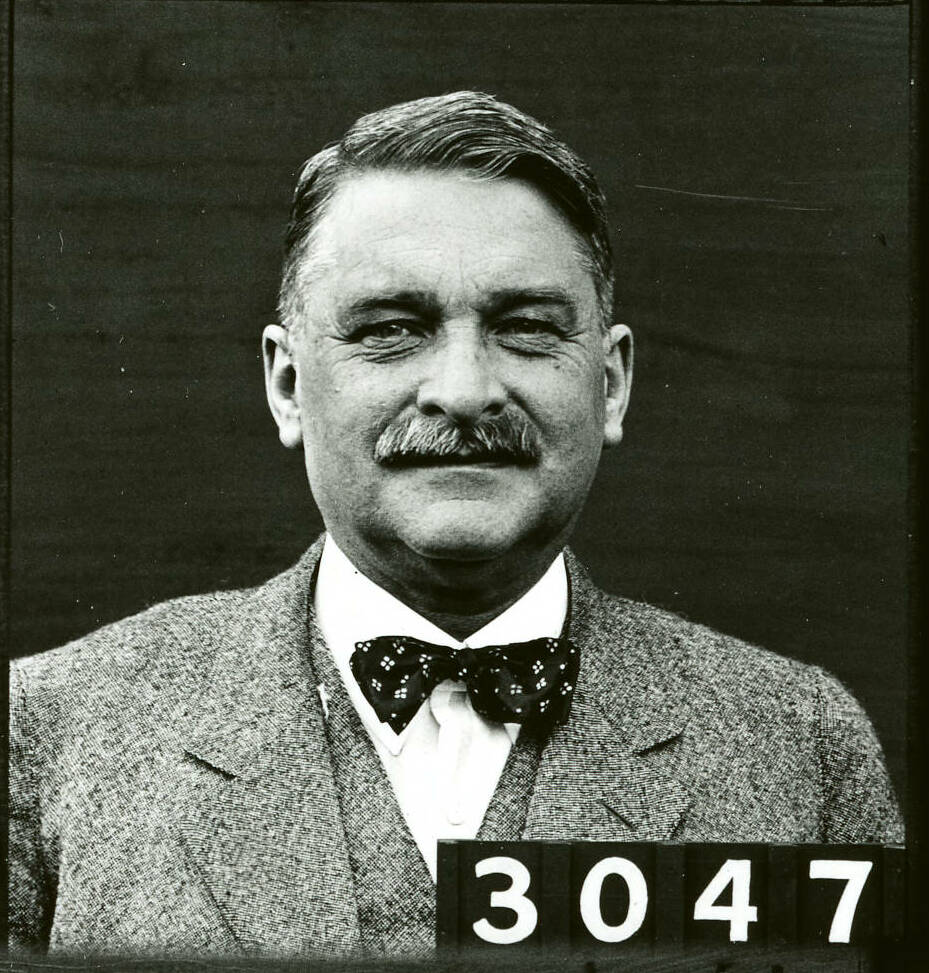
Stratton in 1918

Upon his retirement in 1930 he became the first chairman of the MIT Corporation under a new plan of organization that he had devised. A lifelong bachelor, Stratton belonged to numerous private clubs. The carpentry he learned in his youth remained a lifelong hobby.

Note that the Stratton Student Center on the MIT campus is dedicated to a different former president of MIT, Julius Adams Stratton.

=== Death ===
On October 18, 1931, Stratton died of heart disease at his home in Boston's Back Bay while dictating a tribute to his friend Thomas Edison, who died earlier in the day.

Stratton is buried at Mountain View Cemetery and Mausoleum in Altadena, California.

== Honors and awards ==
In 1904, Stratton was elected as a member to the American Philosophical Society.

Stratton was awarded the Elliott Cresson Medal of The Franklin Institute in 1912. In 1917 Stratton was awarded the Public Welfare Medal from the National Academy of Sciences. In 1922, he was elected an Honorary Member of The Optical Society.

France made him a Chevalier of the Legion of Honor in 1909, and he received honorary degrees from the University of Cambridge and Yale University among others.

Since 1962, the Commerce Department's National Institute of Standards and Technology, formerly the National Bureau of Standards, has presented the Samuel Wesley Stratton Award annually for outstanding scientific or engineering achievements in support of the objectives of the National Institute of Standards and Technology.

== Sources ==
- New York Times: "Dr. S.W. stratton, Educaor, is Dead," October 19, 1931, accessed Dec 18, 2009
- MIT: "SAMUEL WESLEY STRATTON, 1861-1931", accessed Dec 21, 2009
- MIT: "Stratton: Inaugural Address, accessed Dec. 22, 2009

Government offices
New office	1st Director of the National Bureau of Standards; 1901 – 1922	Succeeded by George K. Burgess
Academic offices
Preceded by Ernest Fox Nichols	8th President of the Massachusetts Institute of Technology; 1923 – 1930	Succeeded by Karl Taylor Compton
