= Cosmos Club =

Private social club in Washington, D.C.

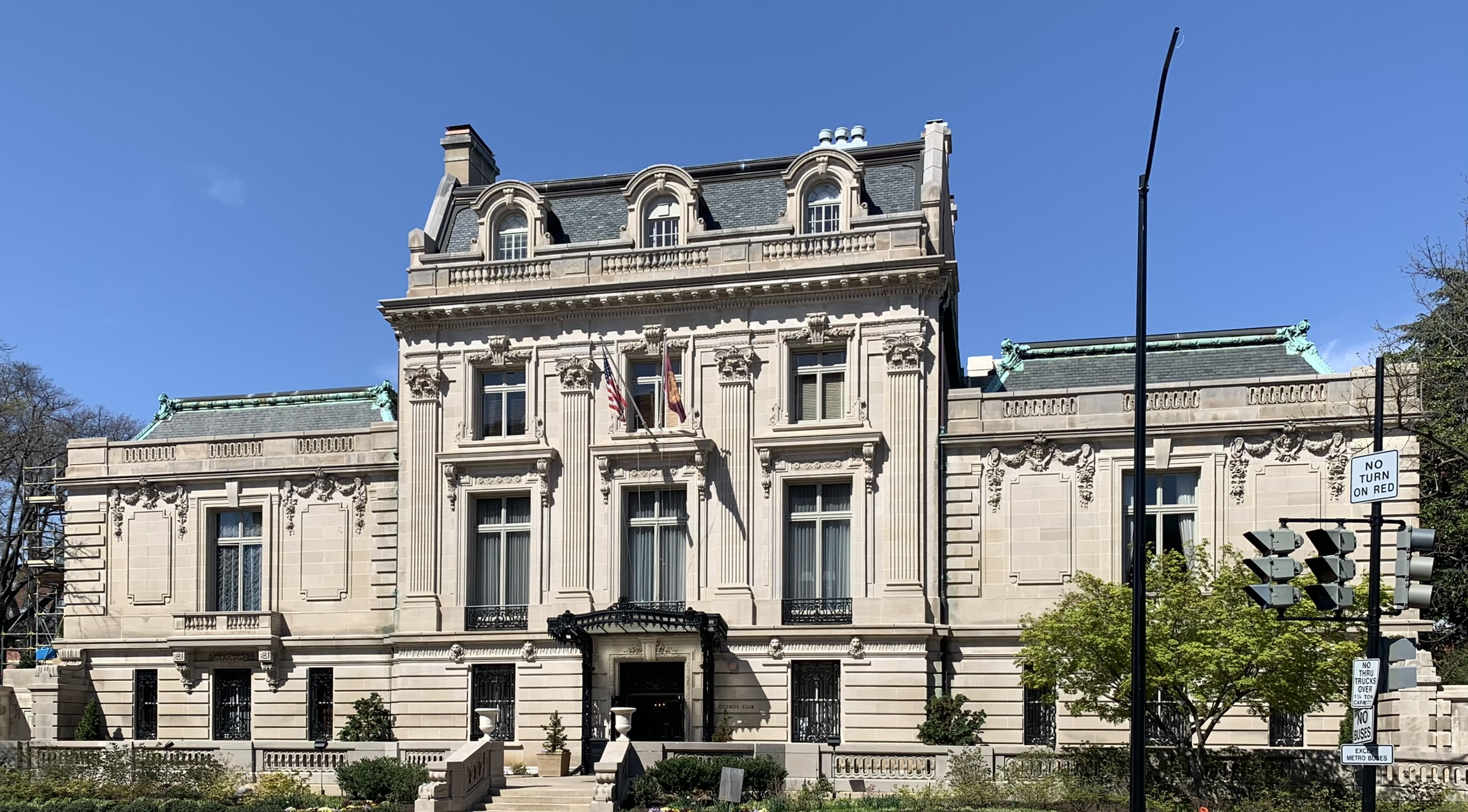
- The clubhouse in April 2022
- Formation: 1878; 148 years ago
- Type: Private social club
- Tax ID no.: 53-0052500
- Location(s): 2121 Massachusetts Avenue, NW; Washington, D.C., U.S.
- Services: Hotel (50 rooms), dining, athletics, meetings
- Website: cosmosclub.org
- Cosmos Club
- U.S. National Register of Historic Places
- Location within Washington, D.C.
- Coordinates: 38°54′41″N 77°2′52″W
- NRHP reference No.: 73002079
- Added to NRHP: April 3, 1973

The Cosmos Club is a 501(c)(7) private social club in Washington, D.C., that was founded by John Wesley Powell in 1878 as a gentlemen's club for those interested in science. Among its stated goals is, "The advancement of its members in science, literature, and art and also their mutual improvement by social intercourse."

Cosmos Club members include 3 United States presidents, 2 vice presidents, U.S. Supreme Court justices, artists, writers, businessmen, government officials, journalists, scientists, and university presidents, 36 Nobel Prize winners, 61 Pulitzer Prize winners, and 55 Presidential Medal of Freedom recipients. Founded by and for white men, the club admitted its first black member in 1963 and its first woman in 1988.

== History ==
According to one history, Clarence Edward Dutton originally had the idea for a social club for men of science, and shared his idea with Major John Wesley Powell. On November 16, 1878, a group of men met at Powell's home at 910 M Street, Washington, D.C., and discussed their mutual interest in creating what began the Cosmos Club. There are no minutes or attendance records from the organizational meeting. However, oral history says twelve attended the meeting. Ten signed the articles of incorporation three weeks later, and Powell was selected as the club's temporary president. The original incorporators included:

- Clarence Edward Dutton, geologist and Army officer
- Frederick Miller Endlich, chemist and geologist
- Henry Gannett, geographer
- Theodore Nicholas Gill, zoologist
- William Harkness, astronomer and mathematician
- Edward Singleton Holden, astronomer and mathematician
- Garrick Mallory, ethnologist and Army officer
- William Manuel Mew, physician and chemist
- John Wesley Powell, geologist, anthropologist, explorer, and Army officer
- James Clarke Welling, journalist and educator

According to the articles of incorporation, "The particular objects and business of this association are the advancement of its members in science, literature and art, their mutual improvement by social intercourse, the acquisition and maintenance of a library, and the collection and care of materials and appliances related to the above subjects."

The ten incorporators met again on January 6, 1879. They approved bylaws, regulations, and rules, and also elected Powell as the official president. They approved sixty individuals as founders; many of these were existing members of the Philosophical Society of Washington which the group feared, was considering creating its own social club. The cost to join was $25, slightly over $700 in today's money. The annual dues were set at $20 for residents and $10 for non-residents.

The original bylaws of the Cosmos Club had the following policy: "Membership in the Club was restricted by high qualification requirements and candidates were admitted only if they (1) had performed meritorious original work in science, literature, or the fine arts; (2) though not occupied in science, literature, or the fine arts, were well known to be cultivated in a special department thereof; and (3) were recognized as distinguished in a learned profession or in public service."

According to its website, election to membership in the Cosmos Club honors those deemed to have "done meritorious original work in science, literature, or the arts, or...recognized as distinguished in a learned profession or in public service".

== Clubhouse ==
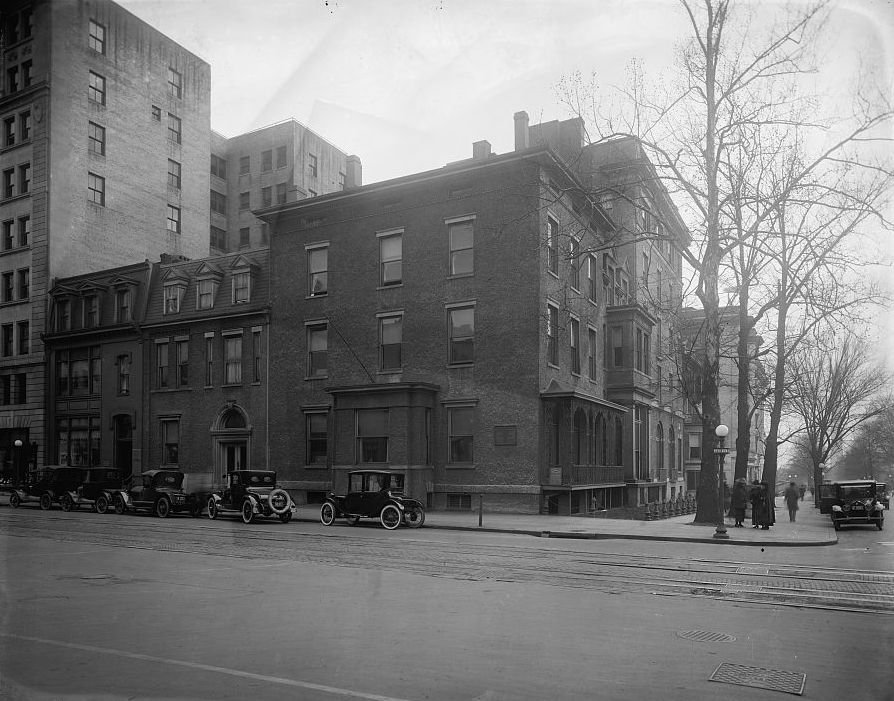
Cosmos Club at Lafayette Square, c. 1921

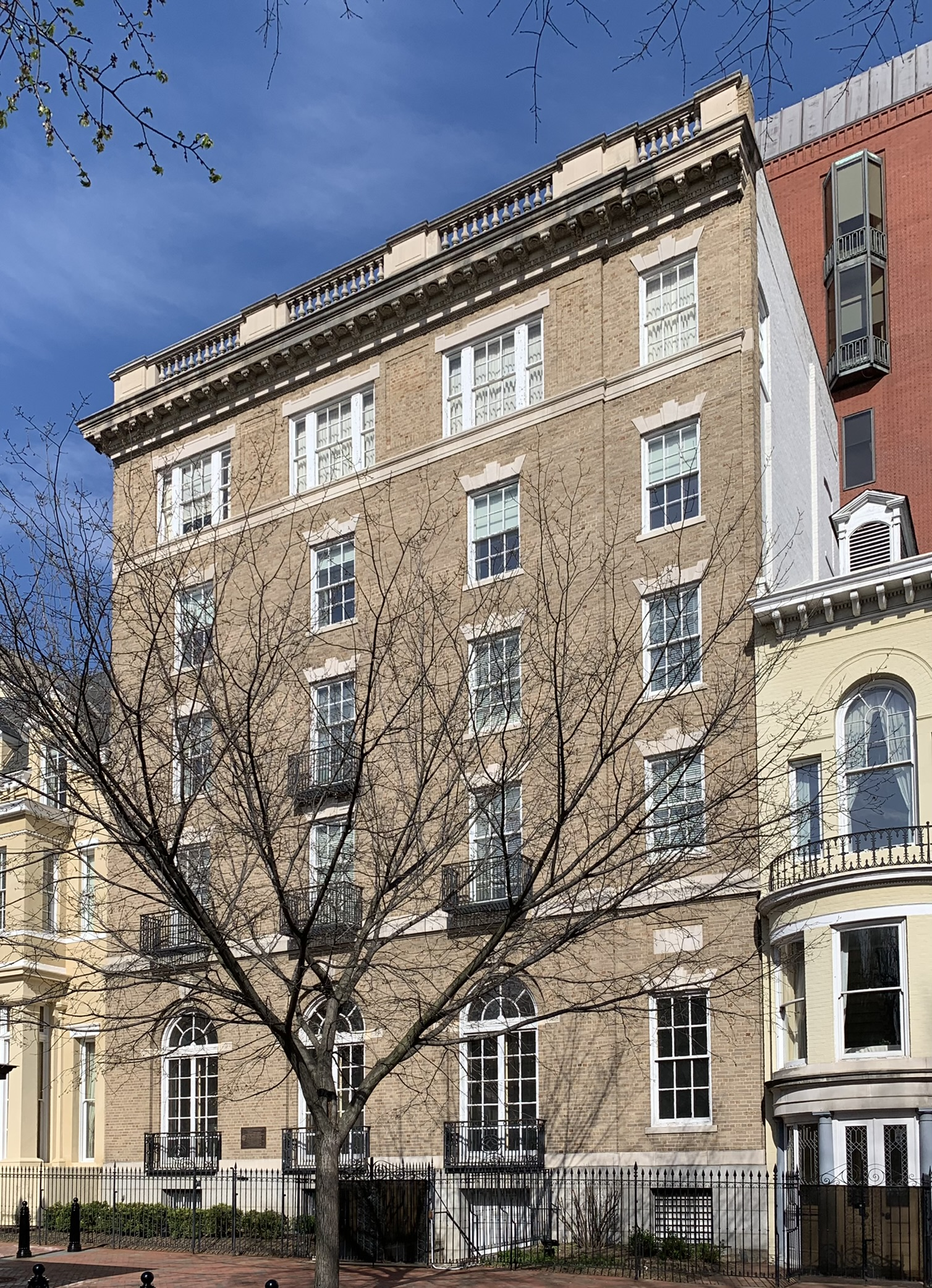
725 Madison Place

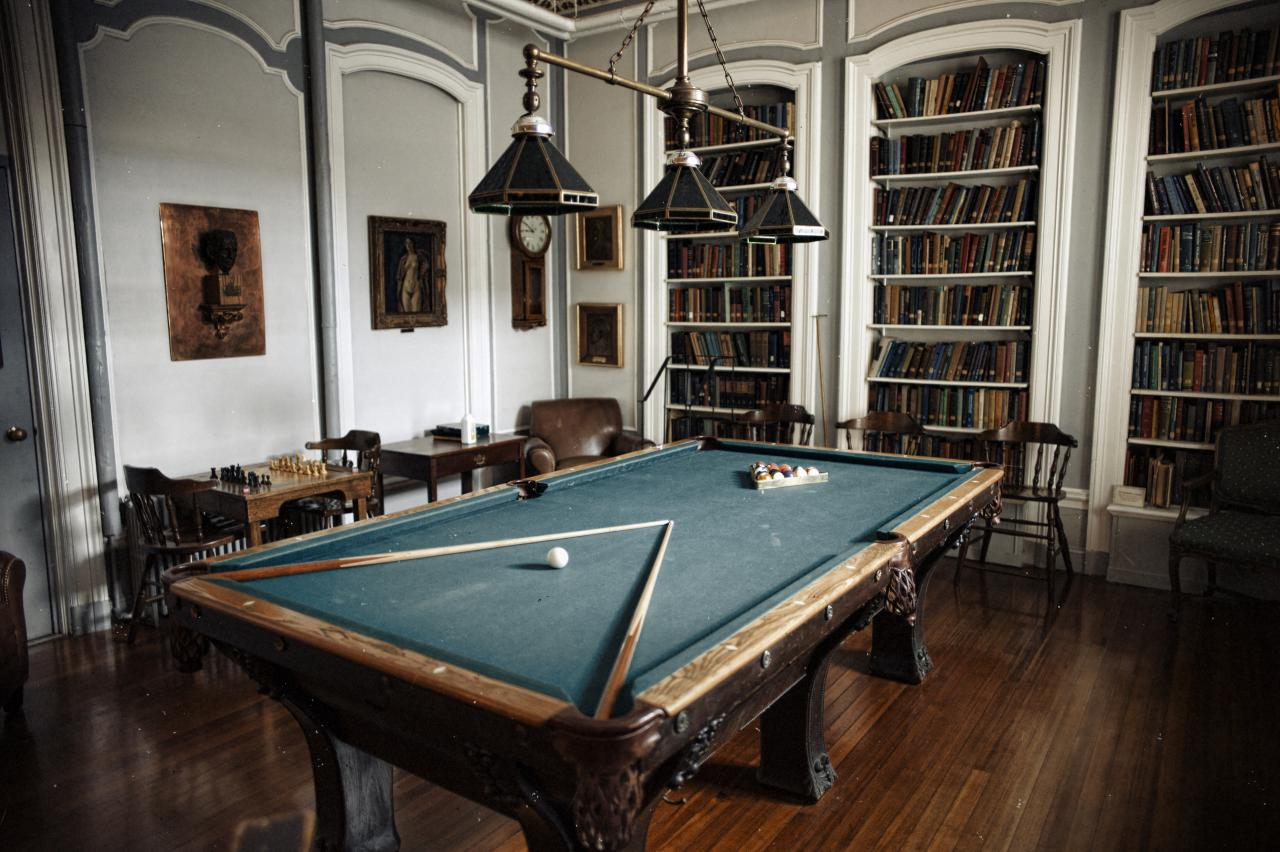
Cosmos Club on Lafayette Square

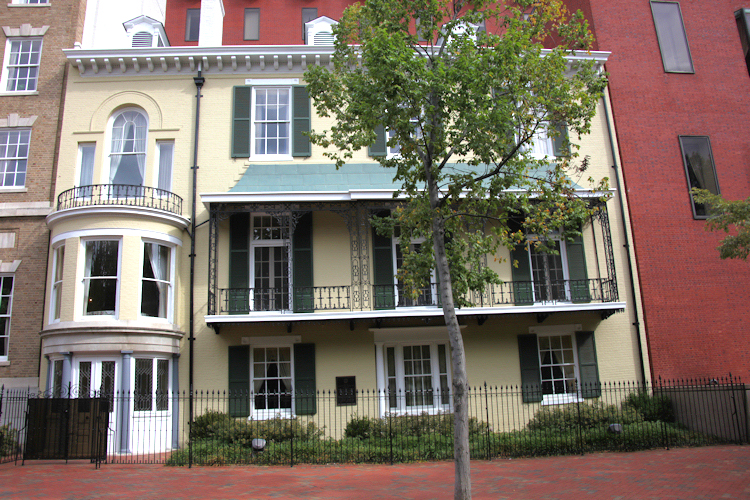
Tayloe House

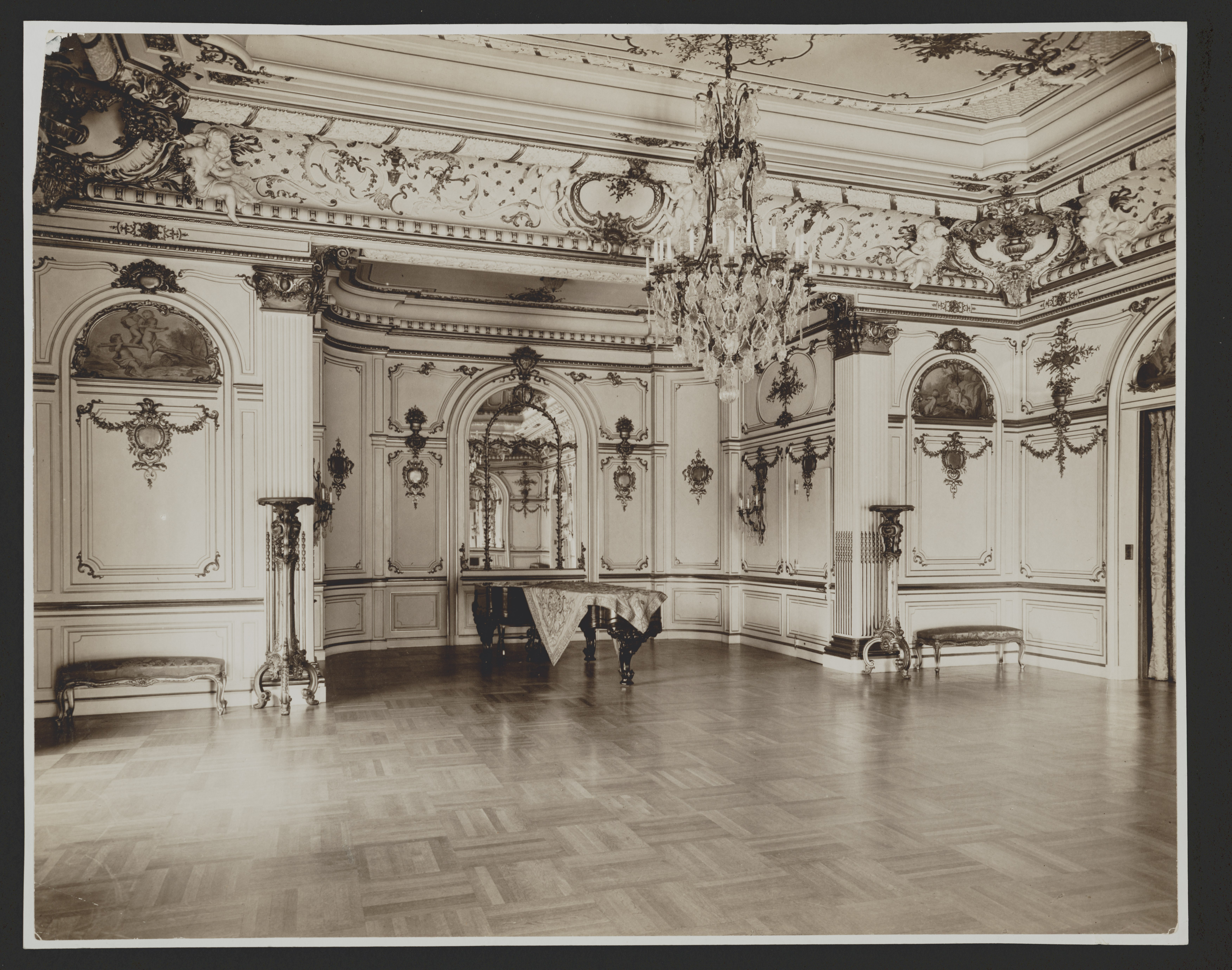
Townsend House ballroom

From 1879 to 1882, the Cosmos Club met in rented rooms on the third floor in the Corcoran Building on the corner of Pennsylvania Avenue and 15th Street NW in Washington, D.C. The club moved into a rented house at 23 Madison Place in Lafayette Square from 1883 to 1886. However, the membership quickly outgrew the space.

=== Dolley Madison House ===
On June 1, 1886, the Club purchased the Dolley Madison House for $40,000. This house is located at the corner of H Street and Madison Place. Madison's brother-in-law, Richard Cutts, built the house in 1820; Dolley Madison lived there from 1837 until her death in 1849. Upon purchasing the building, the Club built an assembly hall addition and raised the height of the third story. They held a gala on January 5, 1887, to celebrate their new home. In 1893, the Club again expanded the building, adding two stories to the assembly hall.

In 1940, the U.S. government purchased the house with the rest of the club's Lafayette Square holdings and added it to the National Courts Complex in 1952. The Cutts-–Madison House is included in the National Register of Historic Places and is a contributing building to the Lafayette Square Historic District.

=== Lafayette Square ===
In 1906, the Club purchased a house south of the Madison House at 25 Madison Place NW. In 1907, they purchased the house next door at 23 Madison Place NW—the club's former rental property. Both houses were razed in 1909, allowing the club to build a new five-story clubhouse at 725 Madison Place that was completed in 1910. This was dubbed "the new building".

They also purchased a small office building on H Street, next to the Dolley Madison House. However, in 1930, Congress directed the Secretary of the Treasury to purchase the private property on Madison Place for the expansion of governmental offices. In 1939, the government offered the Club one million dollars for all of their holdings—the Madison House, the New Building, the office building, and the Tayloe House (described below). Although its members did not want to move, the Club voted to sell on March 27, 1940.

However, with the outbreak of World War II, the government did not immediately pursue their played expansion. Instead, the club was able to rent their former property on a year-to-year basis. This arrangement was financially beneficial for the club as they no longer had to pay property taxes. Finally, the Club moved to a new location in the Townsend House in 1952.

The Lafayette Square property is now used by the United States Court of Appeals for the Federal Circuit.

=== Tayloe House ===
In 1917, the Club bought the Tayloe House, an 1828 Federal style house at 21 Madison Place NW. The Tayloe House was the club's women's annex, and its stables were converted into a meeting hall. In 1952, the Club left Tayloe House when they moved into Townsend House. The U.S. government purchased the house with the rest of the club's Lafayette Square holdings and added it to the National Courts Complex. The Benjamin Ogle Tayloe House is listed on the National Register of Historic Places and is a contributing structure to the Lafayette Square Historic District.

=== Townsend House ===
In 1950, the Club purchased the Townsend House at 2121 Massachusetts Ave., N.W. Washington, D.C. Designed by architects Carrère and Hastings, the Townsend House was built for railroad and coal heiress Mary Scott Townsend between 1898 and 1900 and features Louis XV elements on a Beaux Arts-style exterior. After renovations, the Club moved into the Townsend House in mid-1952. Townsend House includes a billiards room, dining rooms, a fitness center, a library, parlors, overnight rooms, and a periodical room. The house was listed on the National Register of Historic Places in 1973.

== Dress code ==
Members and visitors to the Cosmos Club must comply with its dress code. Men must wear dress slacks, collared long-sleeved shirts or turtlenecks, and jackets. In addition, men must wear ties in the formal dining room for dinner, lunch, and Sunday brunch. Memorial Day through Labor Day, the summer dress code permits business casual attire.

== Activities ==
=== Programs and events ===
The Cosmos Club offers book conversations, chess and bridge tournaments, monthly concerts, dancing lessons, holiday events, lunch and dinner lectures, and seasonal dinner dances. Many of the activities are related to food, such as monthly lobster dinners, weekly champagne brunches, prime rib buffets, and wine tastings. In addition, the Cosmos Club serves breakfast, lunch, and dinner for its members and their guests.

Townsend House is also used by members for special events such as anniversary parties, birthday parties, cocktail parties, debutante parties, funeral receptions, and wedding receptions.

=== Publications ===
The Cosmos Club has published the Cosmos Bulletin since around 1946. The club also publishes articles by its members in the Cosmos Club Occasional Paper Series.

From 1990 to 2004, the Cosmos Club published Cosmos: A Journal of Emerging Issues, an annual collection of essays by its members.

=== Awards ===
The Cosmos Club presents several awards and a scholarship:

- The Cosmos Club Award has been presented annually since 1964.
- John Wesley Powell Award, started in 2015 and linked to the presentation of the Powell Lecture.
- The John P. McGovern Award supports an annual series of lectures in science.
- Cosmos Scholars Grants are given by the Cosmos Foundation to college students in the Washington, D.C., area for special supplies, travel, or other expenses to enhance study in various academic fields such as biomedical sciences, engineering, literature, and regional studies.

== Related organizations ==
Many organizations were founded at the Cosmos Club, including the National Geographic Society in 1888, The Wilderness Society in 1935, and the Washington Academy of Sciences. The American Institute of Physics also formed at the Cosmos Club on May 3, 1931.

Since 1887, the Philosophical Society of Washington, also known as PSW Science, meets at the assembly hall of the Cosmos Club, now called the John Wesley Powell auditorium in honor of John Wesley Powell. The Explorer's Club, the Geological Society of Washington, the Council on Foreign Relations, and the Washington Academy of Sciences also regularly met at the Cosmos Club. Other organizations that used the Cosmos Club's facilities include The Columbia Historical Society, now the Historical Society of Washington, D.C., the Cosmotographers (a camera club), the Friday Morning Music Club, and the Literary Society of Washington.

== Membership ==
On November 16, 1903, when the Cosmos Club celebrated its 25th anniversary, the membership had grown from the original twelve to 567: 408 residents, 159 non-residents. As of 2017, the club had some 3,089 members in Full, Junior, Senior, and Emeritus categories. Members come from a wide variety of backgrounds, but a common theme among members is "a relation with scholarship, creative genius, or intellectual distinction". In 1904, president William Henry Holmes divided members into 11 groups for admission purposes:

- Science: biologists, geologists, anthropologists, physicists, chemists, and astronomers
- Writers: those who write poetry, prose, and editorials
- Artists: painters, engravers, and sculptors
- Doctors: medical doctors, dentists, physicians, and specialists
- Law: lawyers and judges
- Military: Army and Navy officers
- Education: teachers, professors, and educators
- Preachers and ministers
- Bankers and Financiers
- Architects
- Government: statesmen, diplomats, secretaries, directors, chiefs, superintendents, chief clerks, hold officers

The club was only for white men until the 1960s. In 1962, the club's refusal to admit Black journalist and high-ranking State Department official Carl T. Rowan prompted members such as Bruce Catton and John Kenneth Galbraith to resign their memberships in protest. Edward R. Murrow and John F. Kennedy withdrew their applications for membership. Less than a year later, the Club admitted its first black member, historian John Hope Franklin.

For 110 years, the Cosmos Club did not permit women to join, and it did not allow female guests to enter by the front door, or to enter rooms reserved for members. In 1973, 1975, and 1980, the Club voted against admitting women. In 1987, the Washington, D.C., Human Rights Office ruled that there was probable cause to believe that the club's men-only policy violated the city's anti-discrimination law. The office was ready to order public hearings on the case, which could have resulted in the loss of all city licenses and permits if the all-male policy had continued. However, on June 19, 1988, the Cosmos Club's membership overwhelmingly voted to accept women members—only 14 of the 771 voting members were against admitting women. The first class of female members were admitted in October 1988.

In 2015, the Washingtonian reported that annual dues are around $2,000.

== Reciprocal clubs ==
Members have access to reciprocating private clubs in other communities, including the Algonquin Club in Boston, the Arlington Club in Portland, Oregon, the Cornell Club of New York, The Cliff Dwellers in Chicago, the Duquesne Club in Pittsburgh, the Down Town Association in New York City, Engineering Society of Baltimore, the Hamilton Club of Lancaster, the Harvard Club of Boston, the Harvard Club of New York City, The Lotos Club in New York City, the National Arts Club in New York City, the National Press Club in Washington, D.C., the Norfolk Yacht & Country Club in Virginia, The Players of New York City, the Penn Club of New York, Princeton Club of New York, Racquet Club of Philadelphia, St. Botolph Club in Boston, the Saint Louis Club, the University Club of San Francisco, the Williams Club in New York City, the Union Club of Boston, and the University Club of Denver.

The Cosmos Club also has reciprocal agreements with clubs in other countries, including The Athenaeum in London, the Carlton Club in London, Caledonian Club in London, the Club Financiero Génova in Madrid, The East India Club in London, Foreign Correspondents' Club in Hong Kong, The National Club in Toronto, The New Club in Edinburgh, the Oriental Club in London, Oxford and Cambridge Club in London, the Savile Club in London, Stephen's Green Hibernian Club in Dublin, The Tanglin Club in Singapore.

== See also ==
- List of traditional gentlemen's clubs in the United States
- National Register of Historic Places listings in Washington, D.C.
