= Philosophical Society of Washington =

Scientific society in Washington, D.C.

The Philosophical Society of Washington
- Formation: March 13, 1871; 155 years ago
- Founder: Joseph Henry
- Location: Cosmos Club in Washington, D.C., U.S.
- President: Larry Millstein
- Website: pswscience.org

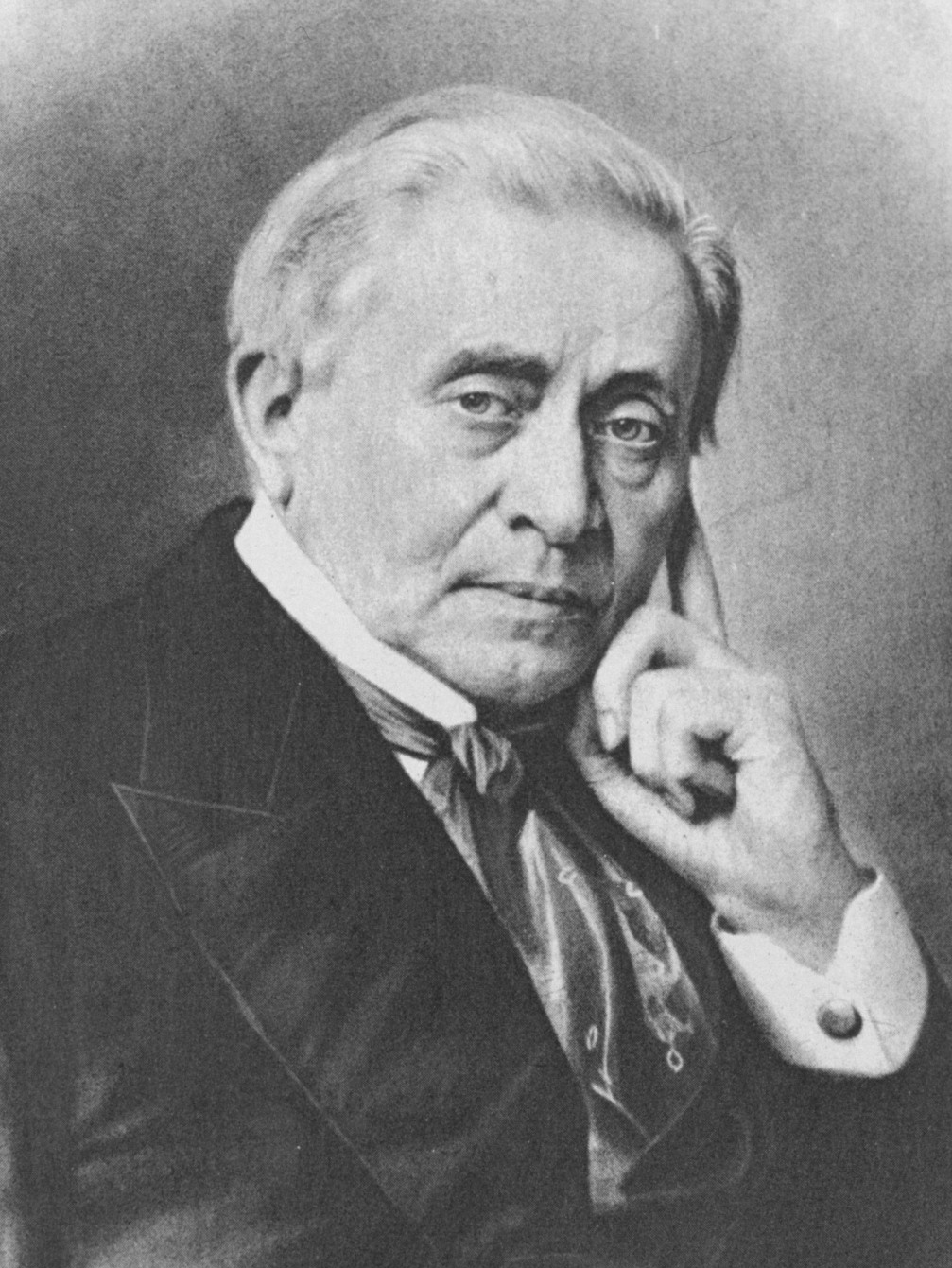
Joseph Henry, the society's first president

Founded in 1871, the Philosophical Society of Washington is the oldest scientific society in Washington, D.C. It continues today as PSW Science.

Since 1887, the Society has met regularly in the assembly hall of the Cosmos Club. In the Club's present location since 1951, the assembly hall is now called the John Wesley Powell auditorium. Meetings are roughly every other Friday, except in the summer. Meetings are free and open to the public. A lecture is given by a scientist at each meeting.

In 1931, the Society established the ongoing Joseph Henry Lecture series. The lectures present speakers at who have reached the pinnacles of their respective fields, and in recent years have included Nobel laureates Baruch Blumberg, William D. Phillips, John C. Mather, and Craig Mello.

== History ==
=== The Saturday Club ===
In 1846, the Smithsonian Institution was founded and its Regents elected Joseph Henry as the Institution’s first Secretary. In 1855, the Smithsonian Castle was completed, with space for exhibitions, research laboratories, and living quarters for Henry and his family.

Sometime before the outbreak of the Civil War, Henry and several other men interested in science formed a small club called the Saturday Club. Their meetings were held the homes of its members, and were devoted to discussion of scientific questions. Meetings followed by a social with supper and refreshments provided by the evening’s host.

The Saturday Club eventually grew to more than forty members and some found it difficult to accommodate the group in their homes. Henry recommended to resolve this difficulty by organizing a society that would be available to any man of science in Washington.

=== Founding of the Philosophical Society of Washington ===
Henry’s recommendation led Saturday Club members to formally write to Henry:

Prof. Joseph Henry, LL.D.

The undersigned respectfully request you to preside at a meeting which they propose to hold for the purpose of forming a society, having for its object the free exchange of views on scientific subjects, and the promotion of scientific inquiry among its members.

43 men signed the letter. According to former Society President W.J. Humphreys, these signers “represented…every branch of both the natural and the exact sciences.”

The signers included: mathematician Simon Newcomb; astronomer Asaph Hall; malacologist William H. Dall; Chief Engineer of the Army Andrew A. Humphreys; Quartermaster General of the Army Montgomery C. Meigs; Surgeon General Joseph K. Barnes; and Chief Justice Salmon P. Chase.

“In response to this call,” according to the minutes of the first meeting, “a meeting of the subscribers thereto was convened and held at the Smithsonian Institution, in the Regents’ room, on Monday, March 13, 1871.” The outline of a Constitution was adopted, and a General Committee was established, and officers were elected, including President Joseph Henry.

=== Early meetings ===
The next meetings of the new Society were held in the annex of the Surgeon General’s office in Ford’s Theater. In a published oral history, founding member William Dall explained the change:

Then General Barnes, who was Surgeon-General, and was one of the members, was good enough to offer us more commodious quarters in the city. In those days, coming to the Smithsonian building, especially at night, was something of a task. The paths were not paved; if it happened to be rainy it was a very muddy walk indeed…At that time, nearly all of the members of the Society lived in the city and therefore found it desirable to have the place of meeting where they would not have to go through the Smithsonian grounds, often through a considerable amount of mud.

At the second meeting, held Saturday, March 18, 1871, the first scientific paper was presented to the Society. Professor S.F. Baird communicated on behalf of the author, “Official Report of the Yellowstone Expedition of 1870.”

About the early meetings at Ford’s Theater, librarian John S. Billings remembered:

[The] entrance up the narrow stairs, often pervaded with a scientific odor from the laboratory on the lower floor – an odor once compared to that of the deluge at low tide – the devious and complicated route from the head of the stair, past the General Committee room, to the place of meeting; the rather gloomy room, walled in from floor to ceiling with books from whose dingy backs no light was reflected, and yet in its general aspects and surroundings in many respects appropriate to the objects and purposes of the company gathered therein.

The Society met at Ford’s Theater for sixteen years. Regular meetings were held on alternate Saturdays at 8:00 p.m. and were to be devoted to the consideration and discussion of scientific subjects, except for the annual meetings, when the conduct of business of the Society was discussed.

Those early meetings included presentations on a wide scope of scientific matters:

- In 1872, Benjamin Peirce and William Harkness gave presentations on the nature of the sun and its corona.
- In 1877, Alexander Graham Bell demonstrated his telephone for the Society, weeks before his patent on the “box” phone. He later told the Society of his experiments on the photophone and spectrophone.
- In 1886, Albert F. Zahm presented a paper on skin friction, years before any airplane took to the sky.
- And, in an era when travel was more difficult, members delivered accounts of their travels to the outer reaches of the Western territories and around the globe.

According to geologist Clarence E. Dutton, “[a]t those meetings, the attendance was always large for a local scientific society whose routine meetings were held for the sole purpose of reading formal papers.”

=== Residence at the Cosmos Club and later history ===
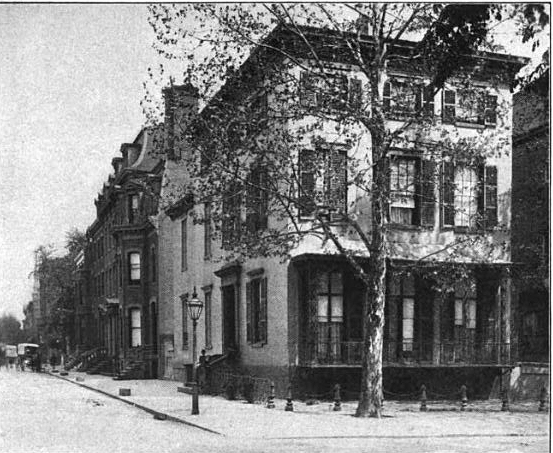
When the Cosmos Club moved in 1887 to the Dolley Madison House (shown here in 1883), the Society began holding its regular meetings there.

In 1878, the Cosmos Club was founded and all local members of the Philosophical Society were invited to join.

The Club moved to its own building, known now as the Dolley Madison House on Lafayette Square, and invited the Society to hold its meetings there. The Society accepted the invitation. Ever since the Society’s 300th meeting on March 26, 1887, the Society has held its regular meetings at the Cosmos Club and moved with the Club in 1951, to its current location in the Townsend House on Massachusetts Avenue.

The Society further evolved in the 20th Century. In 1919, after forty-eight years of meeting without refreshment, the Society sanctioned its first social hour following the formal meeting.

On March 12, 1921, one day shy of the Society’s 50th anniversary, Amelia K. Benson became the first woman to address the Society. Ms. Benson spoke about a paper she co-authored, titled, "A comparison of the International Hydrogen Scale with the standard scale of temperature defined by the platinum resistance thermometer."

And, while recording the election of new members was inconsistent before and after the Annual Meeting of 1930, the minutes of that meeting are the first to mention the election of a woman, “Miss G. Back,” to membership. More women followed, both in membership and in the president’s chair.
