= Mabel McDowell Adult Education Center =

School building in Columbus, Indiana

- Mabel McDowell Elementary School
- U.S. National Register of Historic Places
- U.S. National Historic Landmark
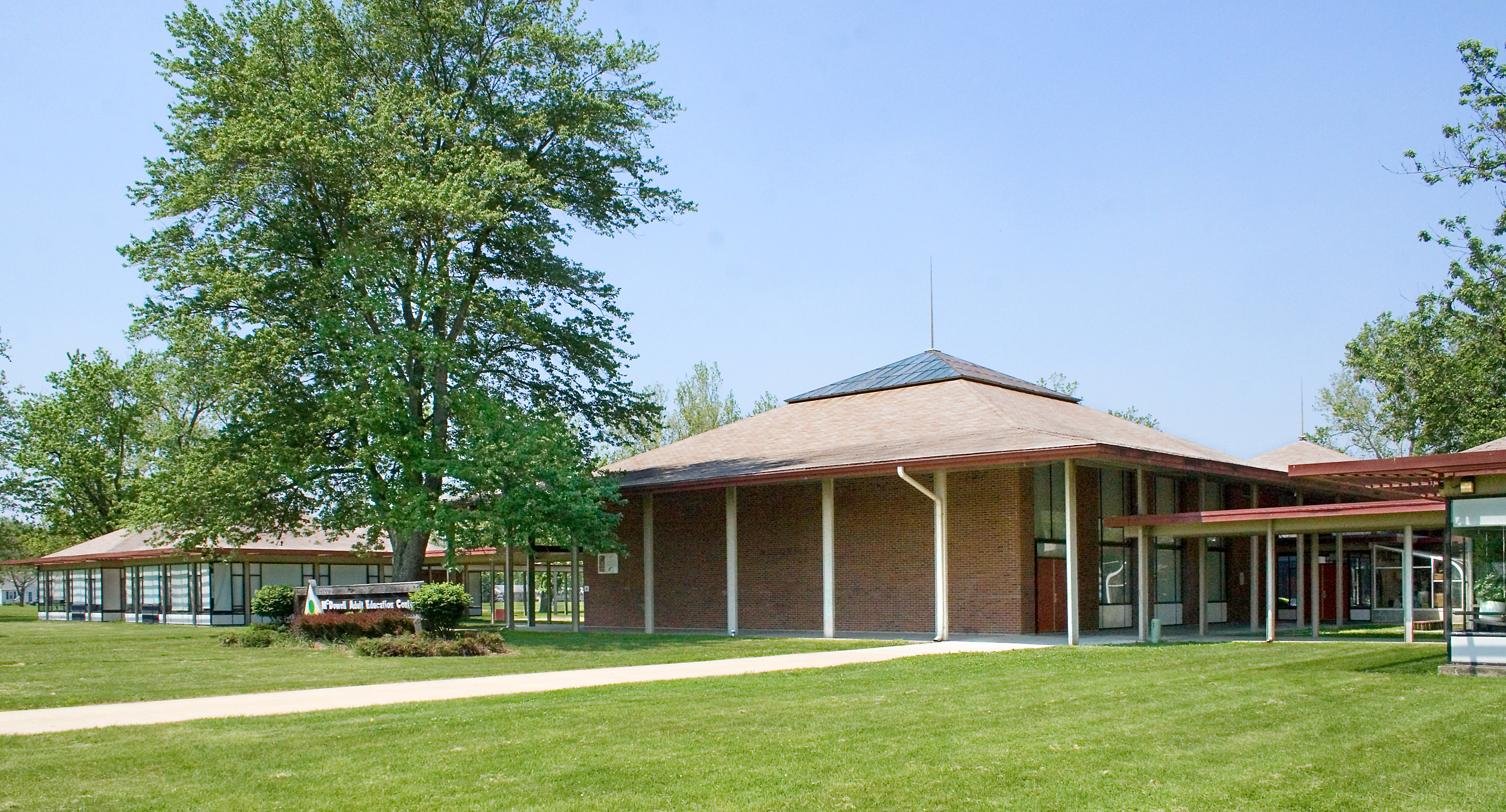

- Location within Bartholomew County, Indiana Location within Indiana Location within the United States
- Location: 2700 McKinley Ave., Columbus, Indiana, US
- Coordinates: 39°12′7″N 85°53′31″W
- Architect: John Carl Warnecke
- Architectural style: Modern
- NRHP reference No.: 01000068

Significant dates
- Added to NRHP: January 3, 2001
- Designated NHL: January 3, 2003

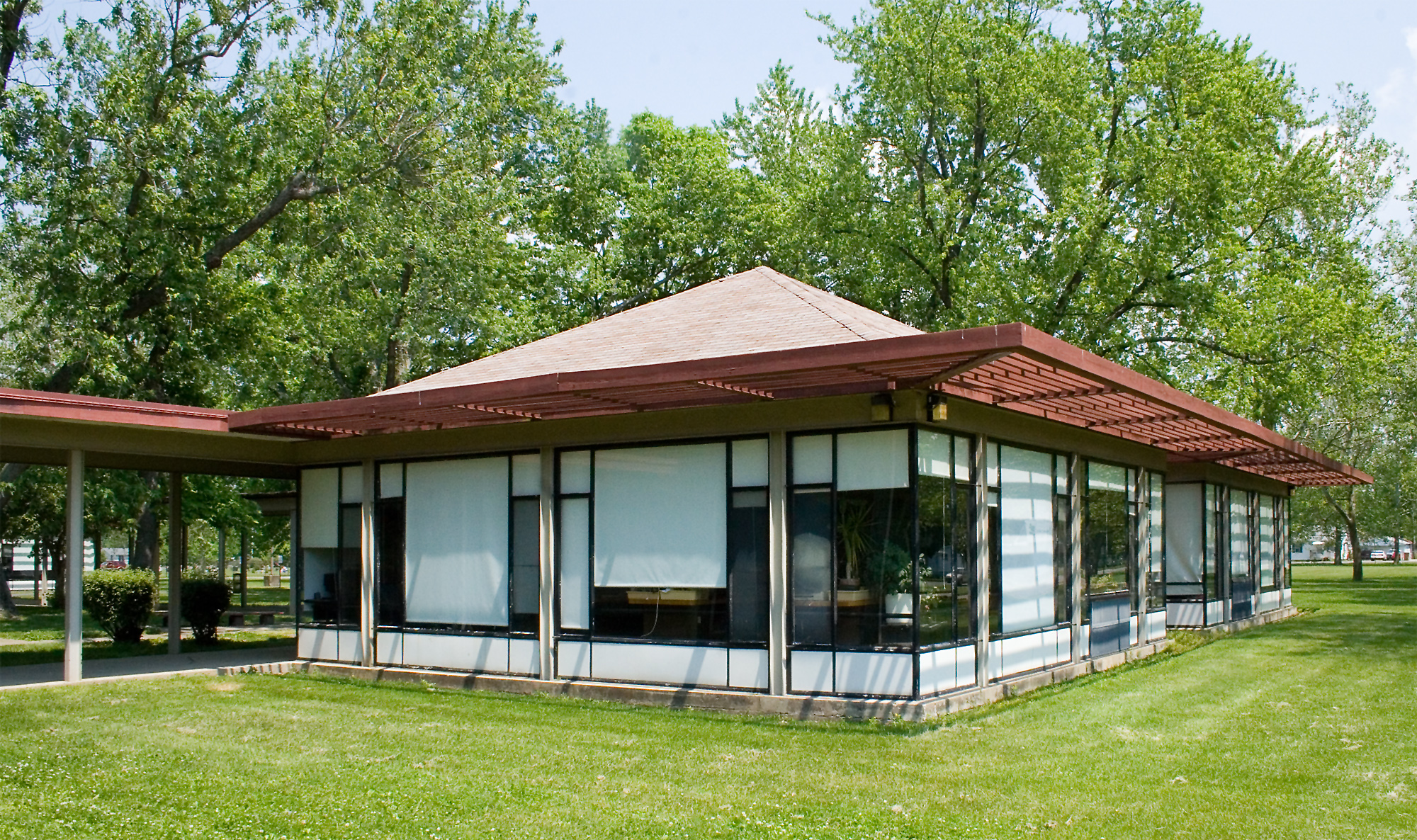
Detail showing detached pod

The Mabel McDowell Adult Education Center (formerly the Mabel McDowell Elementary School) is an adult education center of the Bartholomew Consolidated School Corporation occupying a historic building in Columbus, Indiana. The building, constructed in 1960, is a major early work of architect John Carl Warnecke. It was converted to an adult education center in 1982.

== History ==
In 2001, the building was designated by the National Park Service as a National Historic Landmark because of its architecture. The building's application for landmark status described it as "significant as an early example of modern architecture in Columbus, and as an important example of the contextual work of John Carl Warnecke, a leading architect of the twentieth century." The building is designed as a series of pods, connected by covered and trellised walkways. The major spaces in each pod (classrooms and other common spaces) are covered by individual pyramidal roof sections. The construction is steel framing on concrete slabs, with the walls finished in steel-clad glass and brick.

Warnecke's design for McDowell attempted to combine functionality with open space reminiscent of an Indiana farm landscape. In his concept for McDowell, Warnecke said a "dominant characteristic of southern Indiana is the flat terrain, a horizontal theme accentuated by tall Victorian houses, barns, and silos, with picturesque groves of trees. The school design is based on the creation of similar grouping of masses and spaces in a scheme which focuses the school group into its own controlled environment, yet extends it outward to the community." Warnecke also designed the John F. Kennedy grave at Arlington National Cemetery and the Hawaii State Capitol building.

== See also ==
- List of National Historic Landmarks in Indiana
- National Register of Historic Places listings in Bartholomew County, Indiana
