= Executive Office Building =

Executive Office Building may refer to:

- Eisenhower Executive Office Building (formerly Old Executive Office Building), a U.S. government office building situated just west of the White House in Washington, D.C., occupied by the Executive Office of the President
- New Executive Office Building, a U.S. government office building on the north side of Pennsylvania Avenue, across from the Eisenhower Executive Office Building
- Executive Office Building (St. Louis, Missouri), listed on the NRHP in Missouri
- Executive Office Building, $10-million structure erected at Utulei, American Samoa in 1991
