= John Carl Warnecke =

American architect (1919–2010)

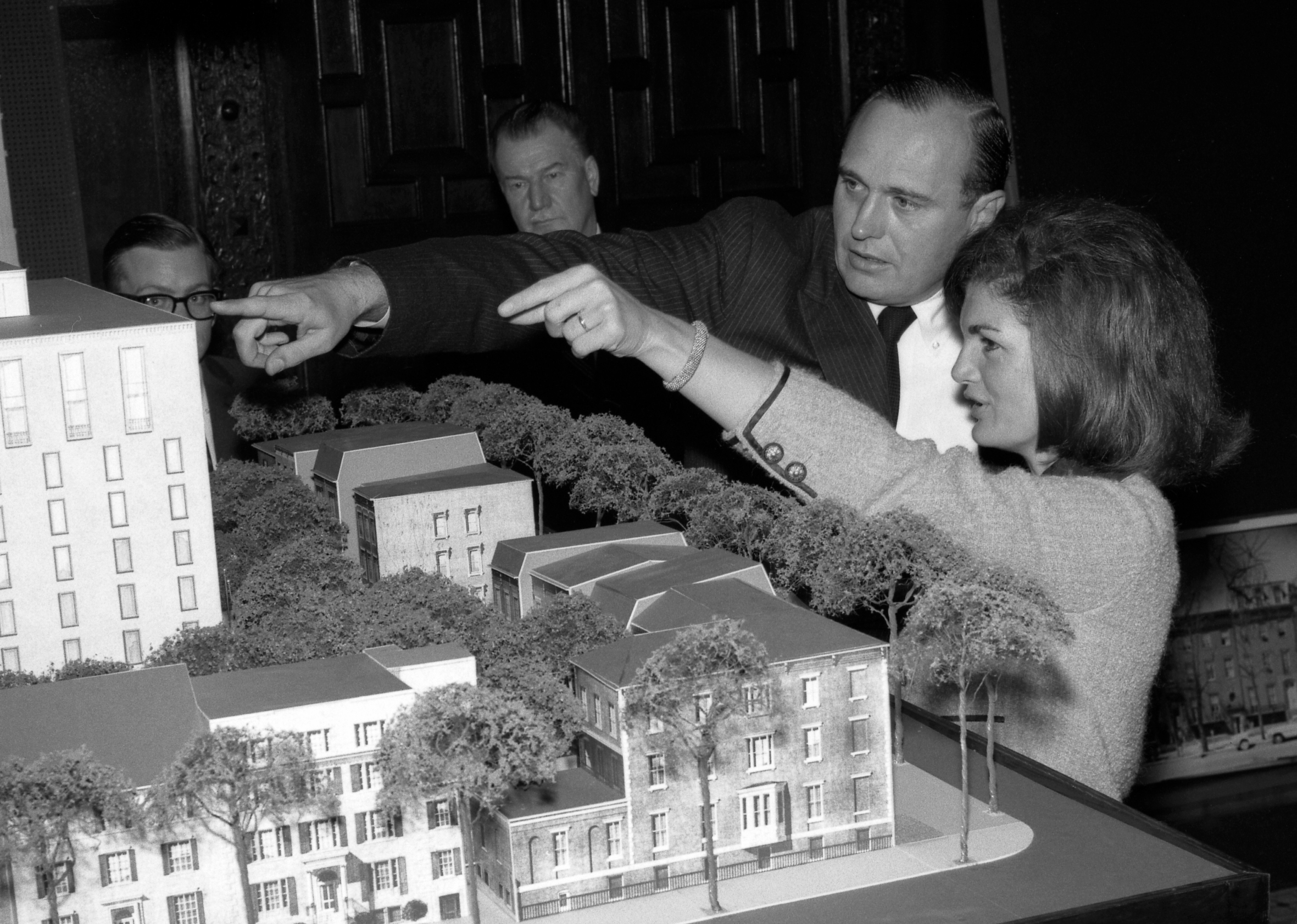
- John Carl Warnecke and First Lady Jacqueline Kennedy discuss plans for Lafayette Square in September 1962.
- Born: February 24, 1919; Oakland, California, U.S.
- Died: April 17, 2010 (aged 91); Healdsburg, California, U.S.
- Occupation: Architect
- Practice: John Carl Warnecke & Associates

John Carl "Jack" Warnecke (February 24, 1919 – April 17, 2010) was an American architect based in who designed numerous monuments and structures in the Modernist, Bauhaus, and other similar styles. He was an early proponent of contextual architecture. Among his more notable buildings and projects are the Hawaii State Capitol building, the John F. Kennedy Eternal Flame memorial gravesite at Arlington National Cemetery, and the master plan for Lafayette Square (which includes his designs for the Howard T. Markey National Courts Building and the New Executive Office Building).

== Early life ==
Warnecke was born on February 24, 1919, in Oakland, California. His father, Carl I. Warnecke, was a prominent architect in Oakland and San Francisco. His mother, Margaret Warnecke, née Esterling, was a descendant of Dutch settlers who came to Sonoma County, California, in the 1870s.

He received his bachelor's degree (cum laude) from Stanford University in 1941. He played American football at Stanford, and was a member of the undefeated 1940 Stanford Indians football team (nicknamed the "Wow Boys") that won the 1941 Rose Bowl. A shoulder injury incurred while playing football prevented him from being drafted or serving in the U.S. military during World War II. While studying at Stanford, Warnecke made the acquaintance of John F. Kennedy, who was auditing courses at the university. Warnecke received his master's degree in architecture from Harvard University in 1942, completing the three-year course in a single year. While attending Harvard, he studied with the highly influential architect Walter Gropius.

Jack Warnecke as a tackle on Stanford's undefeated 1940 football team.

Warnecke married Grace Cushing in 1945, with whom he had three sons and a daughter. His oldest son, John C. Warnecke, Jr., died in 2003. The marriage ended in divorce in 1961. Warnecke married Grace Kennan (daughter of George F. Kennan) in 1969, which also ended in divorce.

== Early architectural career ==
After graduating from Harvard University, Warnecke worked as a building inspector for the public housing authority in Richmond, California. In 1943, he began work as a draftsman for his father's architectural firm (which specialized in the Beaux-Arts architectural style). He was influenced by the work of architects Bernard Maybeck and William Wurster, leading proponents and practitioners of the "Bay Area school" of architecture.

He established a solo practice in 1950, and incorporated as a firm in 1956. At first, he set a goal of applying Modernist architectural principles to major types of building. His work soon reflected a desire to harmonize building designs with the environment in which they were set as well as their cultural and historical setting, an architectural theory known as contextualism. Warnecke won national recognition in 1951 for the Mira Vista Elementary School in East Richmond Heights, California (a small residential community which overlooks the northern part of San Francisco Bay). Other schools in the San Francisco Bay followed, earning him much praise. Warnecke became an internationally recognized architect after submitting a design for a new U.S. embassy in Thailand in 1956, which was never built. He reorganized his firm in 1958 under the name John Carl Warnecke & Associates, the name it would be best known by. He was named an Associate of the National Academy of Design the same year. He won additional notice for buildings at Stanford University (built in the 1960s) and the University of California, Berkeley (built in the 1960s and early 1970s).

Warnecke designed seven of the buildings at the 107 acres (43 ha) Asilomar Conference Grounds located in Pacific Grove, California, adjacent to Asilomar State Beach. The Asilomar Conference Grounds Warnecke Historic District consists of 22 buildings and related landscape features after the State of California acquired the property in 1956. The Warnecke buildings include, Surf and Sand Complex (1959); Corporation Yard (1959); Crocker Dining Hall Additions (1961); Sea Galaxy Complex (1964); Housekeeping (1965); Long View Complex (1966); and View Crescent Complex (1968).

== Association with Kennedys ==
=== Lafayette Square ===
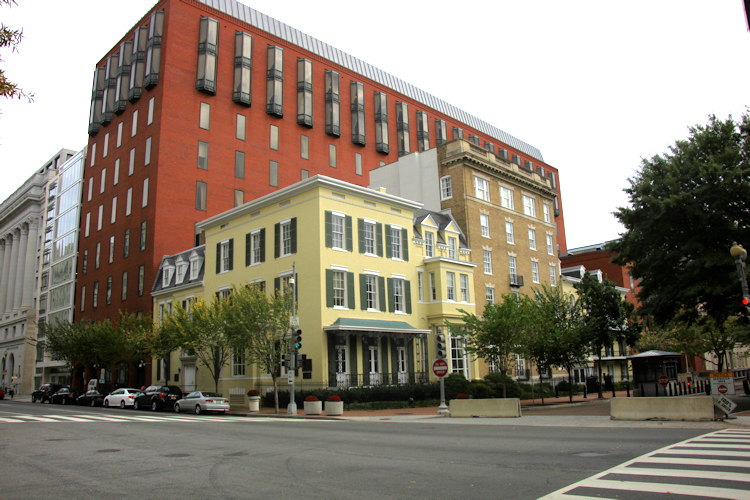
Northeast corner of Lafayette Square. The Howard T. Markey National Courts Building (in red) stands behind the historic Cutts-Madison House (yellow) and former Cosmos Club (tan).

Warnecke's reputation as an architect received a substantial boost when he was asked by the administration of President John F. Kennedy to save the historic buildings surrounding Lafayette Square. The controversy over Lafayette Square can be traced back to 1900, when the United States Congress passed a resolution establishing the U.S. Senate Park Commission. The Park Commission's proposals, which came to be known as the "McMillan Plan", proposed that all the buildings around Lafayette Square be razed and replaced by tall, Neoclassical buildings clad in white marble for use by executive branch agencies. Little action was taken on these proposals over the next 50 years. However, plans were made in the late 1950s to raze all the buildings on the east side of Lafayette Square and replace them with a white modernist office building which would house judicial offices. Opposition to the demolition of the Cutts-Madison House and other buildings on Lafayette Square began forming shortly after the decision to raze the structures was announced. The newly elected Kennedy administration indicated in February 1961 that it was anxious to retain the existing historic homes on Lafayette Square.

In February 1962, First Lady Jacqueline Kennedy lobbied the General Services Administration to stop the demolition and adopt a different design plan. "The wreckers haven't started yet, and until they do it can be saved", she wrote. Jacqueline Kennedy enlisted architect Warnecke, who happened to be in town that weekend, to create a design which would incorporate the new buildings with the old. With this project, Warnecke was one of the first architects to receive a commission from the Kennedy administration. Warnecke conceived the basic design over that weekend, and worked closely with Jacqueline Kennedy over the next few months to formalize the design proposal. The design was presented to the public and the Commission of Fine Arts (which had approval over any plan) in October 1962, and with Jacqueline Kennedy's backing the Commission adopted the revised Warnecke design proposal.

Warnecke's design for the square was based on the architectural theory of contextualism. Warnecke's design build the first modern buildings on Lafayette Square and they were the first buildings in the city to utilize contextualism as a design philosophy. Warnecke's design for the Markey National Courts Building was to create tall, flat structures in red brick which would serve as relatively unobtrusive backgrounds to the lighter-colored residential homes like the Cutts-Madison House. The Cutts-Madison House, Cosmos Club building, and Benjamin Ogle Tayloe House were joined, and a courtyard built between them and the National Courts building.

Warnecke continued to contribute to architectural design in Washington, D.C. He opened an office in the District of Columbia in 1962. He was made a Fellow of the American Institute of Architects the same year.

Warnecke was appointed to an important federal post and received two important commissions from the Kennedy family in 1963. On June 21, 1963, President Kennedy appointed Warnecke to the U.S. Commission of Fine Arts. Warnecke's first important commission from the President was the design for a presidential library. Plans and sites were discussed in May, and on October 19, just 34 days before his assassination, President Kennedy (with Warnecke by his side) chose a site next to the Harvard Graduate School of Business Administration. As Warnecke and Kennedy had only discussed general themes for the design, I. M. Pei was selected by the Kennedy family to be the library's actual architect.

=== Kennedy grave site ===
President Kennedy was assassinated on November 22, 1963, and Warnecke was chosen by Jacqueline Kennedy to design John F. Kennedy's tomb six days later on November 28. Coincidentally, the President and Warnecke had visited the site which was to become Kennedy's tomb in March 1963, and the President had admired the peaceful atmosphere of the place. On November 24, Jacqueline Kennedy told friends that she wanted an eternal flame at the gravesite.

Warnecke visited the grave with Jacqueline Kennedy and Attorney General Robert F. Kennedy on Wednesday, November 27, to discuss themes and plans for the grave. He concluded that the permanent grave must be simple and must incorporate the eternal flame. A few days later, Warnecke agreed that, although it was not required, he would submit the design for the permanent Kennedy grave site to the U.S. Commission of Fine Arts.

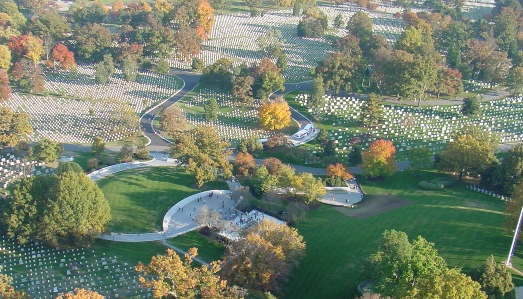
Aerial view of the President John F. Kennedy grave site and Eternal Flame at Arlington National Cemetery in Arlington, Virginia, in November 2005.

The grave design process was placed under tight secrecy. An extensive research project was conducted in which hundreds of famous tombs (such as the Mausoleum of Halicarnassus and Grant's Tomb) as well as all existing presidential burial sites. Warnecke discussed design concepts with more than 40 architects, sculptors, painters, landscape architects, stonemasons, calligraphers, and liturgical experts—including the sculptor Isamu Noguchi, architectural model maker Theodore Conrad, and the U.S. Commission of Fine Arts. Noguchi counseled Warnecke to add a large sculptural cross to the site and to eliminate the eternal flame (which he felt was kitschy). Warnecke consulted with Jacqueline Kennedy about the design of the grave many times over the following year. Hundreds of architectural drawings and models were produced to explore design ideas. On April 6, 1964, Warnecke sent a memorandum to Jacqueline Kennedy in which he outlined his desire to retain the eternal flame as the centerpiece of the burial site and to keep the site's design as simple as possible. In the course of the research and conceptualization effort, Warnecke considered the appropriateness of structures or memorials at the site (such as crosses, shafts, pavilions, etc.), the history of Arlington National Cemetery, the vista, and how to handle ceremonies at the site. By August 1964, Warnecke and his assistants had written a 76-page research report which concluded that the gravesite was not a memorial nor monument, but a grave. "This particular hillside, this flame, this man and this point in history must be synthesized in one statement that has distinctive character of its own. We must avoid adding elements that in later decades might become superficial and detract from the deeds of the man," Warnecke wrote For some time in the spring and summer of 1964, the design process appeared to slow as Warnecke and his associates struggled to design the actual graves. But in the summer of 1964 Sargent Shriver, President Kennedy's brother-in-law, forcefully told Warnecke that "There must be something there when we get there." This spurred the design effort forward. In the late summer and early fall, Warnecke considered massive headstones, a sarcophagus, a sunken tomb, a raised tomb, and sculpture to mark the graves. Very late in the design process, two abstract sculptures were designed but ultimately rejected.

The final design was unveiled publicly at the National Gallery of Art in Washington, D.C., on November 13, 1964. The final design had won the approval of the Kennedy family, the Department of Defense, the U.S. Commission of Fine Arts, and the National Capital Planning Commission. Two overarching design concerns guided the design of the site. First, Warnecke intended the grave itself to reflect the early New England tradition of a simple headstone set flat in the ground surrounded by grass. Second, the site was designed to reflect President Kennedy's Christian faith.

As initially envisioned by Warnecke, the site would be accessed by a circular granite walkway which led to an elliptical marble plaza. The downslope side of the elliptical plaza would be enclosed by a low wall inscribed with quotes from Kennedy's speeches. Marble steps led up from the plaza to a rectangular terrace which enclosed a rectangular plot of grass in which the graves would reside. A retaining wall formed the rear of the burial site. The eternal flame would be placed in the center of the grassy plot in a flat, triangular bronze sculpture intended to resemble a votive candle or brazier. The original design won near-universal praise. The U.S. Department of Defense formally hired Warnecke to design the approaches (although this was a fait accompli).

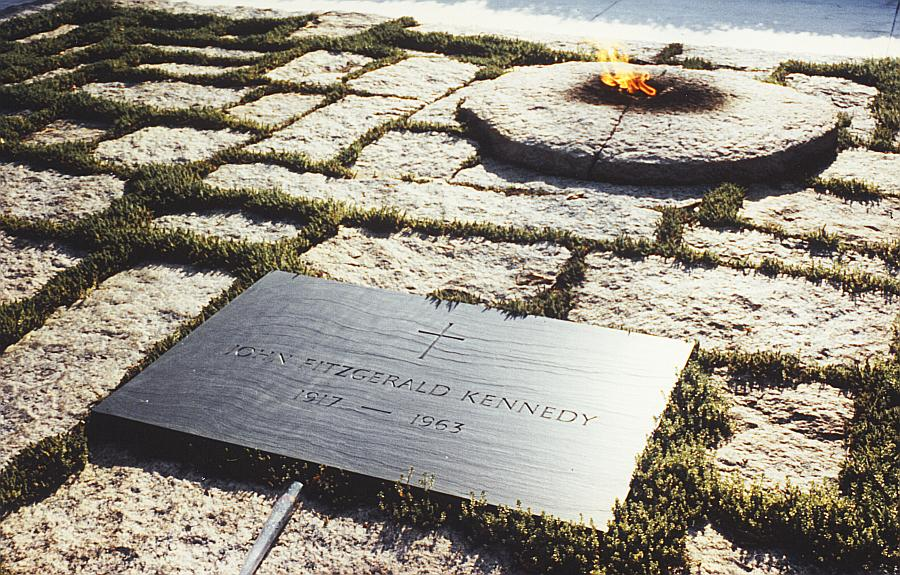
Slate headstone and Eternal Flame marking the grave of John F. Kennedy.

Prior to construction, which formally began in the spring of 1965, several design changes were made to the Kennedy grave site. The retaining wall behind the grave was removed, and the hill landscaped to allow an unobstructed view of Arlington House. Concerned that the grass on the burial plot would wither in Washington's hot summers, in the fall of 1966 the decision was made to replace the grass with rough-hewn reddish-gold granite fieldstone set in a flagstone pattern. The burial plot, originally designed to be raised some height above the surrounding terrace, was lowered so that it was just three to four inches above the fieldstones. The bronze brazier shape for the eternal flame was also replaced. Instead, a 5 feet (1.5 m) wide beige circular fieldstone (found on Cape Cod in 1965) was set nearly flush with the earth and used as a bracket for the flame.

The permanent John F. Kennedy grave site opened with little announcement or fanfare at 7:00 AM on March 15, 1967, in a driving rain. The ceremony, which took 20 minutes, was attended by President Lyndon B. Johnson, Jacqueline Kennedy, and members of the Kennedy family.

According to Warnecke (and others), during the design work on the Kennedy gravesite he became romantically involved with Jacqueline Kennedy. At one point, the couple contemplated marriage. They ended their involvement in December 1966.

Warnecke's term on the U.S. Commission of Fine Arts ended in July 1967, and he was not reappointed after President Johnson expressed his desire to have his own preferred architects on the board.

== Later career, retirement, and death ==
Warnecke opened an office in New York City in 1967, hiring architects Eugene Kohn in 1967 and Sheldon Fox in 1972,. By 1977, his company, John Carl Warnecke & Associates, was the largest architectural firm in the United States. In 1976, Kohn left the firm after Warnecke refused him partnership, taking vice-president and designer William Pedersen, manager Sheldon Fox, and a large number of clients with him and founding Kohn Pedersen Fox (KPF). Several Warnecke associates subsequently joined KPF, and when Warnecke's company subsequently languished, he began reducing his active involvement in his architectural practice. Warnecke purposely downsized his firm as he approached retirement, not wishing for his firm to continue after his death.

Warnecke retired in the 1980s and began growing grapes at a vineyard in California's Alexander Valley. He reportedly spent some time writing about architecture. He devoted efforts to establishing the Warnecke Institute of Design, Art and Architecture, a think tank which looked at the effect worldwide trends (such as global warming and resource scarcity) will have on architecture. Warnecke worked on his memoirs, which he completed shortly before he died.

Warnecke died of pancreatic cancer at the age of 91 at his home in Healdsburg, California, on April 17, 2010. He was survived by his second wife, his daughter, and his two sons.

== Notable buildings ==
Warnecke and his firm worked on and designed hundreds of buildings and projects. Among those on which Warnecke himself was sole or lead architect and which have drawn the notice of experts are the following:

List of Warnecke's work
Image	Date(s)	Name	Location	Notes
	1951	Mira Vista Elementary School	East Richmond Heights, California	
	1960	Mabel McDowell Adult Education Center	Columbus, Indiana	
	1960	Post office and bookstore, Stanford University	Stanford, California	
	1963	College Heights campus, College of San Mateo	San Mateo, California	
	1966	J. Henry Meyer Memorial Library, Stanford University	Stanford, California	
	1967	John F. Kennedy Eternal Flame on gravesite, Arlington National Cemetery	Arlington, Virginia	
	1967	Howard T. Markey National Courts Building	Lafayette Square, Washington, D.C.	
	1969	Nathan Cummings Art Building, Stanford University	Stanford, California	low-slung, reinforced concrete building demolished 2015
	1969	Hawaii State Capitol	Honolulu, Hawaii	
	1969	New Executive Office Building	Lafayette Square, Washington, D.C.	
	1969	Joseph Mark Lauinger Library, Georgetown University	Washington, D.C.	
	1969–1974	Hennepin County Government Center	Minneapolis, Minnesota	
	1973	Nimitz Library, United States Naval Academy	Annapolis, Maryland	co-designed with George M. Ewing Company, the master plan and several buildings
	1973	Michelson Hall, United States Naval Academy	Annapolis, Maryland	co-designed with George M. Ewing Company, the master plan and several buildings
	1973	Chauvenet Hall, United States Naval Academy	Annapolis, Maryland	co-designed with George M. Ewing Company, the master plan and several buildings
	1974	AT&T Long Lines Building	New York City, New York	
	1977	South Terminal (now Terminal B), Logan International Airport	Boston, Massachusetts	
	1978	Ventura County Courthouse, Ventura County Government Center Complex, 800 S. Victoria Avenue	Ventura, California	co-designed by Warnecke and Associates and Daniel L. Dworsky and Associates
	1982	Hart Senate Office Building	Washington, D.C.	
	1983	Thomas & Mack Center, University of Nevada, Las Vegas	Las Vegas, Nevada	

== Awards and honors ==
Warnecke won the National Institute of Arts and Letters Prize in Architecture in 1957. He received more than 13 honors and awards from the American Institute of Architects (AIA) by 1964. He also received the Arnold W. Brunner Memorial Prize from the AIA in 1958, as well as the Urban Land Institute Award for Excellence in Architecture. He was a Senior Fellow of the Design Futures Council.

== Bibliography ==
- "AIA Journal Laments Lafayette Square's End." Washington Post. January 29, 1961.
- Anthony, Carl Sferrazza. As We Remember Her: Jacqueline Kennedy Onassis in the Words of Her Family and Friends. Reprint ed. New York: HarperCollins, 2003.
- Anthony, Kathryn H. Designing for Diversity: Gender, Race, and Ethnicity in the Architectural Profession. Urbana, Ill.: University of Illinois Press, 2001.
- "Architectural Concern Selects Vice President." The New York Times. July 21, 1967.
- "Artists At Odds On Kennedy Job." The New York Times. October 7, 1964.
- Bednar, Michael J. L'Enfant's Legacy: Public Open Spaces in Washington, D.C. Baltimore, Md.: Johns Hopkins University Press, 2006.
- Benét, James. A Guide to San Francisco and the Bay Region. New York, Random House, 1966.
- Bradford, Sarah. America's Queen: The Life of Jacqueline Kennedy Onassis. London: Viking, 2000.
- Brown, Emma. "John Carl Warnecke Dies at 91, Designed Kennedy Gravesite." Washington Post. April 23, 2010.
- Bugliosi, Vincent. Four Days in November: The Assassination of President John F. Kennedy. New York: W.W. Norton & Co., 2007.
- Burden, Ernest E. Elements of Architectural Design: A Photographic Sourcebook. New York: Wiley, 2000.
- Chiang, Harriet. "John Warnecke Jr.—Early Manager for Grateful Dead." San Francisco Chronicle. July 14, 2003.
- Clopton, Willard. "Mrs. Kennedy to Discuss Tomb." Washington Post. November 30, 1963.
- "Congress Gets $1.77 Million Request For Permanent JFK Resting Place." Washington Post. February 9, 1965.
- Cramer, James P. and Yankopolus, Jennifer Evans. Almanac of Architecture & Design, 2006. Atlanta, GA: Greenway Group, 2006.
- Cramer, James P. and Yankopolus, Jennifer Evans. Almanac of Architecture & Design, 2005. Atlanta, Ga.: Greenway Group, 2005.
- Current Biography Yearbook. New York: H.W. Wilson, 1969.
- "Fine Arts Commission." Washington Post. June 21, 1963.
- Franklin, Ben A. "Kennedy Chose Site at Harvard For Presidential Library Oct. 19." The New York Times. November 30, 1963.
- Goggans, Jan. The Pacific Region. Westport, Conn.: Greenwood Press, 2004.
- Goldberger, Paul. "New Kennedy Library Plan Released." The New York Times. February 11, 1975.
- Grimes, William. "John Carl Warnecke, Architect to Kennedy, Dies at 91." The New York Times. April 22, 2010.
- "Group Formed to Save Lafayette Sq. Buildings." Washington Post. May 4, 1960.
- Hamblin, Dora Jane. "Mrs. Kennedy's Decisions Shaped All the Solemn Pageantry." Life. December 6, 1963.
- Helfand, Harvey Zane. University of California, Berkeley: An Architectural Tour and Photographs. New York: Princeton Architectural Press, 2002.
- Heymann, C. David. Bobby and Jackie: A Love Story. New York: Simon and Schuster, 2009.
- Hunter, Marjorie. "Old Homes Saved By Mrs. Kennedy." The New York Times. September 27, 1962.
- Huxtable, Ada Louise. "Design Dilemma: The Kennedy Grave." The New York Times. November 29, 1964.
- Huxtable, Ada. "Pei Will Design Kennedy Library." The New York Times. December 13, 1964.
- Huxtable, Ada Louise. "Warnecke's Capital Work." The New York Times. November 30, 1963.
- Jencks, Charles. New Paradigm In Architecture. 7th ed. New Haven, Conn.: Yale University Press, 2002.
- "John Warnecke, Architect, Weds Mrs. McClatchy." The New York Times. September 3, 1969.
- Joncas, Richard; Neuman, David J.; and Turner, Paul Venable. Stanford University. New York: Princeton Architectural Press, 2006.
- "Kennedy Appoints 5 to Fine Arts Panel." The New York Times. June 21, 1963.
- "Kennedy Tomb Design to Be Revealed in Nov." Washington Post. October 10, 1964.
- Kinnard, Lawrence. History of the Greater San Francisco Bay Region. Vol. 3. New York: Lewis Historical Pub. Co., 1966.
- Klein, Edward. Ted Kennedy: The Dream That Never Died. New York: Crown Publishers, 2009.
- "Lafayette, He Is Here." Time. December 13, 1963.
- "Lafayette Sq. Razing Plan Termed Folly." Washington Post. April 12, 1960.
- Levy, Claudia. "Kennedy's Body Moved to Final Grave." Washington Post. March 16, 1967.
- Lindsay, John J. "Court Gets New Home All to Itself." Washington Post. February 25, 1960.
- Loeffler, Jane C. The Architecture of Diplomacy: Building America's Embassies. New York: Princeton Architectural Press, 1998.
- Luria, Sarah. Capital Speculations: Writing and Building Washington. Durham, N.H.: University of New Hampshire Press, 2006.
- "Mabel McDowell Elementary School." National Historic Landmark Nomination. United States Department of the Interior, National Park Service. 2001. Accessed 2010-04-23.
- Marton, Kati. Hidden Power: Presidential Marriages That Shaped Our Recent History. New York: Random House, 2001.
- Matthews, Christopher J. Kennedy & Nixon: The Rivalry that Shaped Postwar America. New York: Simon and Schuster, 1997.
- McLellan, Dennis. "John Carl Warnecke Dies at 91; Designer of JFK Grave Site." Los Angeles Times. April 24, 2010.
- Men and Women of Hawaii. Honolulu: Honolulu Business Consultants, 1972.
- Moeller, Gerard Martin and Weeks, Christopher. AIA Guide to the Architecture of Washington, D.C. Baltimore: Johns Hopkins University Press, 2006.
- "Monuments: A Tomb for J.F.K." Time. November 20, 1964.
- Moritz, Charles. Current Biography Yearbook, 1968. New York: H.W. Wilson Company, 1968.
- "Mrs. Kennedy Chooses an Architect to Design Husband's Tomb." The New York Times. November 30, 1963.
- Peterson, Jon A. The Birth of City Planning in the United States, 1840-1917. Baltimore: Johns Hopkins University Press, 2003.
- Preston, Stuart. "Work by Newly Elected Members of Academy and Institute on View." The New York Times. May 23, 1957.
- Raymond, Jack. "Arlington Assigns Plot of Three Acres To Kennedy Family." The New York Times. December 6, 1963.
- Richard, Paul. "President Adds 2 Members, Renames Chairman to Fine Arts Commission." Washington Post. July 29, 1967.
- Robertson, Nan. "First Stones Placed At Permanent Site Of Kennedy Grave." The New York Times. April 12, 1966.
- Robertson, Nan. "The Kennedy Tomb: Simple Design Outlined." The New York Times. November 17, 1964.
- Robertson, Nan. "Thousands Expected to Pay Respects at Grave." The New York Times. November 22, 1964.
- Robertson, Nan. "Tomb for Kennedy Is of Simple Design." The New York Times. November 14, 1964.
- Roth, Leland M. American Architecture: A History. Boulder, Colo.: Icon Editions, 2001.
- Sakamoto, Dean and Britton, Karla. Hawaiian Modern: The Architecture of Vladimir Ossipoff. Honolulu: Honolulu Academy of Arts, 2007.
- Saxon, Wolfgang. "Sheldon Fox, Architect and Manager, Dies at 76." The New York Times. December 20, 2006.
- Seale, William. The President's House: A History. 2d ed. Baltimore: Johns Hopkins University Press, 2008.
- Semple, Jr., Robert B. "Johnson at Grave With the Kennedys." The New York Times. March 16, 1967.
- "Senator Morse Joins Battle to Save Historic Sites on Lafayette Square." Washington Post. March 24, 1960.
- Serraino, Pierluigi. NorCalMod: Icons of Northern California Modernism. San Francisco: Chronicle Books, 2006.
- Shearer, Lloyd. "Will She Marry Again?" Ottawa Citizen. February 10, 1967.
- Smith, Chris. "John 'Jack' Warnecke, Famed Architect, Dies at Sonoma County Ranch." The Press Democrat. April 20, 2010.
- Stephens, Suzanne. "John Carl Warnecke, Known for Contextualism and Charisma, Dies." Architectural Record. April 23, 2010.
- Taraborrelli, J. Randy. Jackie, Ethel, Joan: Women of Camelot. New York: Warner Books, 2000.
- Thanawala, Sudhin. "John Warnecke, Kennedy Grave Site Architect, Dies." Associated Press. April 23, 2010.
- "3 Changes Made In Original Design Of Kennedy Grave." The New York Times. March 17, 1967.
- "3 Historic Buildings Befriended." Washington Post. March 2, 1960.
- "2 Federal Courts To Be Housed on Lafayette Square." Washington Post. September 17, 1960.
- Von Eckardt, Wolf. "Architect Warnecke: 20th Century USA." Washington Post. December 22, 1963.
- Von Eckardt, Wolf. "A Critical Look at the Kennedy Grave." Washington Post. March 26, 1967.
- Von Eckardt, Wolf. "JFK Grave Design Combines Past, Present." Washington Post. November 22, 1964.
- Von Eckardt, Wolf. "Kennedy Grave's Design Lauded By Architects and Art Experts." Washington Post. November 18, 1964.
- Von Eckardt, Wolf. "Kennedy Monument Classic in Simplicity." Washington Post. November 17, 1964.
- "Washington DC: A Guide to the Historic Neighborhoods and Monuments of Our Nation's Capital." National Park Service. United States Department of the Interior. No date. Accessed 2008-04-18.
- White, Jean. "Administration Anxious To Save Lafayette Park." Washington Post. February 17, 1961.
- White, Jean. "Garden Atmosphere of Lafayette Sq. Can Be Preserved, Says Architect." Washington Post. March 3, 1961.
- White, Norval; Willensky, Elliott; and Leadon, Fran. AIA Guide to New York City. New York: Oxford University Press, 2010.
- Who's Who in California. San Clemente, Calif.: Who's Who Historical Society, 1979.
- Wilson, Jr., Walter K. Engineer Memoirs: Lieutenant General Walter K. Wilson, Jr.. Publication Number: EP 870-1-8. Washington, D.C.: U.S. Army Corps of Engineers/U.S. Government Printing Office, May 1984.
