= Five cents John Kennedy =

1964 United States postage stamp

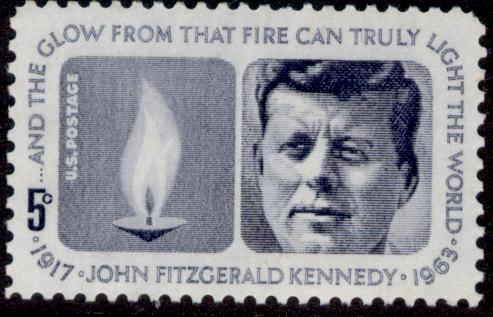
- Country of production: United States
- Date of production: January–April 1964
- Designer: Raymond Loewy (Loewy/Snaith)
- Dimensions: 40 mm × 25 mm (1.57 in × 0.98 in)
- Perforation: 11 x 10 1/2
- Commemorates: John F. Kennedy
- Depicts: John F. Kennedy and the Eternal Flame at Arlington National Cemetery
- Face value: 5 cents

The five cents John Kennedy is the first United States postage stamp to pay tribute to United States President John Fitzgerald Kennedy. It was issued May 29, 1964 for his 47th birthday, with a first day of issue cancellation in his hometown of Boston, Massachusetts.

The overall shape of the stamp is a horizontal rectangle, of a size standard for the time. The design consists of two side-by-side squares, the left one with a depiction of the John F. Kennedy Eternal Flame, the right one with a portrait of Kennedy adapted from a photograph taken in 1958 by Bill Murphy for The Los Angeles Times. Textual inscriptions form a frame around the central design, and include a quotation from Kennedy's 1961 inaugural address "... And the glow from that fire can truly light the world.", along with Kennedy's full name and the years of his birth and death. The required "U.S. POSTAGE" inscription is positioned inconspicuously in small letters vertically next to the Eternal Flame, while the denomination is in the frame text. The stamp is in a single blue-gray color.

Soon after the assassination of President Kennedy in Dallas, Texas on November 22, 1963, the United States Post Office Department decided to issue a postage stamp to be issued on his next birthday. This was a challenging deadline, requiring the stamp to be designed, approved by the President's widow, Jacqueline Kennedy, and printed in large quantities in just a few months (it was estimated that two million first day covers would need to be available).

The first proposals of the Bureau of Engraving and Printing were turned down in December 1963 and in early January 1964. The decision was then made to call in the Loewy/Snaith design firm. Raymond Loewy accepted the stamp design project more for the firm's reputation than for money; the firm earned only $500 for this project, a very small and symbolic amount considering the amount of labor involved.

Over the next three months, Loewy's designers worked on the project. To maintain secrecy, Loewy locked the papers and projects in his safe every day, putting his thumb's fingerprint on them.

Finally, Mrs. Kennedy was consulted, choosing both the design proposal and its color, a blue-gray similar to that used in the interior of Air Force One.

William Manchester, in his book The Death of a President (published by Michael Joseph in 1967) on page 246 gives another version of how the stamp was produced:

Immediately after the first announcements of the assassination, many people "...took refuge in habit. Two designers at the Bureau of Engraving and Printing, feeling utterly lost, neatly laid out their tools and doodled away at a John F Kennedy commemorative stamp. (Though meant to be tentative, those Friday sketches were flawless; four days later they were in the hands of the Postmaster General, and the stamp issued the following spring)."

== See also ==
- Kennedy Stamp, Issue of 1967
- Presidents of the United States on U.S. postage stamps
- Cultural depictions of John F. Kennedy
- List of memorials to John F. Kennedy
