= Leesylvania (plantation) =

Plantation and home in Virginia, US

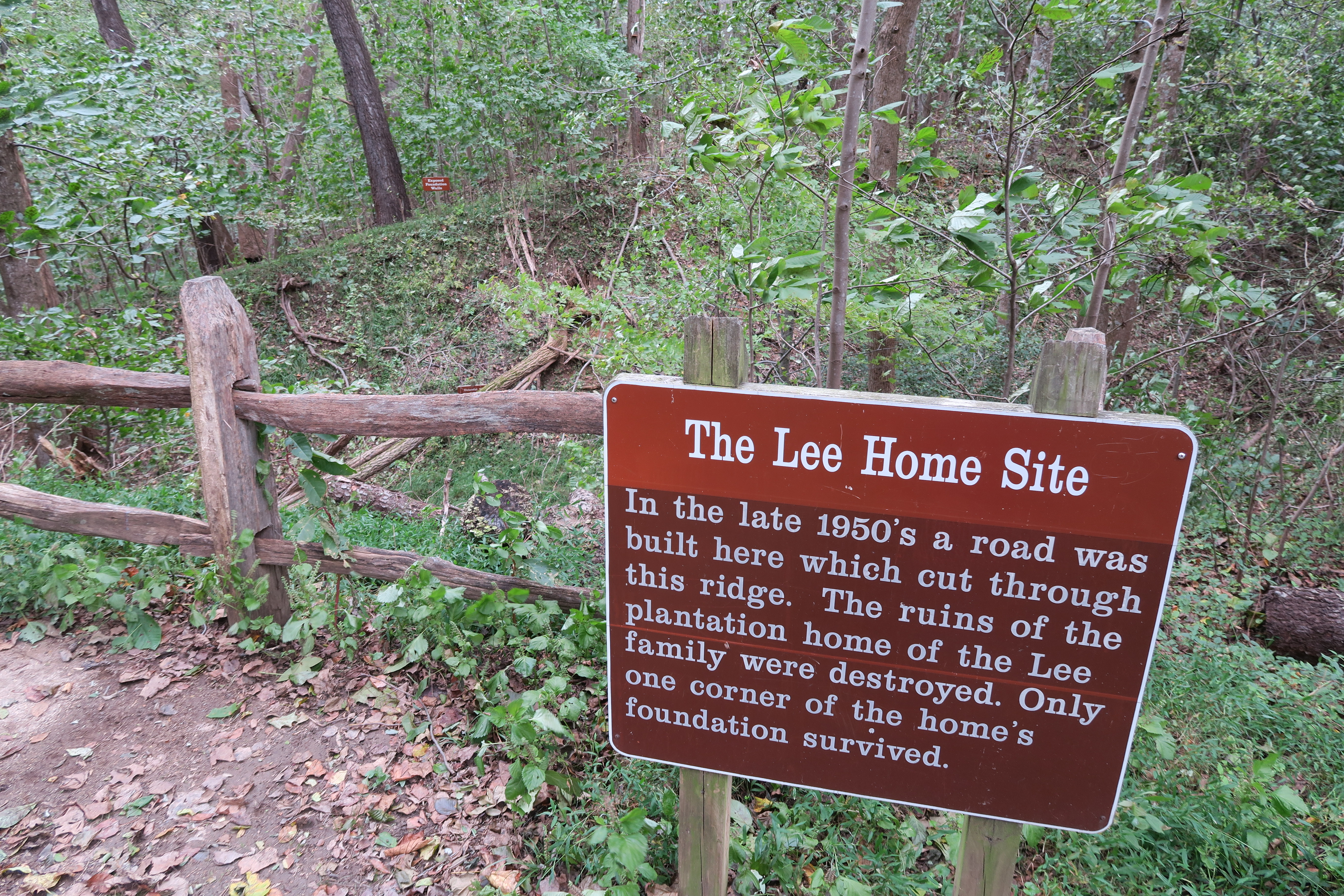
Lee home site along Leesylvania State Park trail

Leesylvania was a plantation and historic home in Prince William County, Virginia, now part of Leesylvania State Park. During the 18th century, it was the home of Henry Lee II, his family and numerous slaves, and known for its productive land and especially the quality of its tobacco. Lee's sons Henry "Light-Horse Harry" Lee, Richard Bland Lee and Charles Lee, held prominent positions in Virginia during the American Revolutionary War and early federal government.

Today, only a small portion of the foundation of the house remains, due to road construction in the 1950s. Lee and his wife are buried on the property (the family cemetery accessible by trail), but their headstones were moved to the Union Cemetery in Leesburg in 1969. The Leesylvania Archeological Site was listed on the National Register of Historic Places in 1984.

== History ==
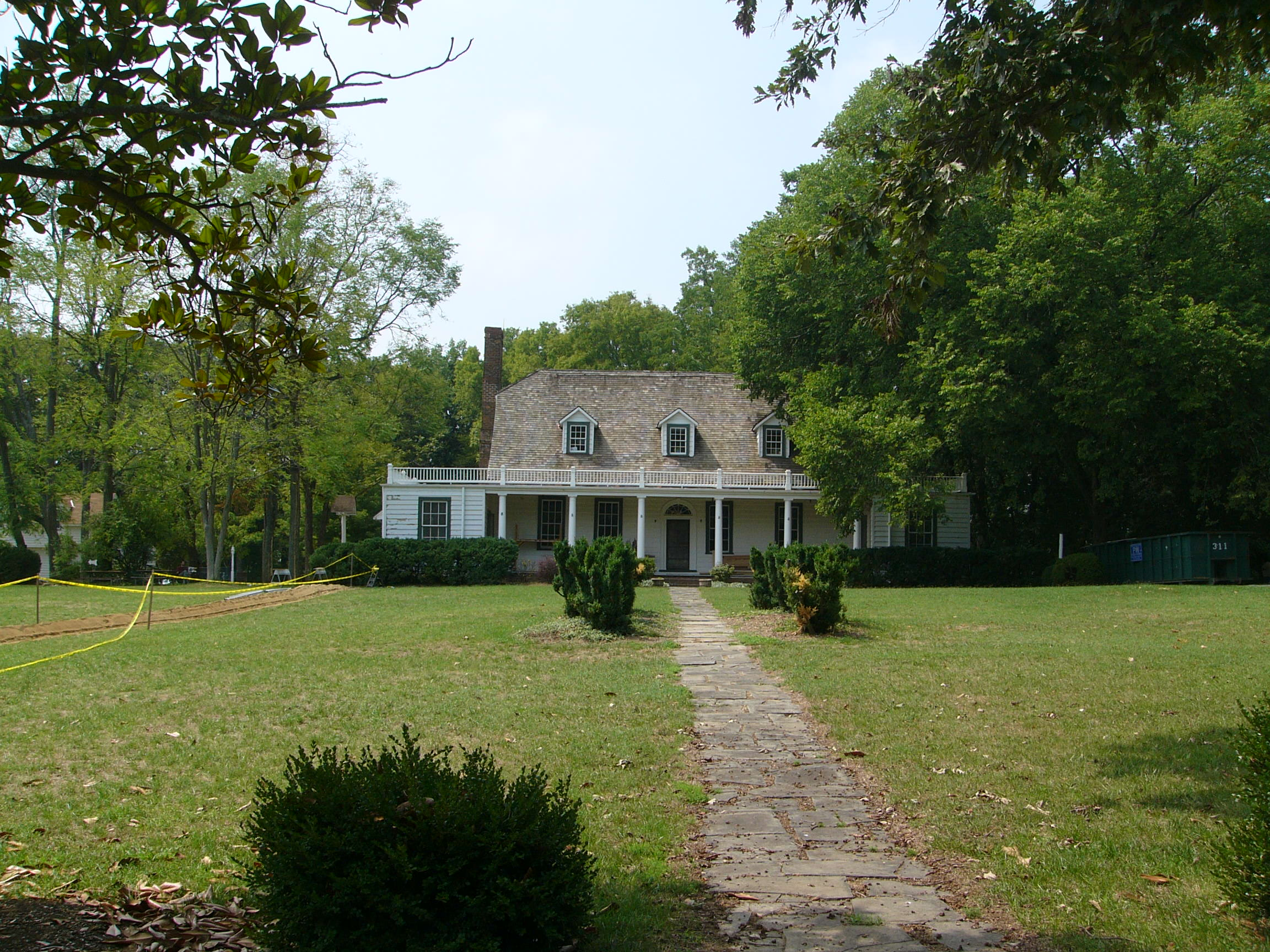
There are no records of Leesylvania's construction but it likely looked similar to nearby Rippon Lodge (pictured), built around the same time.

The original tract of land comprised four headright grants of 50 acres each, given for "each person transported into the 'Kingdom of Virginia'". In 1658, Henry Corbin acquired the land and deeded it to his daughter, Laetitia, to become hers upon coming of age or when she was married. Selected in 1679 as a site for an English fort to defend against Indians, the earliest grave dates from 1690.

When Richard "the Scholar" Lee II married Laetitia Corbin in 1675 he took ownership of the land along the Potomac River known as Freestone Point, which passed down through his son, Henry Lee I, to his grandson, Henry Lee II, who inherited the 2,000 acres that would become Leesylvania (Lee's Woods) in 1747. Around 1750 he chose the site on a high ridge overlooking the Potomac River, which is believed to have been similar to nearby Rippon Lodge, which was built around the same time.

Typical for plantations of the time, Leesylvania relied on slave labor. At the time of Lee's death in 1787, he owned 55 slaves who worked the property. The plantation's main crops were tobacco, corn, wheat, and dairy products. There was also a commercial fishing operation. In 1767, an enslaved man from Leesylvania named Harry, along with enslaved iron worker named Gawin from the nearby Neabsco Iron Works, attempted to poison Lucy Grymes.

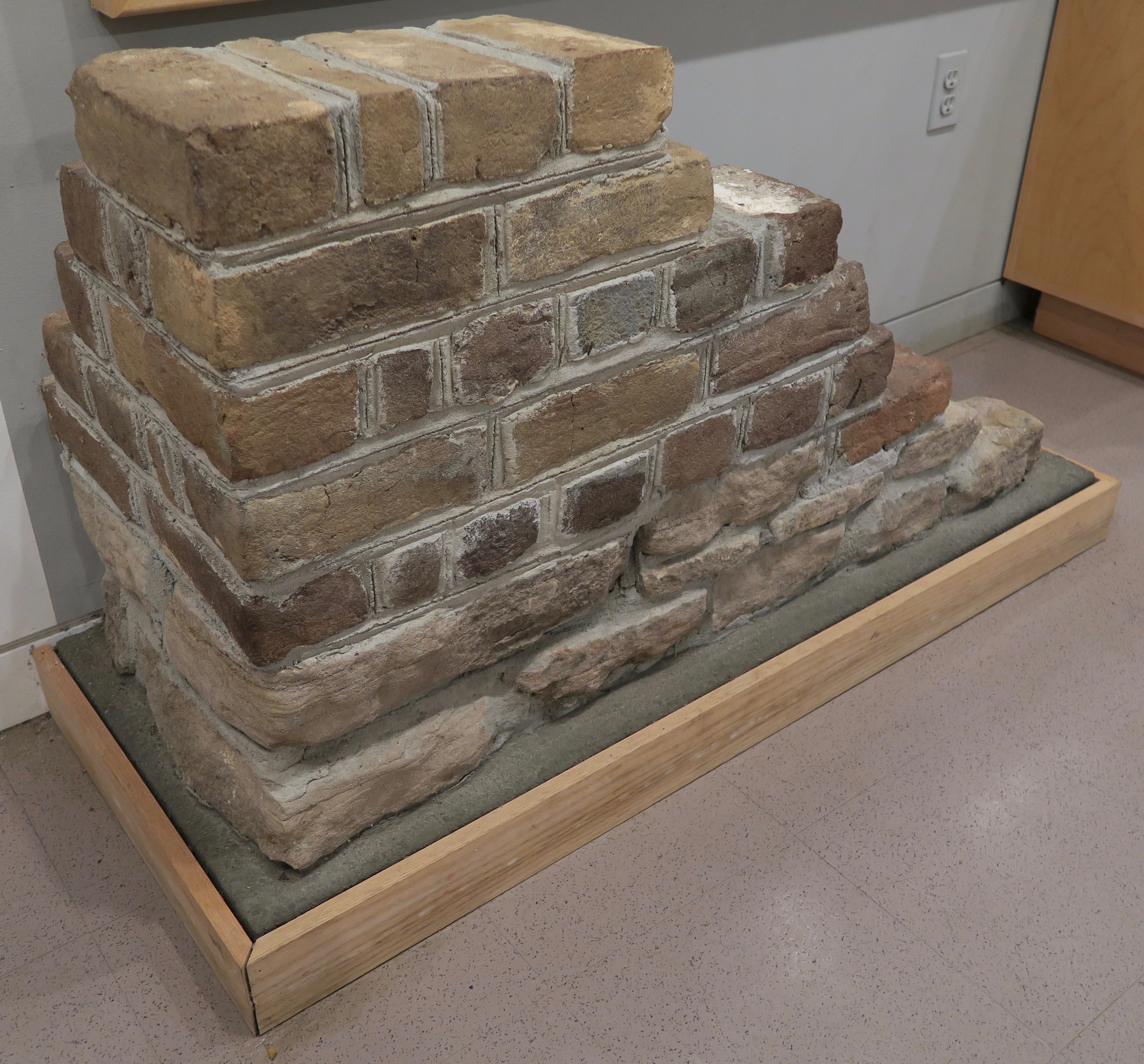
Reconstructed corner of the Leesylvania manor house

When Lee died in 1787, Leesylvania was left to his wife, Lucy, and then to their second son, Charles, upon her death in 1792. He conspicuously excluded his eldest son, "Light-Horse Harry", from inheriting most of his other properties, and any other belongings, including slaves, likely due to his history of poor financial decisions. The house had burnt down in 1790, and Charles mortgaged 2,040 acres to William Lee for a brief time. It was sold by Lee II's grandson, Alfred, in 1825 to Captain Henry Fairfax. The chimney of the Fairfax home can still be seen in the park.

What remained of the plantation house was destroyed in the 1950s when a road was constructed for the Freestone Point Resort. A small portion of the foundation is visible in its original location within Leesylvania State Park. A corner of the house is reconstructed in the Visitors Center, using sandstone from the property and bricks salvaged from the original site.

=== Notable residents ===
- Henry Lee II - Built Leesylvania. Served in multiple positions in Prince William County and represented the county in the House of Burgesses. Participated in the Virginia Conventions of 1774, 1775, and 1776.
- Henry "Light-Horse Harry" Lee III - Born at Leesylvania (1756), the first child of Henry Lee II and Lucy Grymes. Notable cavalry commander in the American Revolution, Governor of Virginia, and Virginia Representative to the United States Congress. Father of Robert E. Lee.
- Charles Lee - Born at Leesylvania (1758), the second child of Henry Lee II. Third United States Attorney General. Represented William Marbury and other appointees of John Adams in Marbury v. Madison.
- Richard Bland Lee - Born at Leesylvania (1761), the third child of Henry Lee II. First member of the United States House of Representatives for Northern Virginia and part of the Compromise of 1790. Built Sully Plantation.
- Edmund Jennings Lee I - Born at Leesylvania (1772), the sixth child of Henry Lee II. Prominent politician in Alexandria, Virginia.

== Current site ==
The ruins of Leesylvania are within current-day Leesylvania State Park and are accessible via the Lee's Woods Trail.

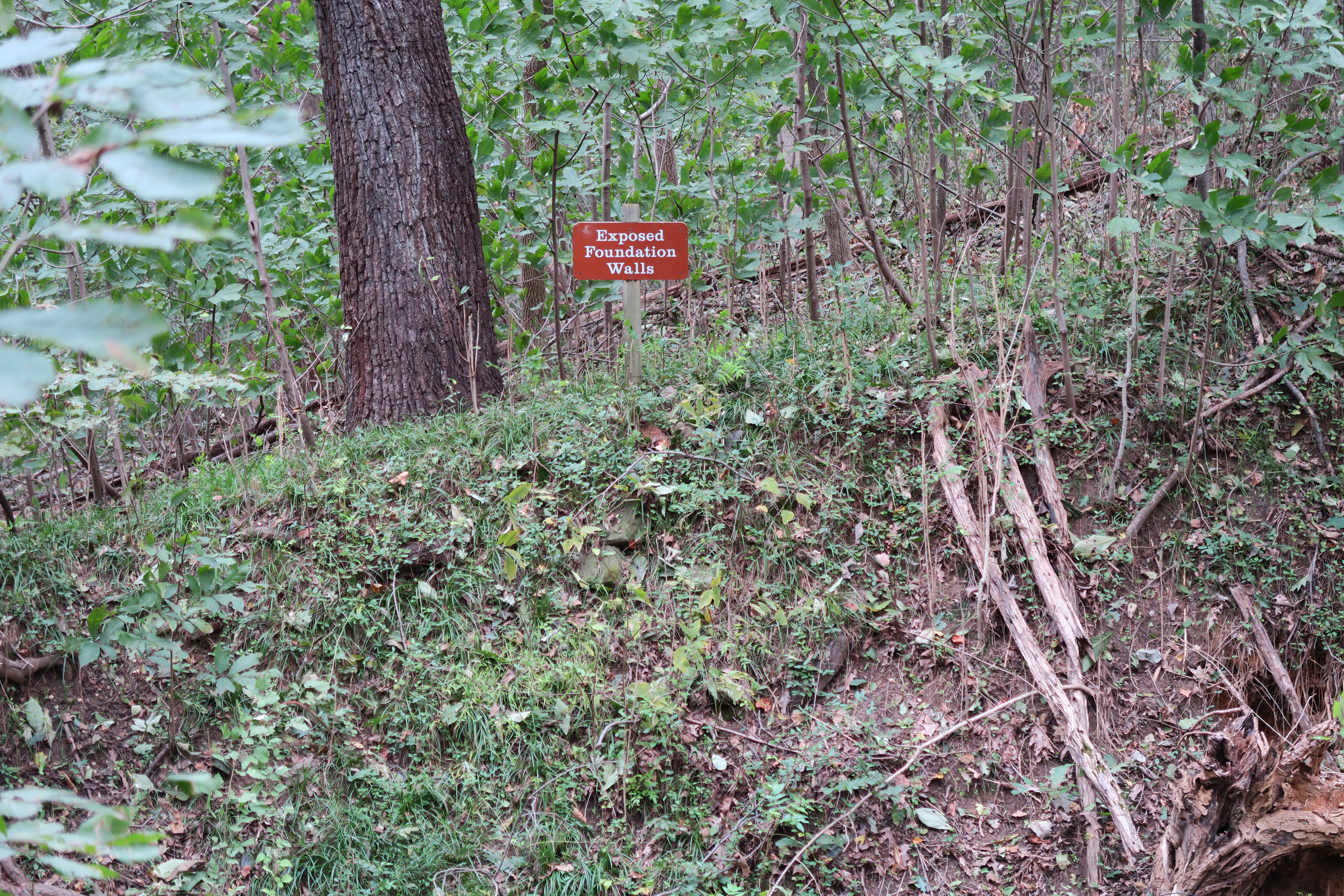
Close-up of exposed Leesylvania foundation

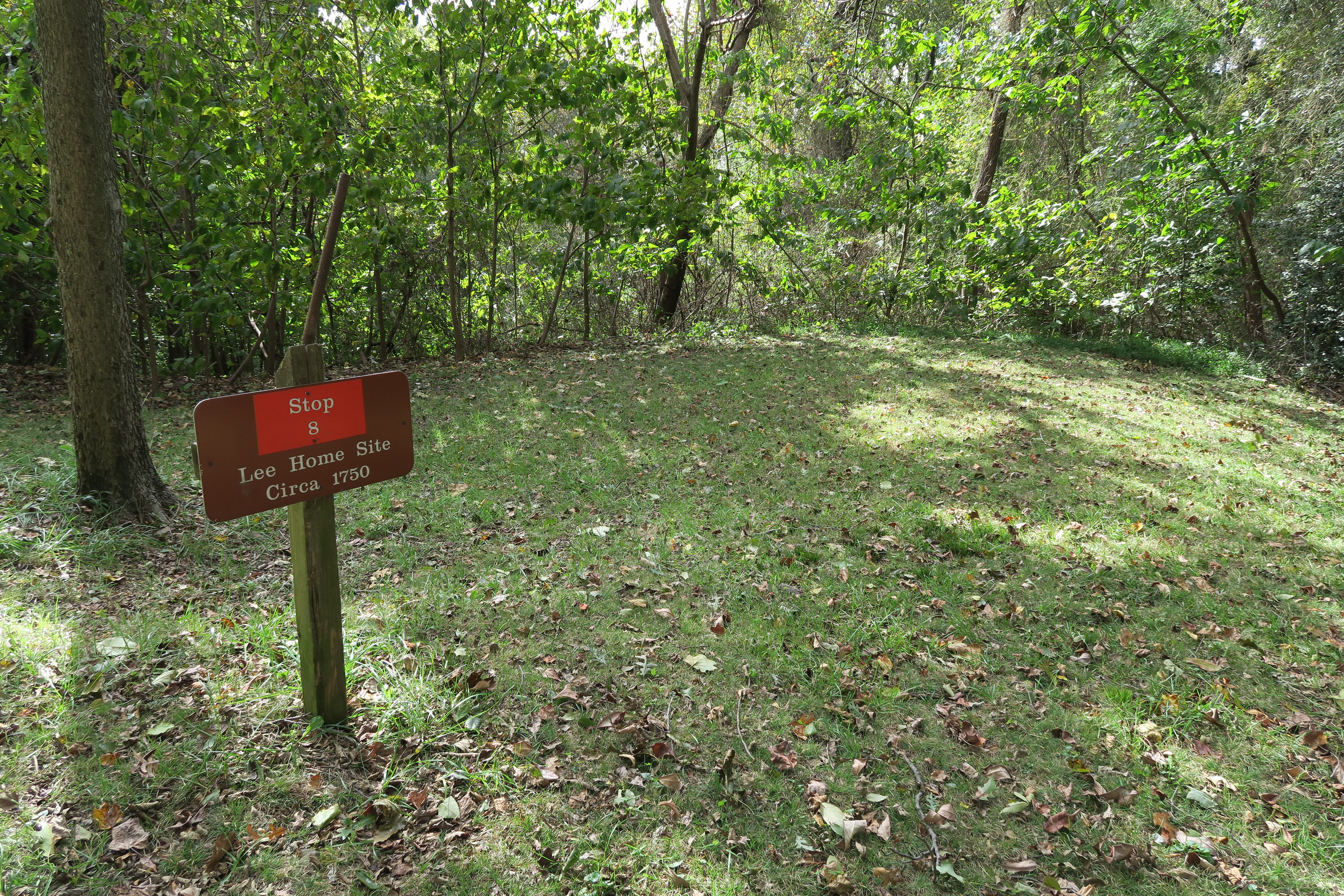
Lee home site

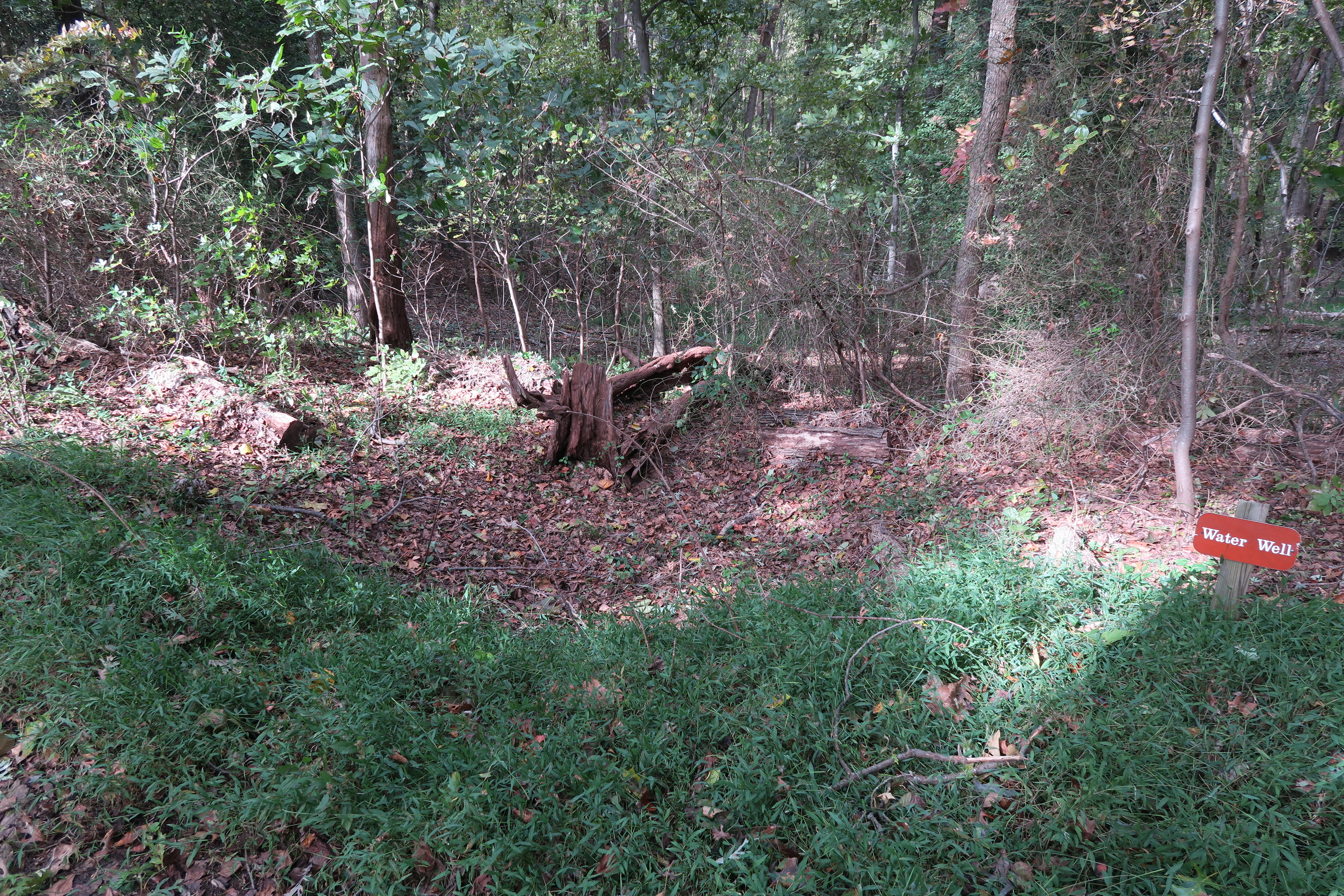
Water well site
