= Richard Bland Lee =

American politician (1761–1827)

Richard Bland Lee I
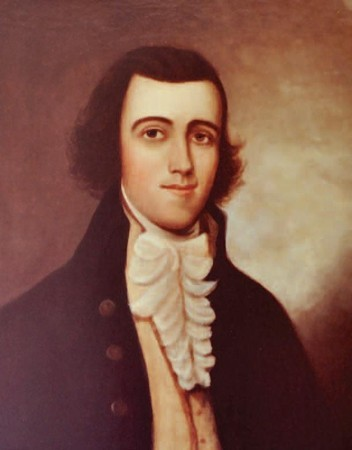

Member of the U.S. House of Representatives from Virginia
- In office March 4, 1789 – March 3, 1795
- Preceded by: District established
- Succeeded by: Richard Brent
- Constituency: 4th district (1789-1793); 17th district (1793-1795)

Member of the Virginia House of Delegates
- In office 1799 Serving with Thomas Swann
- Preceded by: Roger West
- Succeeded by: Nicholas Fitzhugh
- Constituency: Fairfax County
- In office November 8, 1796 - December 3, 1797 Serving with William Ellzey, Jr.
- Preceded by: Stacey Taylor
- Succeeded by: Samuel Clapham
- Constituency: Loudoun County
- In office June 23, 1788 - October 18, 1789 Serving with Levin Powell
- Preceded by: Josiah Clapham
- Succeeded by: Albert Russell
- Constituency: Loudoun County
- In office May 3, 1784 – October 15, 1787 Serving with Francis Peyton
- Preceded by: Stevens Thomson Mason
- Succeeded by: Josiah Clapham
- Constituency: Loudoun County

Personal details
- Born: January 20, 1761 Leesylvania, Virginia Colony, British America
- Died: March 12, 1827 (aged 66) Washington, D.C., U.S.
- Party: Pro-Administration Party
- Spouse: Elizabeth Collins
- Relations: Brother of Major Gen. Henry ("Light Horse Harry") Lee III, Brother of Attorney General Charles Lee, Uncle of Robert E. Lee
- Children: Mary Ann Lee; Richard Bland Lee II; Ann Matilda (Lee) Washington; Mary Collins Lee; Cornelia (Lee) Marcrae; Zaccheus Collins Lee; Laura Lee; Nancy Ruth (Lee) Todd (Lee and his wife were also the parents of two stillborn children)
- Education: The College of William and Mary
- Occupation: Planter, judge

Richard Bland Lee I (January 20, 1761 – March 12, 1827) was an American planter, jurist, and politician from Fairfax County, Virginia. He was the son of Henry Lee II (1730–1787) of "Leesylvania" and Lucy Grymes (1734–1792) and the younger brother of both Maj. Gen. Henry ("Light Horse Harry") Lee (1756–1818) and of Charles Lee (1758–1815), Attorney General of the United States from 1795 to 1801, who served in both the Washington and Adams administrations.

== Early life and education ==
Richard Bland Lee, the third son of Henry Lee II, of the Lee Family of Virginia, and Lucy Grymes, was born on January 20, 1761, at Leesylvania, the estate built by his father on land overlooking the Potomac River in Prince William County in the Colony of Virginia. He was named after two distinguished relatives, his great-grandfather Richard Bland of "Jordan's Point", and his great-uncle, jurist and statesman Richard Bland, whom Thomas Jefferson called "the wisest man south of the James".

Possibly educated by tutors as a youth at "Chantilly", the home of his venerated cousin Richard Henry Lee in Westmoreland County, Virginia, Richard enrolled at the College of William and Mary in 1779. Though not directly involved in the Revolutionary war as his brother Henry Lee III was, Richard nevertheless took an active interest in the American cause. In June 1779 for example, Richard's uncle "Squire" Richard Lee of Lee Hall introduced a resolution in the House of Delegates that would authorize the building of a new statehouse. Though only eighteen years of age, Richard Bland Lee, in a letter written later that month, rebuked his famous uncle, characterizing the effort as "abominable ... [at a] ... time of public danger when our expenses are already unsupportable." On June 17 of the next year Richard was admitted to Phi Beta Kappa society, at that time the William and Mary debating society, through which he was able to refine his speaking skills. In December of that year, a British invasion fleet transporting newly minted British General Benedict Arnold and his troops appeared off Jamestown, prepared it seemed, to launch an advance upon Richmond. Phi Beta Kappa undertook to secure its papers against capture, and many of its members joined a hastily formed local militia company to offer at least some resistance to the expected invasion.

Richard Bland Lee may have been a part of this militia, or may have earlier returned to "Leesylvania" to "converse with his father about the future." Part of that future had apparently already been decided for him, as his father Henry Lee II had destined a part of his holdings on Cub Run to Richard, who it appears agreed to act on his father's behalf in managing this property sometime in 1780 or 1781. In 1787, he inherited 1,500 acres (6.1 km^{2}) of this holding from his father, land that would comprise the estate he would later name "Sully".

== Public life ==
=== Virginia House of Delegates ===
Loudoun County voters several times elected Richard Bland Lee as one of their two representatives in the Virginia House of Delegates from 1784 to 1788, 1796. During his second term in the state legislature, he was involved in debates surrounding the ratification of the United States Constitution. which he wholeheartedly supported. After ratification, he opposed efforts by Patrick Henry and others to call a second constitutional convention to add a bill of rights and believed the new system should be given a chance to operate before wholesale alterations were made. He also believed that the new congress could be trusted to add the necessary amendments.

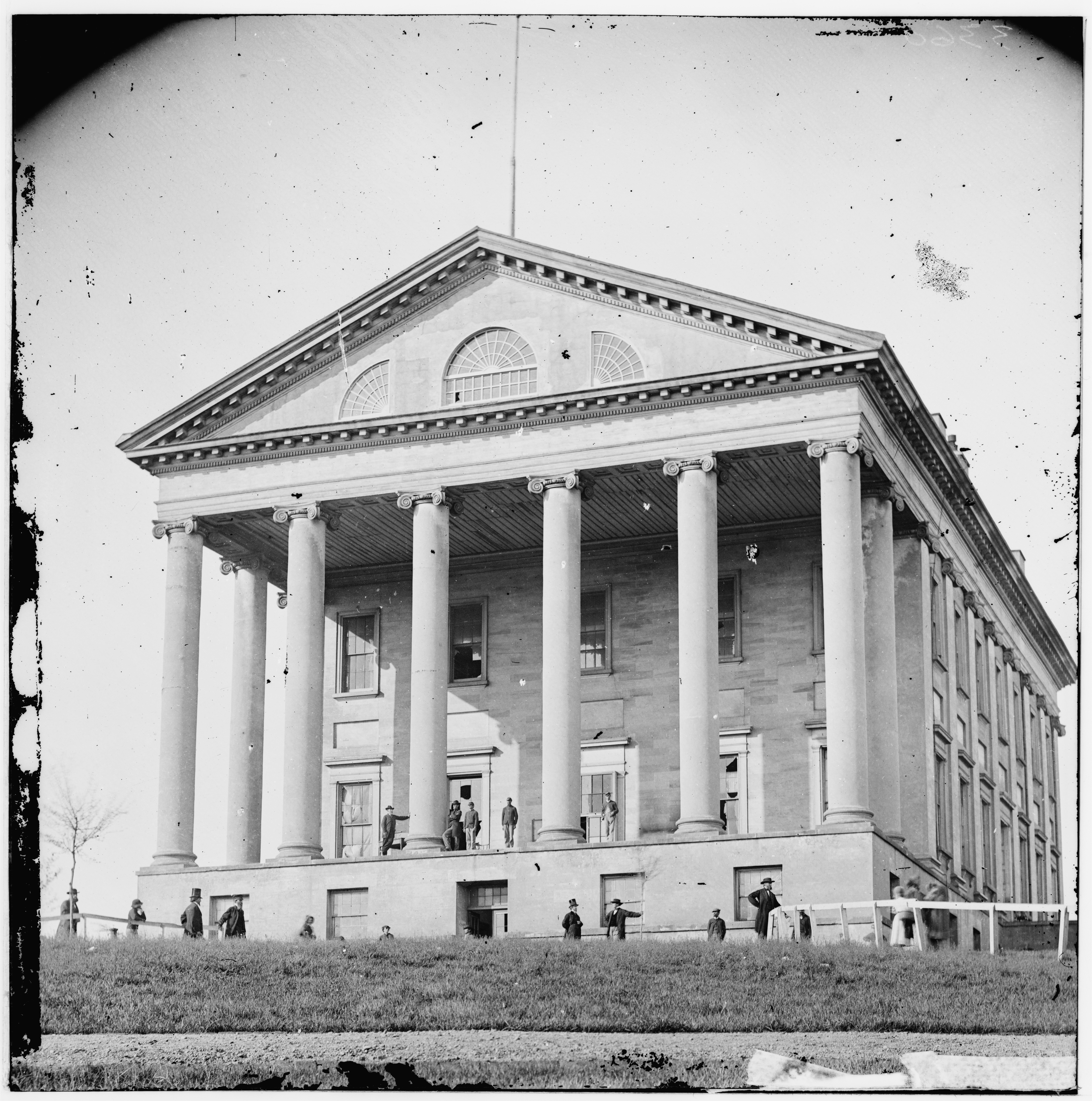
Virginia State Capitol built in 1785, as it appeared in 1865

It was also during his term that the election of Virginia's first two United States Senators took place. Lee was a strong supporter of James Madison's candidacy. Ultimately, however, Madison was rejected by the Henry-led House of Delegates on the assumption that he would not push for addition of a bill of rights, a contention that Lee worked hard to counteract. After that rejection. Lee continued to work on Madison's behalf in his congressional race by proposing publication of letters between Madison and others "as would counteract the report industriously circulated in the assembly and consequently in the state that you were opposed to every amendment to the new government, and in every mode...." Unwilling to risk publication of letters critical of others, Madison rejected the idea but would nevertheless defeat future President James Monroe in a hard-fought contest.

In both of the debates Lee recognized the power of Henry's oratory and lamented the weakness of opposition to him. A letter from Lee to Madison complained:

Our Assembly is weak. Mr. [Patrick] Henry is the only orator we have against us and the friends to the new government being all young and inexperienced, form a feeble bond against him.

While Henry was ultimately able to get the Virginia legislature to pass the measure urging Congress to call a new constitutional convention, Congress refused to do so but instead passed the first ten amendments to the constitution that make up the Bill of Rights.

=== US House of Representatives ===
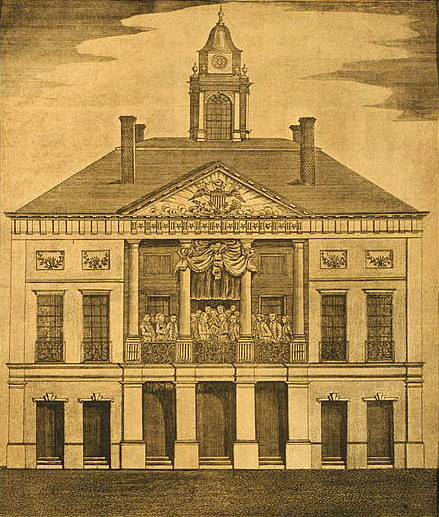
New York City Federal Hall, Seat of Congress. 1790 copper engraving by A. Doolittle, depicting Washington's April 30, 1789 inauguration.

I went up to the Election of a Representative to Congress for this district. [V]oted for Richd. Bland Lee Esqr.

— George Washington

In 1788, having served three years in the Virginia House of Delegates, Lee decided to stand for election to the new federal congress established under the recently ratified constitution. Though political parties had yet to form, ideological schisms were already developing by time of the first federal election. In general, those who were the strongest supporters of the constitution in the form adopted by the Constitutional Convention, including its provision for a strong executive with power tilted toward the federal government were identified as Federalists, and those who were less supportive of a strong federal government, and believed that a bill of rights should have been included with the document prior to ratification were called Anti-Federalists. Lee was identified with the former camp. He had strongly supported ratification of the constitution, opposed efforts to force a second constitutional convention for the purpose of adding a bill of rights, and was a strong supporter of George Washington. His district which included his estate, Sully, then part of Loudoun County (now Fairfax County), and included Fairfax County, was the home of both Washington as well as the Anti-Federalist leader George Mason.

Lee eventually became the consensus candidate of the Federalists by overcoming competition from likeminded men including his relative Ludwell Lee, William Fitzhugh, Martin Pickett, as well as two friends; Leven Powell and Dr. David Stuart. Opposing him for the Anti-Federalists was State Senator John Pope. Though there is little primary material describing the tenor of this first election, what exists hints at a hard-fought and sometimes dirty campaign. Pope was called "contemptible" in a letter from John Murray to Horatio Gates, and William Allason wrote to John Woodcock and described the contest: "I understand one makes very free with the other's Reputation &c by wch. I would not be surprised to hear of their having Exchanged a few dry blows." Lee eventually outpolled Pope by defeating him nearly four-to-one in Fairfax County alone, which included the vote of Washington.

On March 3, 1789, Richard Bland Lee began service as the first representative of Northern Virginia in the United States House of Representatives. He served three terms as a Pro-Administration (Federalist) member of congress from 1789 to 1795. He was a party to the Compromise of 1790 by which in exchange for support of southern delegates for federal assumption of state Revolutionary War debt, northern delegates voted to move the Federal City to a location in the south. His participation in that compromise, as well as his adherence to Federalist principles, proved to be his downfall. He narrowly fended off a challenge from his more famous relative Arthur Lee in 1792 and finally lost his seat to Richard Brent in the election of 1794.

Following that defeat, Richard was returned to the Virginia House of Delegates, first by Loudoun County voters in 1796 and finally by Fairfax County voters in 1799.

=== Other government service ===
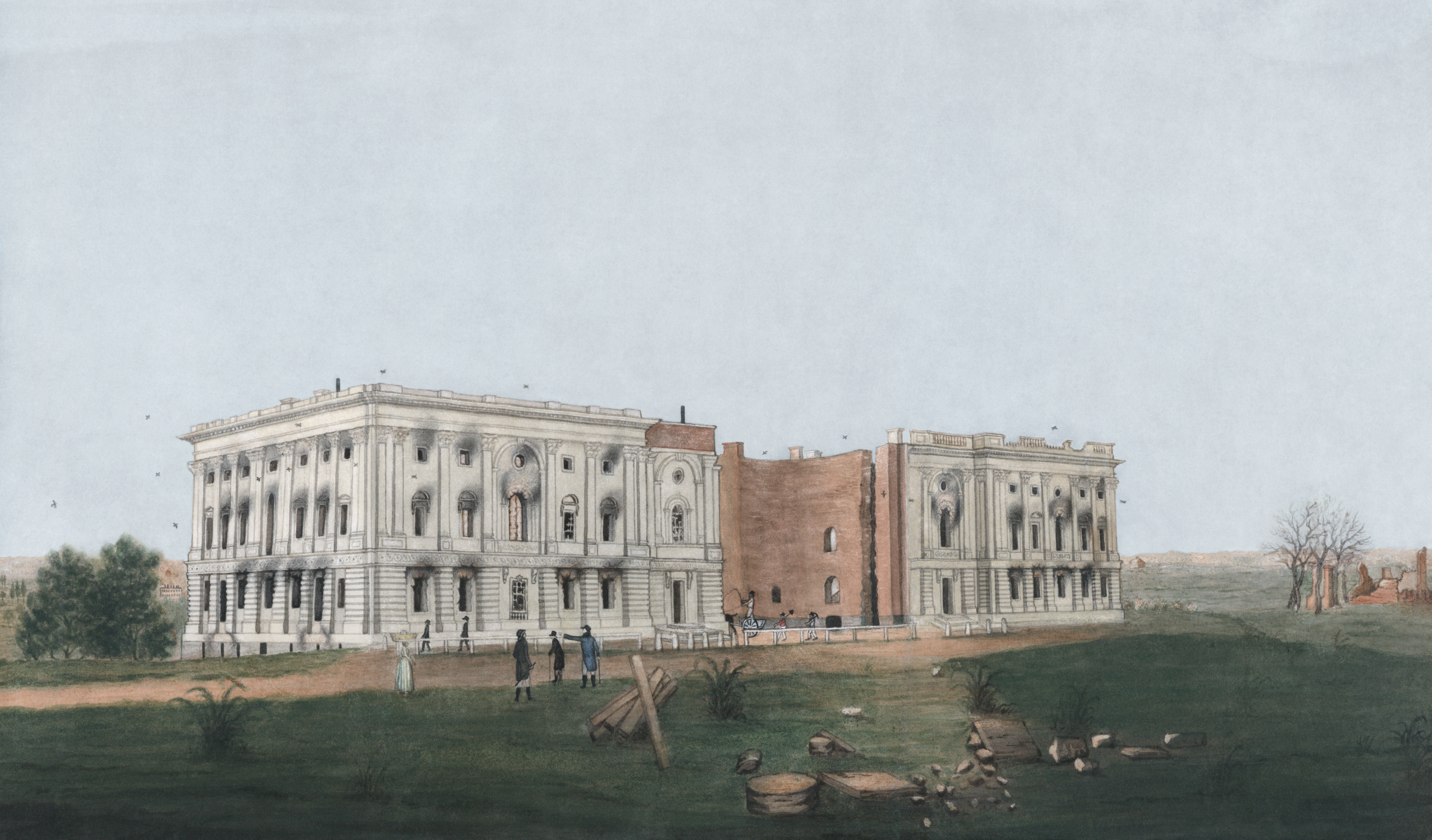
The United States Capitol after the burning of Washington, DC, in the War of 1812. Watercolor and ink depiction from 1814, restored.

Following his removal from "Sully" to Washington, DC in 1815, Richard, along with John Peter Van Ness and Tench Ringgold, was appointed by longtime friend President James Madison as one of three Commissioners to superintend the reconstruction of the Federal buildings damaged by British troops in the attack on Washington, DC, on August 24, 1814, during the War of 1812. After the expiration of that commission in 1816, President Madison intended to nominate Lee to the new position of "Commissioner of Public Buildings." However, after learning that the Senate would not confirm any of the three members of the previous commission because of their perceived ill treatment of Benjamin Latrobe, who had been appointed Architect of the Capitol to aid in its reconstruction, Richard was instead appointed by Madison as a commissioner to adjudicate claims arising out of the loss or destruction of property during the War of 1812. Lee occupied that position for two contentious years during which his decisions came in for harsh criticism by Congress. John Randolph of Virginia accused Lee of "malfeasance," and Congress finally appointed a "Committee of Claims" to look into the operation of Lee's office. Lee himself was exonerated of any corruption, but the committee noted that many "claimants had perpetrated an extensive 'system of fraud, forgery, and perhaps perjury." With his power severely curtailed, Lee, despondent over his treatment, left his position and for a short time seriously considered moving his family to Kentucky. Realizing that his prospects would be limited there and that his wife opposed the move, he decided to stay in Washington, DC. In 1819 he was appointed by President Monroe as a judge of the Orphans' Court of the District of Columbia, a position that he held until his death on March 12, 1827.

=== Societies ===
During the 1820s, Lee was a member of the prestigious society, Columbian Institute for the Promotion of Arts and Sciences, who counted among their members former presidents Andrew Jackson and John Quincy Adams and many prominent men of the day, including well-known representatives of the military, government service, medical, and other professions.

== Planter ==
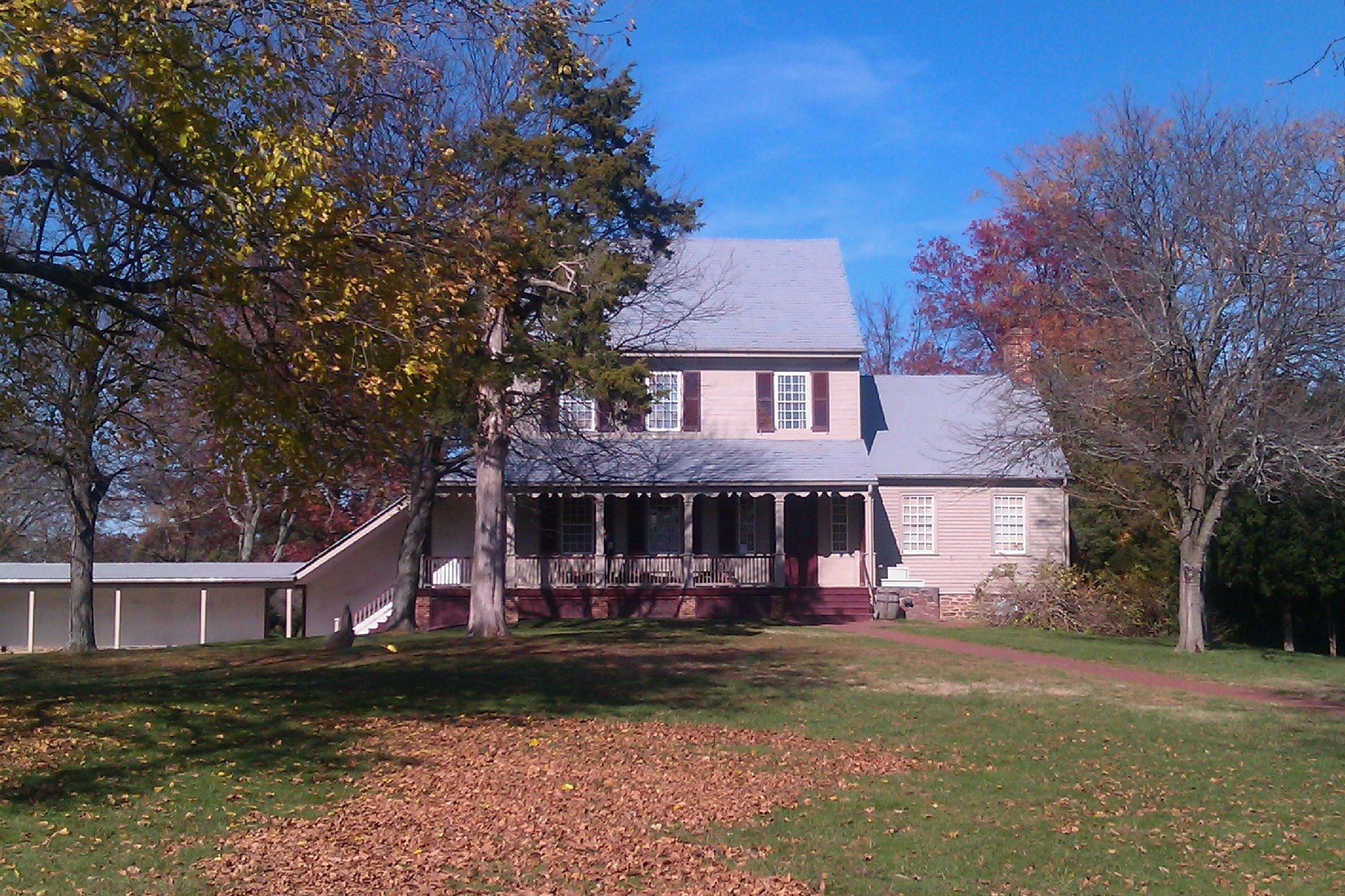
Sully, Home of Richard Bland Lee

Upon his death in 1787, Henry Lee II bequeathed 3,000 acres (12 km^{2}) of his Cub Run estates to be equally divided between his sons Richard Bland and Theodorick. Being the older of the two, Richard was given the more alluvial northern half, on which he already resided, having lived there as manager of the estate since approximately 1781. After his election to Congress, and for most of the next five years, Richard turned day-to-day management of his estate over to his brother Theodorick, who supervised spring planting, fall harvest, collection of rent from tenant farmers, and the construction of the large house Richard had planned for the estate on which construction had begun in 1794. Before he left for Congress in 1789, Richard had chosen a name for his estate, Sully. The exact origin of the name is unknown, though Robert S. Gamble in Sully: Biography of a House speculates that Sully was named after "Chateau de Sully" in the Valley of Loire in France. According to Gamble, "if he turned to a specific source, it was doubtless the Memoires of Maximilien de Bethune, Duke of Sully and France's Minister of Finance under Henry IV." This work was well known among wealthy Virginians in the late 18th century.

Upon his defeat for reelection to Congress, Richard returned to "Sully" and took over primary operation of his estate. Determined to steer clear of the untenable practices characteristic of the tobacco monoculture which predominated in Virginia, Richard, like George Washington whom he idolized, applied modern methods of farming designed to diversify production and to halt depletion of the soil. To the end he switched to growing staple crops - wheat, rye, barley, corn and timothy, fruit trees - apple to produce cider, and peach for the making of peach brandy. He planted clover to help replenish the soil and he "tried crop rotation and the application of nutrients, especially crushed limestone, to fields where productivity was decreasing." During this period he either abandoned or severely limited the growing of tobacco at "Sully." He planted large vegetable gardens and in 1801 Richard built a dairy house constructed with red Seneca stone.

Construction on the large house was begun in 1794 and completed in 1795. It is a "Federal"- or "Georgian"-style home of two and a half stories. He erected a 1 1/2-story addition in 1799 coincident with the wedding of Portia Lee who, along with her sister Cornelia Lee had come to live with Richard and Elizabeth Lee under their guardianship. Driven into significant debt trying to aid his brothers Maj. Gen. Henry ("Light Horse Harry") Lee and Charles Lee extricate themselves from severe financial difficulties, Richard sold "Sully" in 1811 to a cousin, Francis Lightfoot Lee (1782–1858). Richard Bland and Elizabeth Lee initially moved to a home in Alexandria, then to a country home called Strawberry Vale near Scott's Run (current site of Tysons Corner), and finally to the historic Thomas Law House at Sixth and N Streets, Southwest in Washington, DC.

Sully is located at Chantilly, just off U.S. Route 50, on State Route 28, the southern access road to Dulles International Airport. It is owned and operated as a museum house by the Fairfax County Park Authority.

== Marriage and children ==
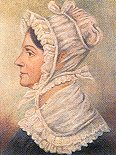
Elizabeth (Collins) Lee (c. 1768–1858)

Richard married Elizabeth Collins (c. 1768–1858) in 1794, at her parents' home in Germantown, PA. Elizabeth was the daughter of Philadelphia Quaker merchant Stephen Collins and Mary Parrish, and the sister of Zaccheus Collins, a prominent botanist. Her lifelong friend was Dolley Payne Todd Madison.

1. Mary Ann Lee born May 11, 1795, died June 21, 1796, of dysentery. Buried at Sully in unmarked grave.
2. Col. Richard Bland Lee II born July 20, 1797, died August 2, 1875. Married Julia Anna Marion Prosser (1806–1882), daughter of John Prosser and Mary "Polly" Poole. Both buried at Ivy Hill Cemetery, Alexandria, Va.
3. Ann Matilda Lee born July 13, 1799, died December 20, 1880. Married Dr. Baily Washington III (1787–1854).
4. Mary Collins Lee born May 6, 1801, died February 22, 1805. Buried at Sully in unmarked grave.
5. Laura Lee born May 10, 1803, died in infancy.
6. Cornelia Lee born March 20, 1804, died December 26, 1876. Married Dr. James W. F. Marcrae.
7. Hon. Zaccheus Collins Lee born December 5, 1805, died November 1859 in Baltimore, MD; Served as U.S. District Attorney from 1848 to 1855. Married Martha Jenkins.
8. Male Infant born April 15, 1807, died April 15, 1807.
9. Male Infant stillborn June 11, 1809.

== Death ==
Richard died in Washington, D.C., and was buried in the Congressional Cemetery there in 1827. In 1975 he was reinterred at his home, Sully near Chantilly, Virginia.

His home is now open to visitors as a county park.

== Ancestry ==
Lee Family Coat of Arms

Richard Bland Lee was the son of Henry Lee II (1730–1787) of "Leesylvania" and, Lucy Grymes (1734–1792).

- Lucy Grymes Lee was the daughter of Hon. Charles Grymes (1693–1743) and Frances Jennings.

Henry Lee, II, was the third son of Capt. Henry Lee I (1691–1747) of "Lee Hall", Westmoreland County, and his wife, Mary Bland (1704–1764).

- Mary Bland Lee was the daughter of Hon. Richard Bland I (1665–1720) and his second wife, Elizabeth Randolph (1685–1719).

Henry Lee, I, was the son of Col. Richard Lee II, Esq., "the scholar" (1647–1715) and Laetitia Corbin (c. 1657–1706).

- Laetitia Corbin Lee was the daughter of Richard's neighbor and, Councillor, Hon. Henry Corbin, Sr. (1629–1676) and Alice (Eltonhead) Burnham (c. 1627–1684).

Richard Lee, II, was the son of Col. Richard Lee I, Esq., "the immigrant" (1618–1664) and Anne Constable (c. 1621–1666).

- Anne Constable Lee was the daughter of Thomas Constable and a ward of Sir John Thoroughgood.

U.S. House of Representatives
Preceded by District established	Member of the U.S. House of Representatives from Virginia's 4th congressional district 1789–1793	Succeeded by Francis Preston
Preceded by District established	Member of the U.S. House of Representatives from Virginia's 17th congressional district 1793–1795	Succeeded by Richard Brent
