= Strawberry Vale Manor =

Coordinates: 38.9227°N 77.2187°W

Strawberry Vale Manor was built in about 1780 (246 years ago) on land that later became part of Tysons Corner, Virginia, United States. It was located about 200 yards (180 m) from Virginia State Highway 123 just west of the Capital Beltway. Prior to 1811, the residence was owned by John C. Scott, and transferred by him to the ownership of Theodorick Lee, younger brother of former Congressman Richard Bland Lee in that year. After selling their estate "Sully" in 1811 to Francis Lightfoot Lee, Richard Bland and Elizabeth Collins Lee lived for a brief time in Alexandria, Virginia before purchasing Strawberry Vale from Theodorick Lee in 1812, netting Theodorick an $8,000 profit. They lived at Strawberry Vale until 1814 when the property was transferred to the Gantt family. Ann Beale Wilson Gantt ran Strawberry Vale as a seminary until it was closed at the onset of the American Civil War.

Strawberry Vale Manor was demolished in 1958 (68 years ago) to make way for the Capital Beltway that encircles Washington, DC.
