= Henry Lee IV =

American biographer and historian (1787–1837)

- Born: May 28, 1787; Stratford, Virginia
- Died: January 30, 1837 (aged 49); Paris, France
- Other name: "Black-Horse Harry"
- Occupations: Biographer; Historian
- Spouse: Anne Robinson McCarty (m. 1817)
- Relatives: See Lee family

Henry "Black-Horse Harry" Lee IV (28 May 1787 – 30 January 1837) was an American biographer and historian, born in Stratford, Virginia, the son of Major-General Henry "Light-Horse Harry" Lee III and Matilda Lee, members of the Lee Family of Virginia. He was a half-brother of Confederate general Robert E. Lee. He was educated at Washington Academy in Lexington, Virginia, and in 1808 graduated from the College of William & Mary. (Washington Academy later developed as Washington and Lee University, renamed for Henry's younger half-brother Robert, who served as head of the school after the Civil War, long after Henry studied there.)

== Politics ==
Lee Family Coat of Arms

Henry Lee IV served as a speechwriter for Andrew Jackson. After Jackson won election to the presidency in 1828, Lee, along with Jackson and William Berkeley Lewis, helped write the inaugural address. President Jackson rewarded him with a consular appointment to Algeria; the Senate, however, refused the confirmation.

In his remaining seven years of his life, Henry Lee traveled abroad, dying in Paris, France.

== Family ==
On 29 March 1817 he married Anne Robinson McCarty, daughter of Daniel McCarty and Margaret Robinson. Anne and Henry had one child, Margaret. Margaret was born in autumn of 1818, and died at the age of two in a tragic accident.

Lee's nickname of "Black-Horse" — a pun on the nickname of his famous father, "Light-Horse" Harry Lee — originated in a scandal two years after his daughter's death. Lee began an illicit affair with his wife's young sister, Elizabeth, who was his ward at the time. According to at least one version of the story, Elizabeth became pregnant, although there's no record of the child having survived. The McCarty family brought suit to remove Lee as trustee of Elizabeth's inheritance and recovery of the money. Unbeknownst to the McCartys, Lee had misappropriated a portion of the trust for upkeep of Stratford Hall Plantation, the Lee family's ancestral home for six generations. In order to conceal the misappropriation, Lee attempted unsuccessfully to marry Elizabeth off to an unscrupulous suitor. The legal fallout and resulting scandal forced Lee to sell Stratford out of the family. Elizabeth McCarty lived at Stratford for 50 years, from 1829 until her death in 1879.

Anne Lee, who had become addicted to morphine in an attempt to recover from grief at the death of her daughter, fled to Tennessee. She was often a guest of future president Andrew Jackson and his wife. Henry Lee later followed, beseeching his wife for forgiveness. Andrew Jackson befriended Lee and began to assist in rehabilitating him in political and social life.

== Literary works ==
- The Campaign of 1781 in the Carolinas. 1824
- Observations on the Writings of Thomas Jefferson. 1832
- The Life of Emperor Napoleon. 1835
