= Battle of Edgar's Lane =

1778 skirmish in Hastings-on-Hudson, New York

Coordinates: 40°59′54″N 73°52′53″W

- Part of American Revolutionary War
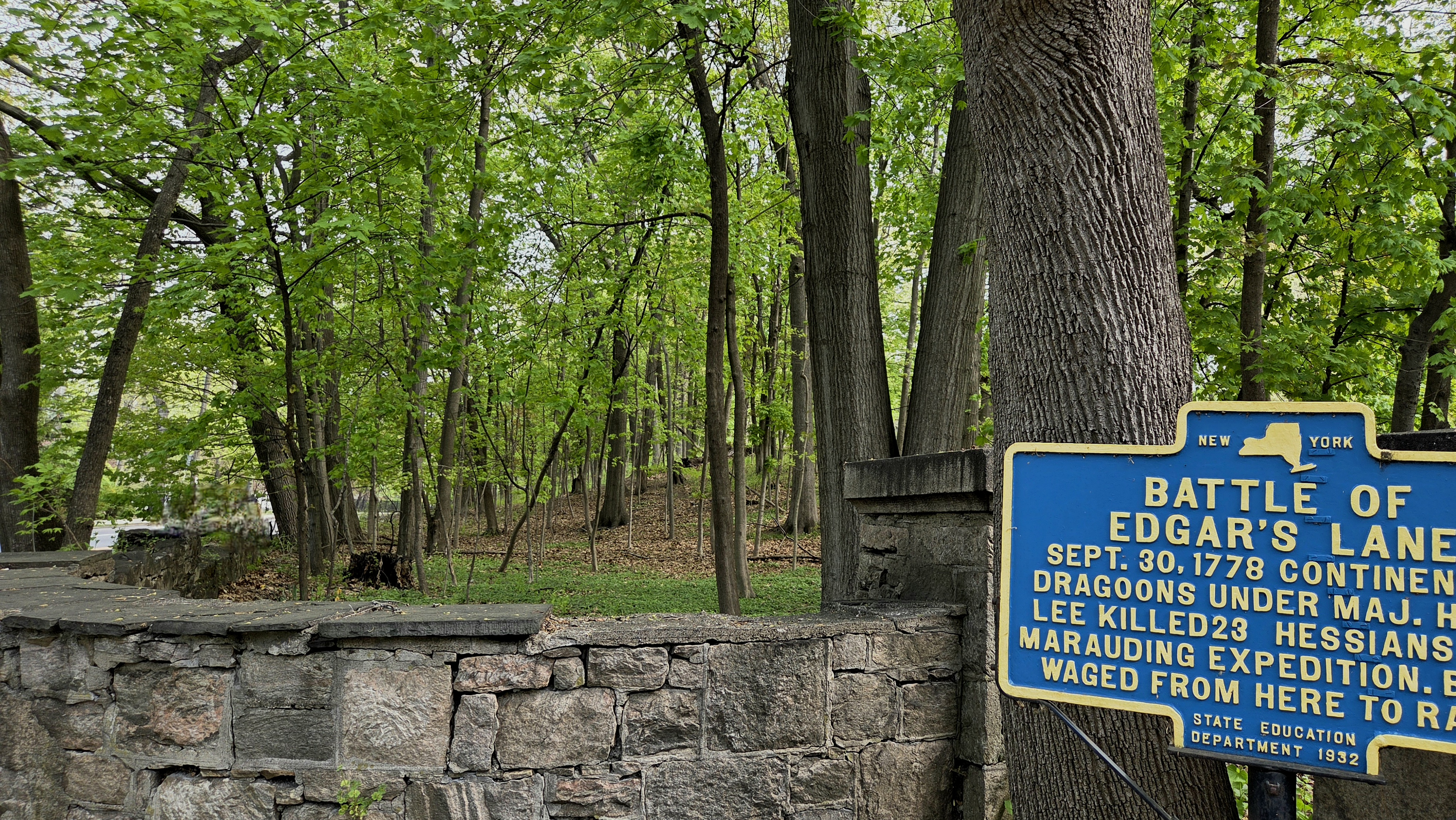
- Battle site
Date	September 30, 1778
Location	Hastings-on-Hudson, New York
Result	Continental victory

Belligerents
Hessians	Continental Army

Commanders and leaders
Karl Moritz von Donop	Henry Lee III

Units involved
80	120

Casualties and losses
23	

The Battle of Edgar's Lane was a skirmish in the American Revolutionary War on September 30, 1778, between a force of 80 Hessians and 120 Continental dragoons under Major Henry Lee. The skirmish was fought in the village of Hastings-on-Hudson, New York. The skirmish would be a morale-boosting victory for the Continental Army and Major Henry Lee.

Previously the British army secured a victory during a sneak attack at the Baylor Massacre. This happened in Riverdale, New Jersey where a large British surprise attack occurred during one and three o'clock in the morning. The British snuck into a town filled with 116 men of the 3rd Regiment of Continental Light Dragoons. There were 15 continental casualties, and 54 wounded or captured. The British led by Maj. Gen. Sir Charles Grey, Major Turner Straubenzee and Major John Maitland only had one casualty.

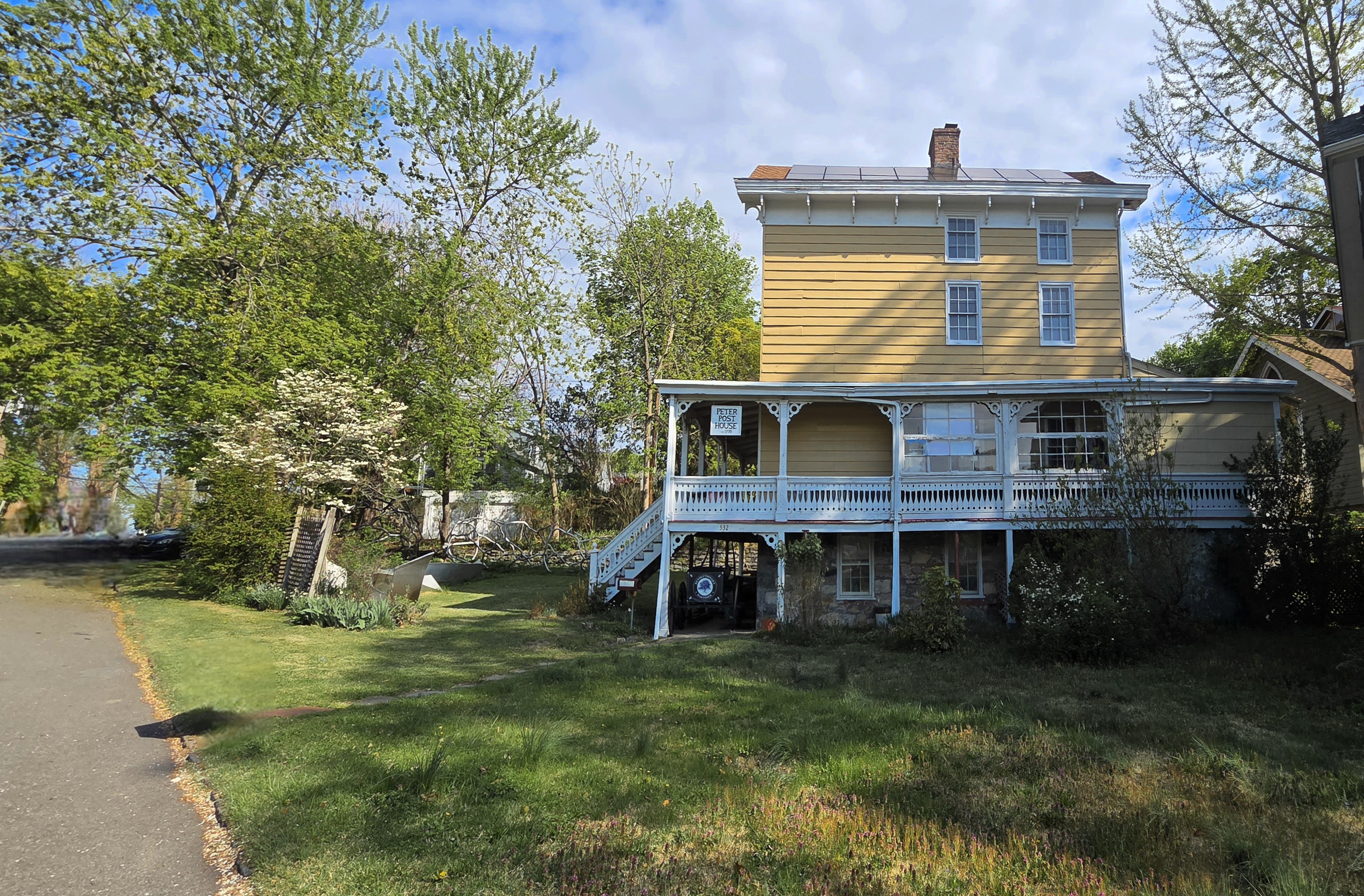
Post-Baker House in 2026

Peter Post, a local tenant farmer, heard word of a Hessian marauding party that would be coming through the next day. He sent word to the Continental troops, who organized a force of 120 dragoons to ambush the Hessians. When the Hessians rode through as expected the next day, Post told them that there were no American soldiers in the area and directed them towards Edgar's Lane, where the dragoons were hidden in the surrounding trees. When the Hessians rode through, the Continental dragoons fired a volley, killing some Hessians. The surviving Hessians ran towards the ravine on the Hudson River, the dragoons giving chase. Many Hessians fell down the ravine. Some Hessians were shot in the water, others drowned, and the rest were taken prisoner. In all, the Continental dragoons killed 23 Hessians, winning the skirmish, along with losing no men. Days after the battle, the Hessians returned and beat Post "within an inch of his life."

Peter Post's house still stands. Known as the Post-Baker House, the building is a private residence marked by a historical sign. Two markers have stood on the site of the battle for several decades. One, a New York State plaque commemorating the battle, stands on the corner of Edgar's Lane and Broadway. The other, a boulder-mounted commemorative bronze plaque dedicated by the Daughters of the American Revolution in 1938 sits at the east edge of Wagner Park, on the site of where the battle took place. Most recently, a commemorative installation titled "Revolutionary Walk" was dedicated to the public on September 30, 2021, the 243rd anniversary of the battle. The installation sits within Sheldon Wagner Park in Hastings-on-Hudson and features a landscaped plaza with seating. Six illustrated panels in the Walk explore the historical context surrounding the battle, details of the engagement itself, and a summary of the aftermath. Revolutionary Walk was created by the members of Revolutionary Hastings, "a committee of the Hastings Historical Society, dedicated to developing new awareness of the Battle of Edgar’s Lane and its context in the American Revolutionary War."

The battle is named after the lane retroactively. At the time of the skirmish in 1778, the encounter was actually unnamed or occasionally referred to as the "Mertz Affair" after Lieutenant Balthazar Mertz (or Merz), the defeated Hessian lieutenant.

Part of the action of Austin Wright's novel Tony and Susan takes place on Edgar's Lane, and the battle is mentioned.
