= Sully Historic Site =

Historic house in Virginia, United States

- Sully
- U.S. National Register of Historic Places
- Virginia Landmarks Register
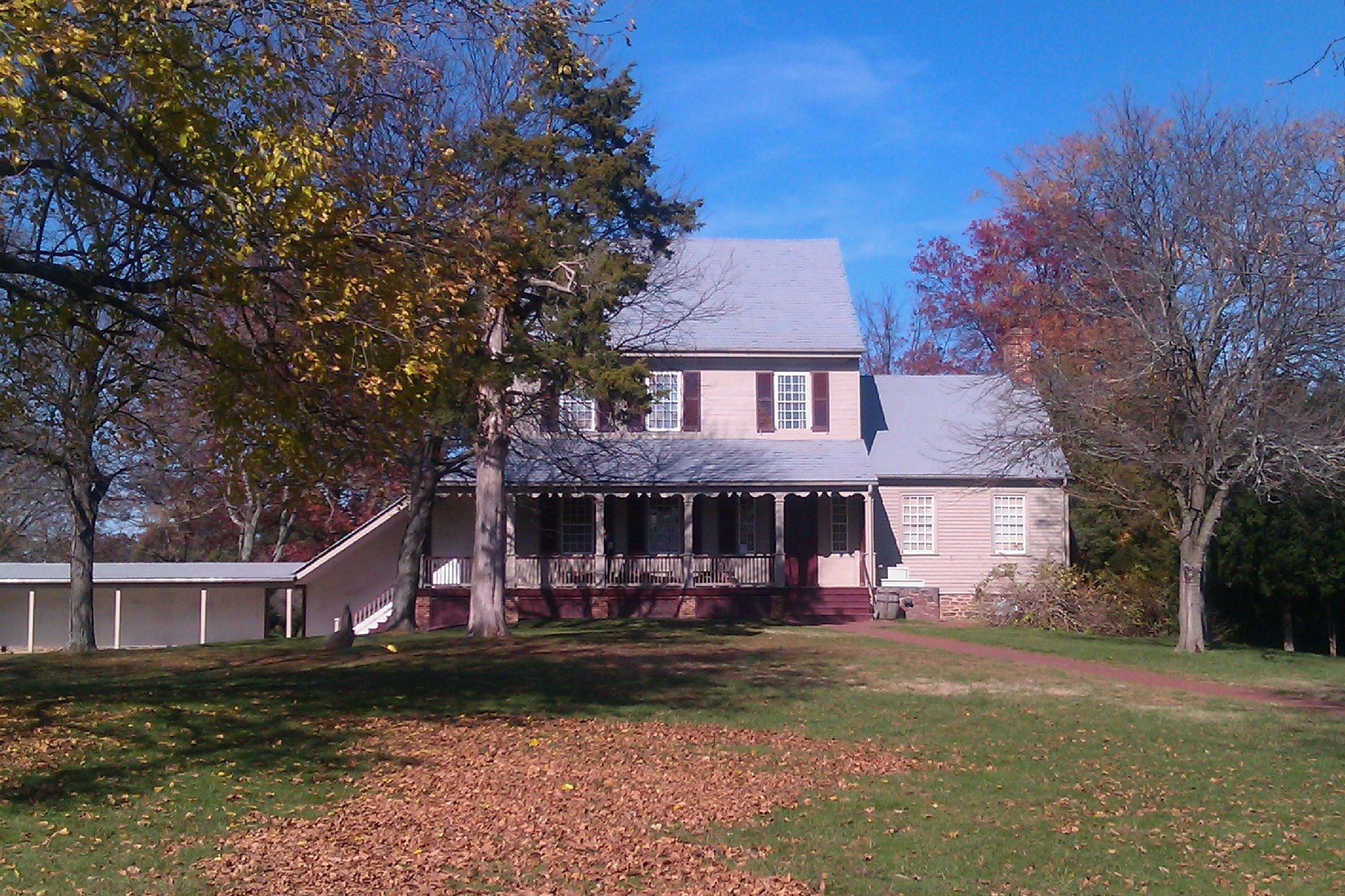
- Sully Main House

- Location within Northern Virginia Location within Virginia Location within the United States
- Location: 3650 Historic Sully Way Chantilly, VA 20151
- Coordinates: 38°54′29″N 77°25′56″W
- Area: 65 acres (26 ha)
- Built: 1794
- Website: Sully Historic Site
- NRHP reference No.: 70000793
- VLR No.: 029-0037

Significant dates
- Added to NRHP: December 18, 1970
- Designated VLR: October 6, 1970

Sully Historic Site, is both a Virginia landmark and nationally registered historic place in Chantilly, Virginia.

The earliest recorded claim to the land was made by the Doeg. Later the Lee family of Virginia owned the land from 1725 to 1839. Richard Bland Lee (Note: Northern Virginia's first Representative to Congress, brother of Henry 'Light Horse Harry' Lee III and Charles Lee, and uncle to Robert E. Lee) did not build the main house until 1794. Following the purchase by William Swartwort in 1838, Sully was used as a home, a working farm, or both by a series of private owners. Then in 1958, Sully was acquired by the federal government as a part of the area to be used for the construction of Dulles Airport. Today the Fairfax County Park Authority operates the site with a specific focus on the Lee family.

== History ==
=== Pre-Lee period ===
The land that would become part of Sully was likely controlled by several groups before the Doeg claimed the area. English settlers encountered Algonquian language speaking members of the Doeg in modern-day Northern Virginia. The Doeg are most well known for their raid in July 1675 that became a part of Bacon's Rebellion. English colonists settling in modern Northern Virginia came into conflict with the Doeg from 1661 to 1664. When diplomatic attempts failed, the governor sent the Rappahannock County militia in June 1666. The specifics of that military action are unclear, but later land grants to English settlers are not disputed, suggesting the English gained control of the area. The English presumptively took control after a violent conflict with the Doeg in 1666. Little is recorded about the disposition of this land from the time when the English gained control of it until the land is patented by the Lee family of Virginia.

=== Lee period ===
Originally acquired in 1725 by Richard Bland Lee's grandfather, Henry Lee I, Sully was inherited by Richard's father Henry Lee II of "Leesylvania". At his death in 1787, the land was divided between Richard and his younger brother Theodorick Lee. Being the older of the two, Richard was given the more alluvial northern half, having resided there as manager of the property since approximately 1781. During this period the predominant crop grown was tobacco.

==== Richard Bland Lee ====
Richard severely curtailed tobacco production in favor of more sustainable crops, including wheat, corn, rye, and barley. This reduced the soil depletion inherent to tobacco production, and allowed for the practice of crop rotation. He also planted fruit orchards, including peach and apple trees, which he used to produce spirits. In 1801 Richard constructed a dairy, which ran primarily under the supervision of his wife Elizabeth Collins Lee.

After his election to the United States Congress in 1789, and for most of the next five years, Richard turned day-to-day management of his estate over to his brother Theodorick, who supervised spring planting and fall harvest. Theodorick also managed the collection of rent from tenant farmers and the construction of the large house Richard had planned for the estate, on which construction had begun in 1794. Before he left for Congress in 1789, Richard had chosen the name "Sully" for his estate.

By 1811, having been drawn into heavy debt trying to aid his brothers, Henry Lee III and Charles Lee, extricate themselves from severe financial difficulties, Richard Bland Lee decided he could no longer sustain ownership of Sully. Accordingly, he decided to sell the plantation to raise cash to pay some of the debt. He sold Sully for $18,000 to his second cousin, Francis Lightfoot Lee II, son of Richard Henry Lee.

==== Francis Lightfoot Lee II ====
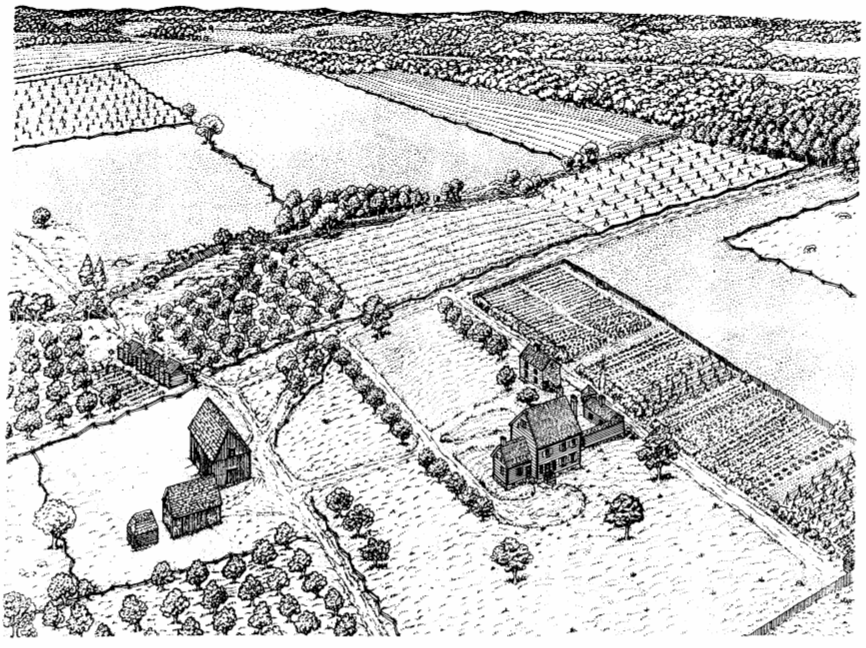
1801

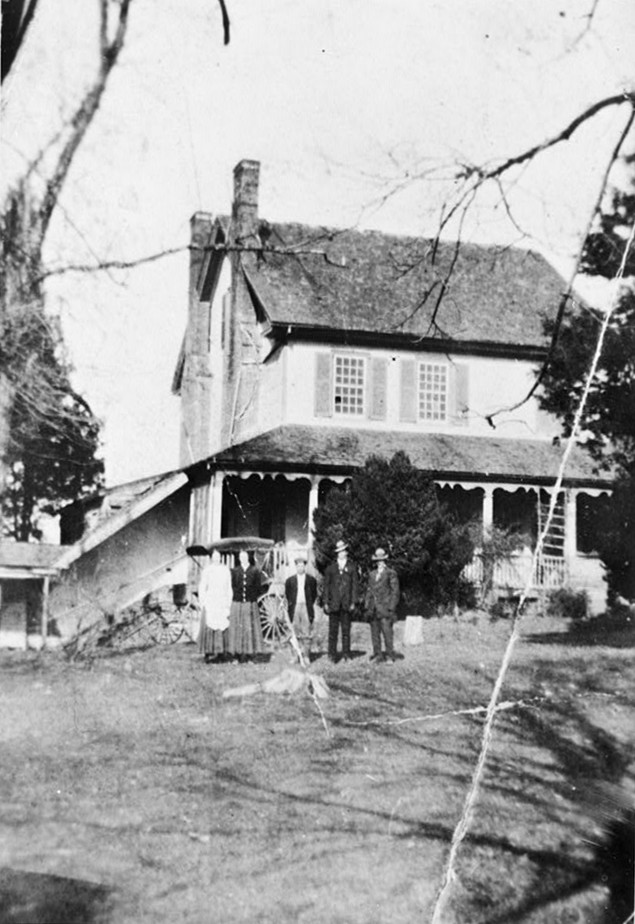
1933

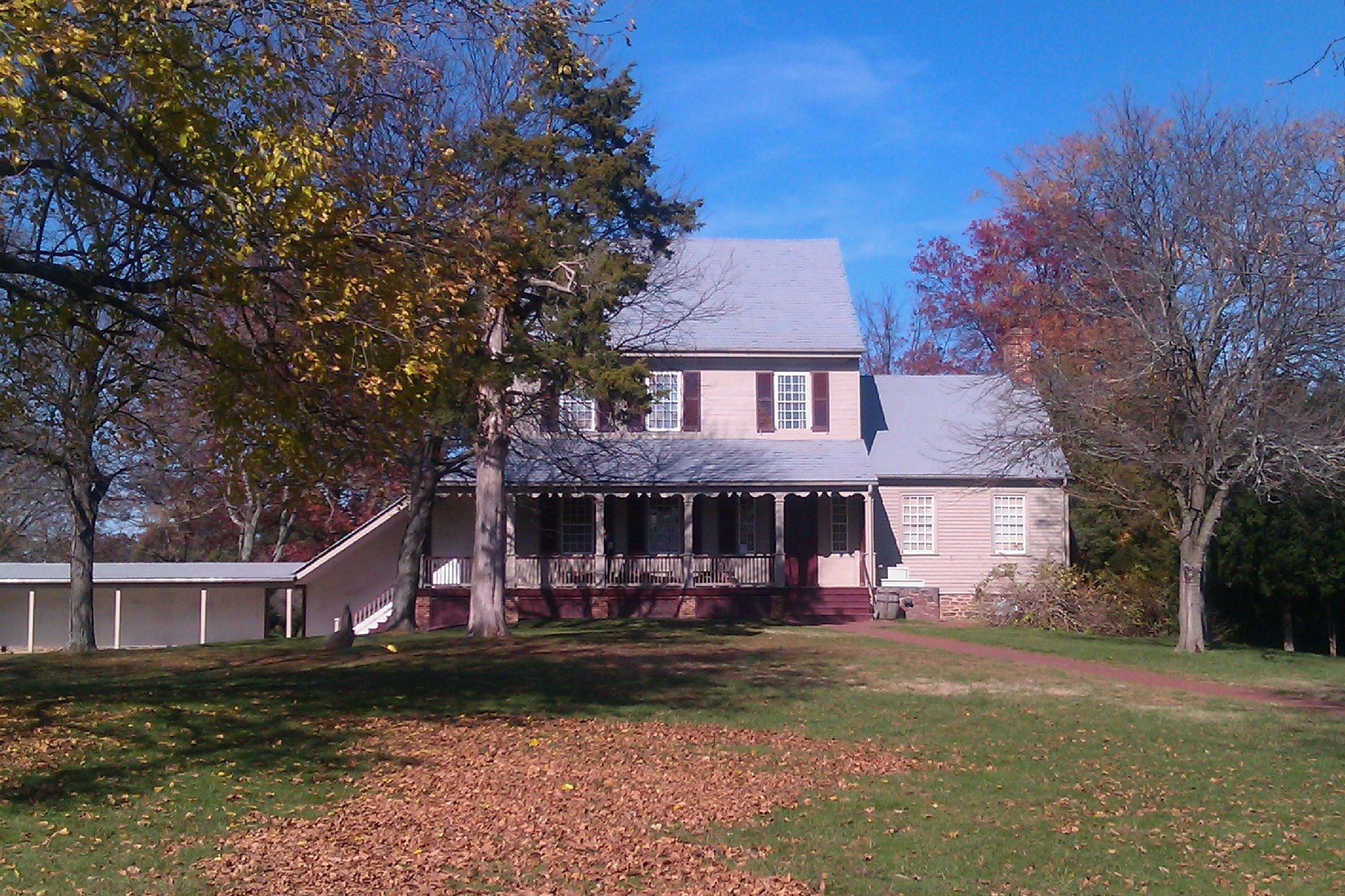
2011

For several years after his purchase of Sully, Francis Lightfoot Lee II, (Note: Francis Lightfoot Lee II, called F. L. by his family, attended Phillips Academy then Harvard and graduated with a bachelor of arts degree in 1802, then completed a master of arts degree in 1806. After the death of his first wife, Elizabeth Fitzgerald in 1808, he married Jane Fitzgerald, half-sister to Elizabeth Fitzgerald in 1810. Jane and F. L. together raised five children, including future US Navy Rear Admiral Samuel Phillips Lee. Cornish and Laas argue that F. L. suffered from depression.) called F. L. by his family, was able to realize an annual profit of $1,500 to $2,500. At least part of that success was due to the "judicious system of husbandry" employed by F. L.'s wife Jane Fitzgerald Lee. Then in 1816, due to complications during the delivery of their fifth child Frances Ann Lee, Jane Fitzgerald Lee died. Four years later in 1820, F. L. had either a nervous breakdown or stroke. Unable to care for himself, he was committed to the Pennsylvania Hospital in Philadelphia in 1825.

Following the breakdown, Sully was placed under the administrative care of F. L.'s nephew Richard Henry Lee II. Richard Henry Lee II's management was marked by negligence and apparent apathy towards the dishonesty of managers who were embezzling money from the estate:

… mismanagement, having allowed an estate clear of debt, well stocked, well arranged under a good system as it had been for years' according to 'the universal belief and opinion of all friends, connections and neighbors' to be 'wasted and the debts lost.' ... Colonel W.C.B. Butler replaced Richard Henry Lee (Note: meaning Richard Henry Lee II) as the 'Committee' for the Estate on January 1, 1827, but Butler also proved unsatisfactory. On June 23, 1830 the county court ordered his removal and, 'for the safekeeping and good management' of the estate ...

Control of Sully was next placed in the hands of Colonel George Washington Hunter in 1830. Gamble claims, "in no hands ... would Sully fare as well as when it had been assiduously maintained by a single, devoted, industrious proprietor."

After their father's move to the Pennsylvania Hospital during the summer of 1825, F. L.'s children (with the exception of Samuel Philips Lee who had entered the Navy), were under the care of William Brent, Jr. and Winifred Brent. The Brents were relatives who had moved to Sully to care for the Lee children and to start at Sully, a "select seminary" for boys and girls.

During subsequent years, as the Lee children grew older they began to leave Sully. Samuel Phillps Lee had entered the Navy, and John Lee went to West Point. Arthur Lee moved west to the Ohio country, while his oldest daughter Jane Elizabeth Lee married Henry Tazewell Harrison in a sunrise ceremony at Sully on February 6, 1834. With his brothers-in-law absent from the estate, Harrison took over representing their interests with the appointed administrator, Colonel Hunter, whom he replaced on July 18, 1836. Finally, in 1838, after a bizarre period, in which the estate had ostensibly been sold to a buyer who was arrested in England prior to completing the purchase, Sully was sold to merchant William Swartwort.

=== Post-Lee period ===
Starting in 1838 Sully was used as a home, working farm, or both by Swartwort, then Haight, Haight, Barlow, Shear, Shear, Miller, Poston, Thurston, then Nolting. The federal government acquired the property in 1958 to construct Dulles Airport. A campaign to save the site began almost immediately afterwards. Those involved included previous owners of the property, Lee descendants, and a neighbor, Eddie Wagstaff, who later endowed the Sully Foundation that still provides support for the site. This campaign ended in 1959 when President Dwight D. Eisenhower signed legislation making Sully a national historic site.

The Fairfax County Park Authority agreed to operate the site as a county historical park, and has since acquired an additional 60 acres (240,000 m^{2}; 2,600,000 sq ft; 24 ha) to bring the total size of Sully Historic Site to approximately 120 acres (490,000 m^{2}; 5,200,000 sq ft; 49 ha). The site's historic period of significance encompasses the ownership of Richard Bland Lee and Francis Lighfoot Lee (1787–1838). Interpretation at the site reflects the ownership of its founder Richard Bland Lee, which explains the park authority decision to have Sully "completely furnished with antiquities from the Federal period."

=== Chain of ownership ===
- 1725–1747 Henry Lee I
- 1747–1787 Henry Lee II
- 1787–1811 Richard Bland Lee
- 1811–1839 Francis Lightfoot Lee II purchased estate from his second cousin
- 1838–1841 William Swartwort
- 1842–1842 Jacob and Amy Haight
- 1842–1852 Alexander Haight
- 1852–1869 James and Marie Haight Barlow
- 1869–1874 Stephen Shear
- 1874–1910 Conrad Shear
- 1910–1919 William Eads Miller, real estate agent
- 1919–1939 King and Rebecca Poston converted Sully to a dairy farm
- 1939–1946 Walter Thurston, United States ambassador to Mexico
- 1946–1958 Frederick E. Nolting, Jr., United States ambassador to South Vietnam
- 1958–1959 Federal Aviation Administration
- 1959–present Fairfax County Park Authority

=== HABS Drawings ===
1960 Historic American Buildings Survey Drawings

== Outbuildings ==
=== Kitchen / Laundry ===
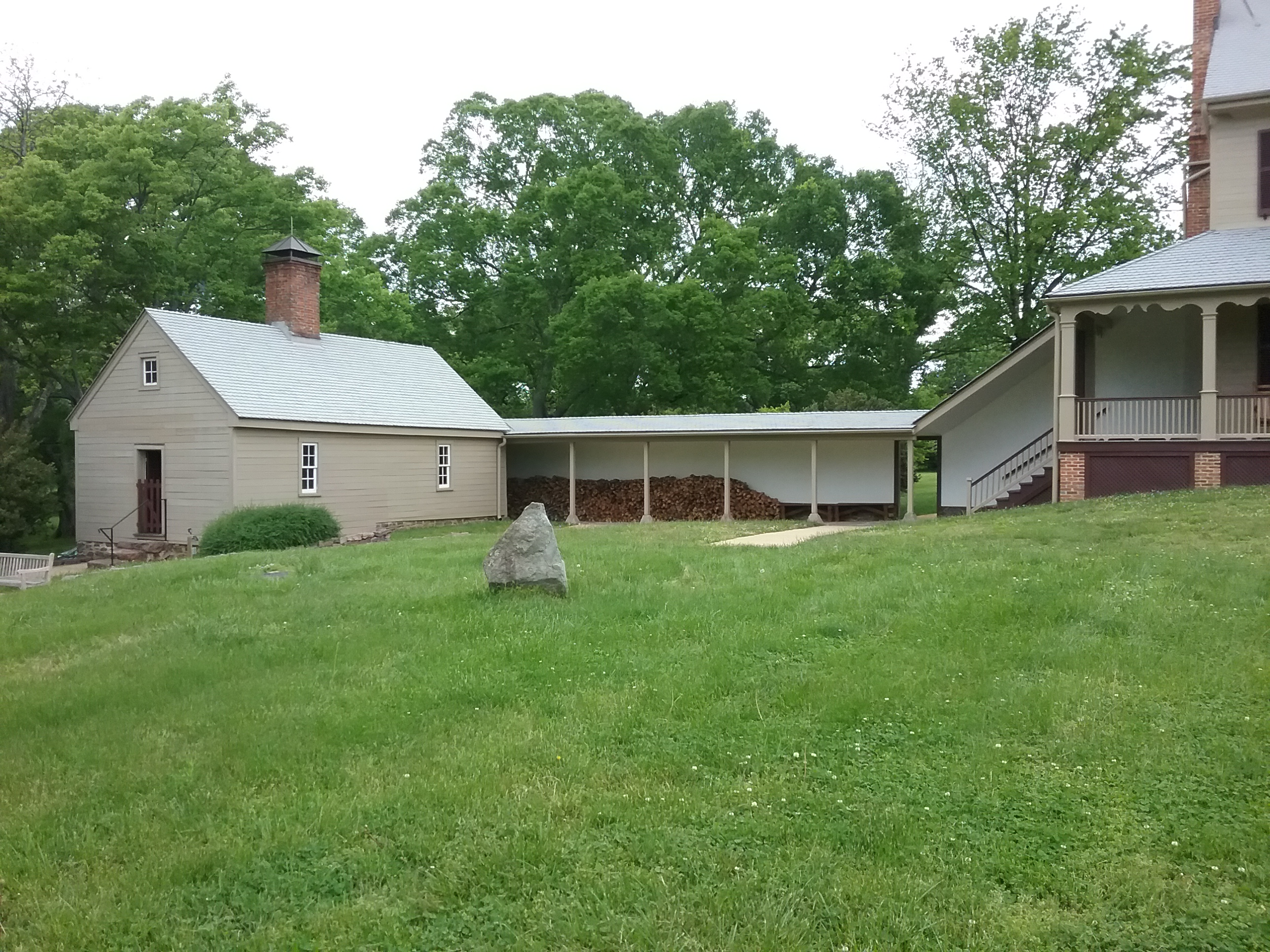
Kitchen / Laundry building at the West end of the Main House.

The kitchen / laundry building is divided in two by a large double fireplace. One fireplace faces the kitchen on the side nearest the main house, the other fireplace faces the laundry. Both fireplaces are served by the large chimney that comes through the center of the roof.

The kitchen building was built at the same time as the main house.

1960 Historic American Buildings Survey drawings of the Kitchen

=== Stone Dairy ===
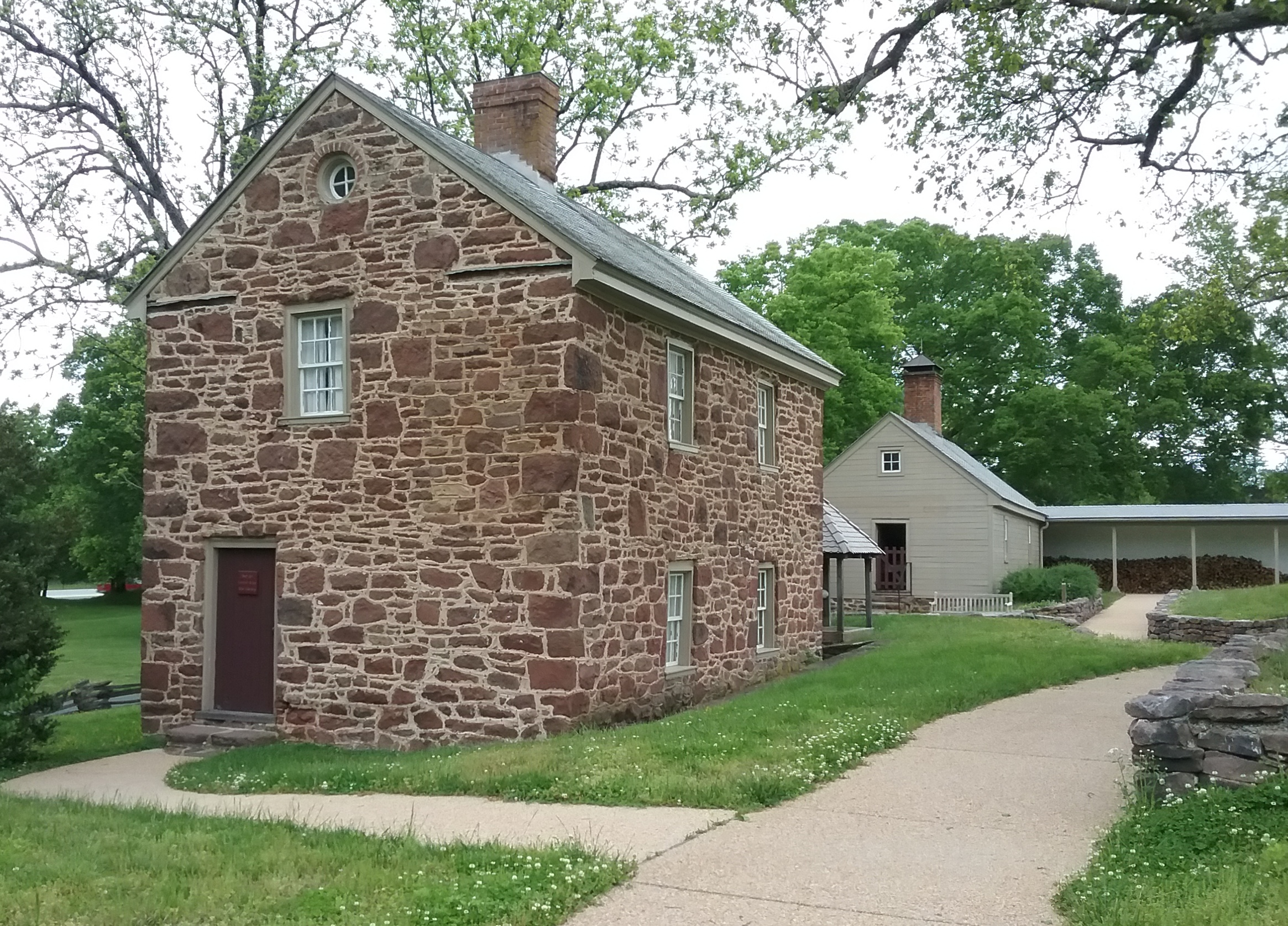
Stone Dairy. South of the Kitchen / Laundry.

Built by Richard Bland Lee around 1801 - 1802. The thick stone walls would have helped keep milk cool.

This building is notable for the unusual "galleted" or "garneted" masonry. The small stones pressed into the mortar joints is seldom seen in North America.

1960 Historic American Buildings Survey drawings of the Dairy, identified as a "Patent House".

=== Schoolhouse ===
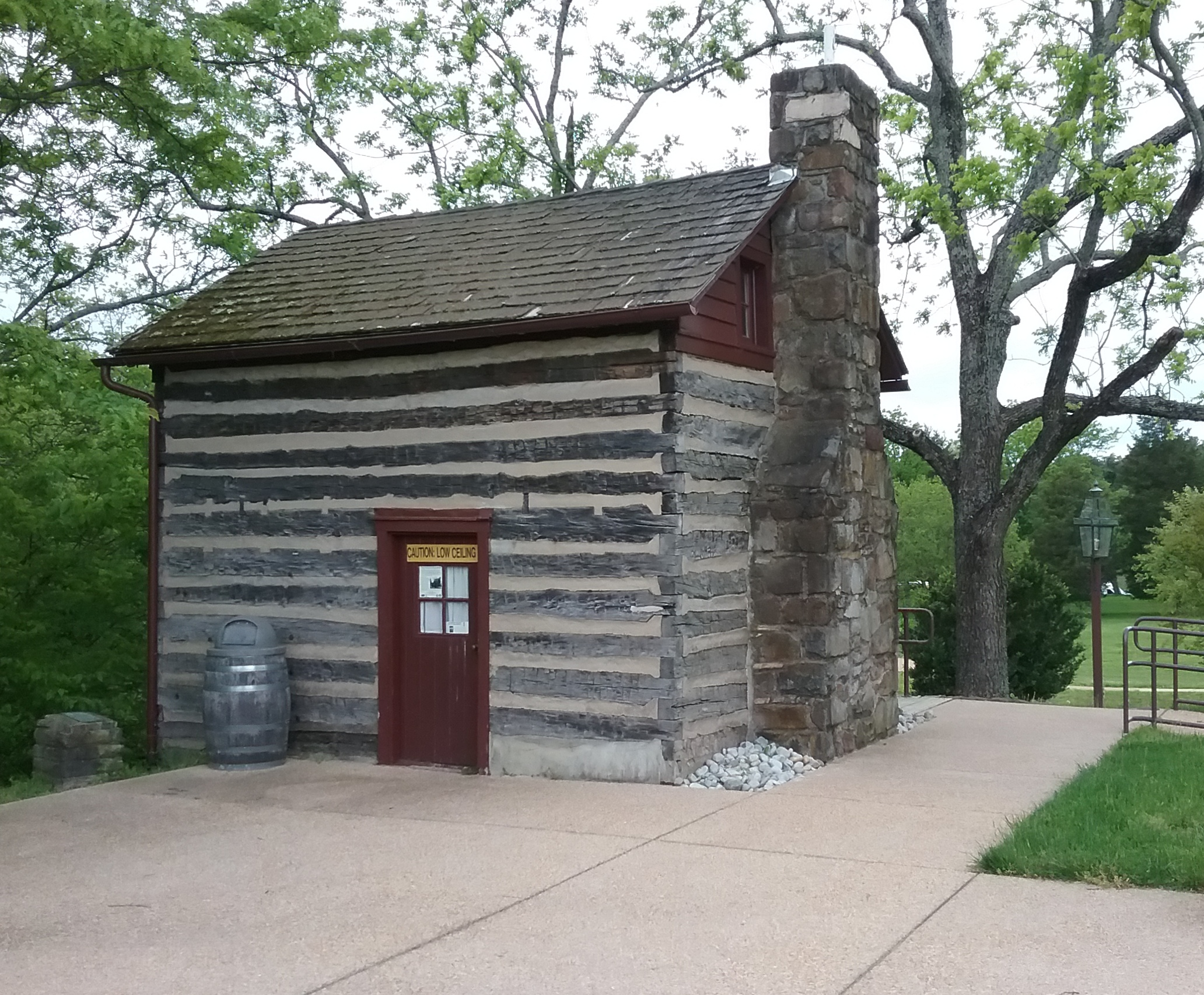

This log schoolhouse was originally from Antioch Farm, in Haymarket, Virginia. It was moved to Sully Historic Site in 1963, for preservation.

=== Slave Cabin ===

This replica of an enslaved worker's cabin was built in 2001. Location and construction details were based on historical records and archeological data.
