= Charles Lee (attorney general) =

American lawyer and politician (1758–1813)

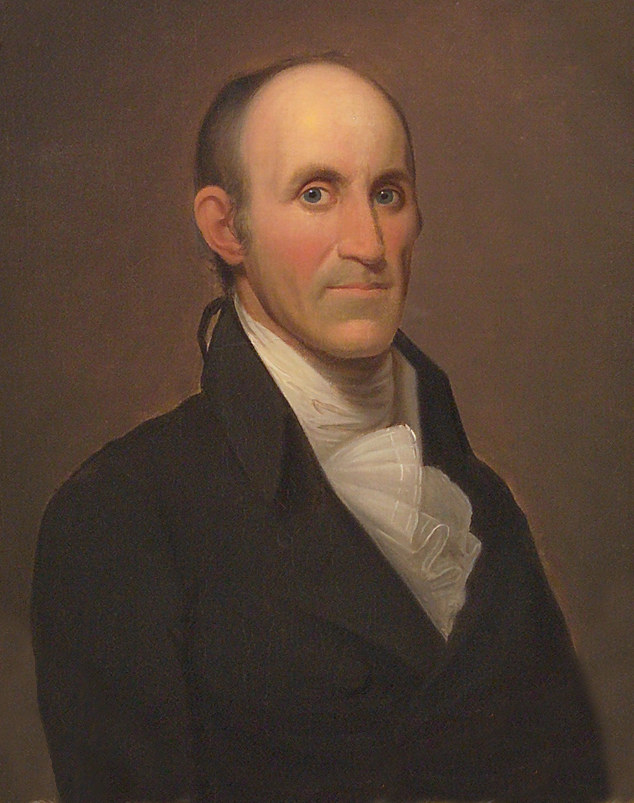

3rd United States Attorney General
- In office December 10, 1795 – March 4, 1801
- President: George Washington; John Adams
- Preceded by: William Bradford
- Succeeded by: Levi Lincoln

Acting United States Secretary of State
- In office May 13, 1800 – June 5, 1800
- President: John Adams
- Preceded by: Timothy Pickering
- Succeeded by: John Marshall

Member of the Virginia House of Delegates from Fairfax County
- In office October 21, 1793 – November 7, 1796 Serving with Samuel Arell, Elisha C. Dick
- Preceded by: Charles Simms
- Succeeded by: Charles Simms

Personal details
- Born: January 1, 1758 Leesylvania, Virginia, British America
- Died: June 24, 1815 (aged 57) Fauquier County, Virginia, U.S.
- Party: Federalist
- Spouse(s): Anne Lee (m. 1789; died 1804) Margaret Scott Peyton (m. 1809)
- Children: 6
- Education: Princeton University (BA)

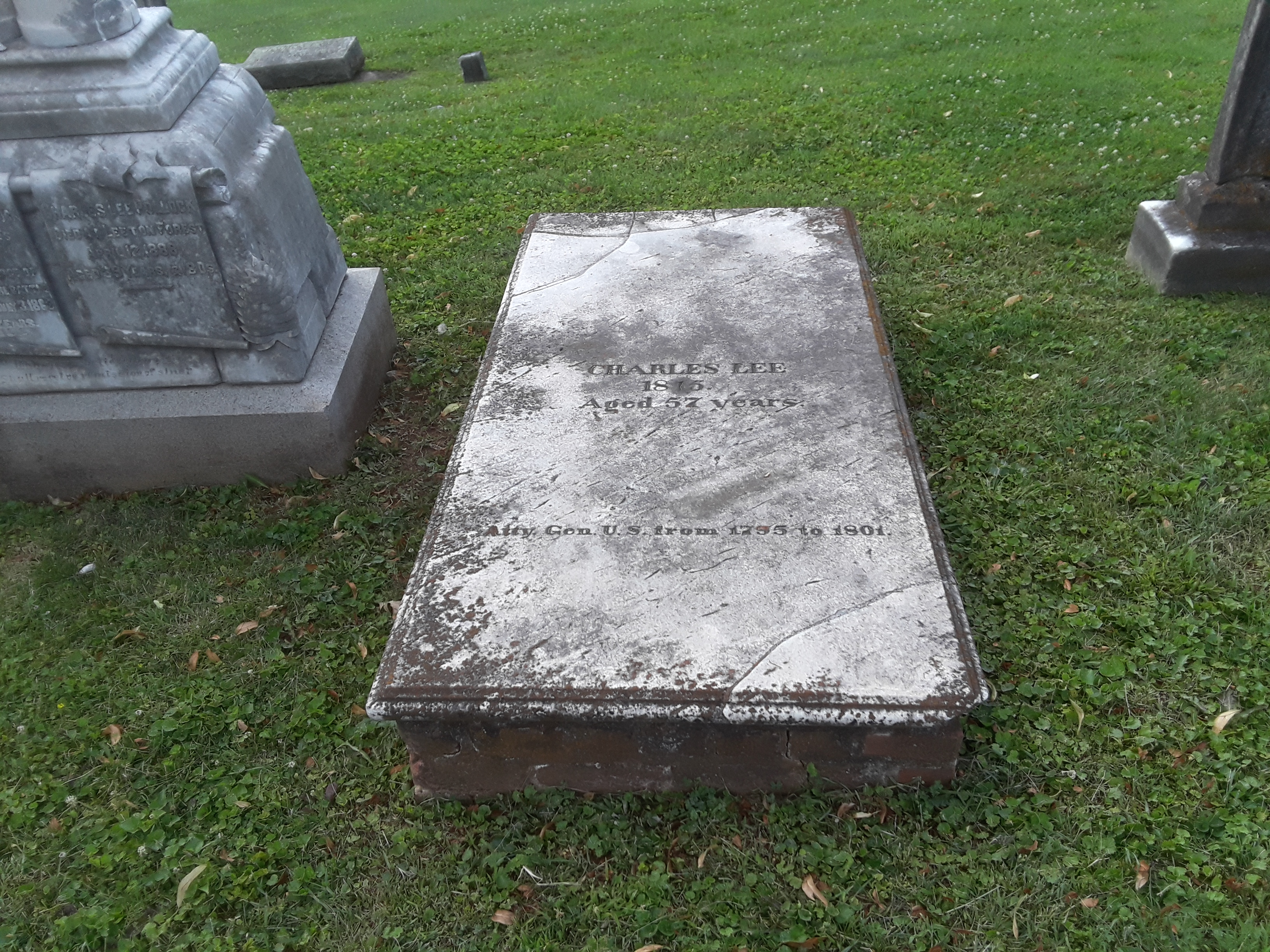
Lee's grave in the Warrenton Cemetery

Charles Lee (January 1, 1758 – June 24, 1815) was an American lawyer and politician from Virginia who served as United States Attorney General from 1795 until 1801, and as United States Secretary of State ad interim from May 13, 1800, to June 5, 1800, after serving as prosecutor for the City of Alexandria and serving in the Virginia House of Delegates from Fairfax County. He was a member of the Lee Family of Virginia.

== Early and family life ==
Lee Family Coat of Arms

Charles was the third of eleven children born to Henry (1730–1787) and Lucy (Grymes) Lee on his father's Leesylvania plantation in Prince William County, Virginia. A member of the First Families of Virginia, his elder brother became General Henry "Light-Horse Harry" Lee. Another lawyer brother became Congressman Richard Bland Lee, and future President Zachary Taylor would be his third cousin. This Lee also handled legal affairs for more distant relatives, including administering the will of Richard Henry Lee, one of whose sons/heirs Ludwell Lee also practiced law in Alexandria.

Lee received a private education suitable to his class, then traveled to Princeton, New Jersey, for studies at the College of New Jersey (later Princeton University) in 1775. Lee then read law with Jared Ingersoll in Philadelphia before returning to Virginia.

His father's 1787 will appointed Charles as Executor and the guardian of his three siblings under 21 years of age (Edmund, Lucy, Ann). Upon his mother's death in 1792, Charles received the Leesylvania plantation.

In 1789, Charles married Anne Lee (December 1, 1770 – September 9, 1804), his second cousin and the daughter of Richard Henry Lee (his first cousin once removed), and they lived at 220 N. Washington Street in Alexandria until 1800, then 407 N. Washington Street until her death (though Charles Lee continued to live there with his brother Edmund and his wife (Anne's sister Sara) until a year after his remarriage). The couple had six children: Anne Lucinda Lee (1790–1835), infant son (Arthur) Lee (1791–1791), Richard Henry Lee (February–March 1793), Charles Henry Lee (b. October 1794), William Arthur Lee (September 1796 – 1817), and Alfred Lee (1799–1865). In July 1809, Lee remarried, to Margaret Scott Peyton of Fauquier County (1783–1843). Lee had sold property in Alexandria shortly before that marriage, then sold several lots in Warrenton (the Fauquier County seat) and leased a two-story brick house on Prince Street in Alexandria. Charles and Margaret Lee had four children: Robert Eden Lee (1810–1843), Elizabeth Gordon Lee (1813–1892), Willis Drury Lee (d.1843), and Alexander Lee (1815–1815).

== Career ==
After admission to the Virginia bar, Lee practiced law in Alexandria (for much of this time part of the District of Columbia), as did his brothers Richard Bland Lee and Edmund J. Lee, his uncle Arthur Lee (at least technically), and cousin/brother-in-law Ludwell Lee. In addition to his government duties described below Lee had a private legal practice, and one of his clients was George Washington (from 1785 until his appointment as Attorney General as described below in 1795). He also was the Alexandria city prosecutor until resigning that office in 1794, and a local judicial position in 1801. Like his uncle squire Richard Lee, Charles Lee also held appointed positions as (most lucratively) tax collector for the Port of Alexandria (1789–1793), naval officer for the South Potomac (1777–1789), secretary of the Potomac Company (1785), and clerk for the Common Council of Alexandria (1785).

Fairfax County voters thrice elected Lee and Samuel Arell as their two delegates in the Virginia House of Delegates—in 1793, 1794 and 1795 (though Arell died in that final and was replaced by Elisha C. Dick, and both were replaced by Charles Simms and Augustine J. Smith in 1796).

President George Washington appointed Lee the Attorney General after William Bradford died in office. After Senate approval, Lee took office on December 10, 1795, and served until Washington left office. His successor, President John Adams continued Lee in that position for nearly the entire Adams administration (until February 19, 1801). On February 18, 1801, Adams nominated Lee for one of 16 new circuit court judgeships created by the Judiciary Act of 1801 (a judicial reorganization that also reduced the U.S. Supreme Court to five judges and temporarily eliminated circuit riding for justices). Although the Senate confirmed his appointment on March 3, 1801 (along with the "midnight judges" President Adams appointed as his administration ended), that judicial reorganization act was repealed on April 8, 1802 (by the Judiciary Act of 1802).

Both before and during his federal service, Lee lived in Alexandria, which was then part of the capital district. He was elected to the Alexandria City Council in 1794 and re-elected. He advocated returning the southern part of the District of Columbia to Virginia, which finally happened in 1847. In 1804 fellow councilors elected Lee as Alexandria's mayor, but he refused to serve, so Dr. Elisha C. Dick was selected instead. The previous year, his brother Edmund J. Lee had served as the council's recorder, and would first be elected to represent the third ward in 1805, later became the council's president (in 1810) and mayor (in 1815). Lee had inherited Leesylvania plantation from his father, although his mother Lucy was entitled to live there for the rest of her life (which ended in 1792), but to ease financial problems (probably related to investments of or with his brother Light-Horse Harry Lee), Charles Lee mortgaged it to his cousin William Lee, and the residence burned down, so eventually the acreage was also sold.

After his time as Attorney General, in addition to becoming among the most prominent trial lawyers in Northern Virginia and the District of Columbia, Lee became the port officer for the District of the Potomac. As a private attorney Lee represented William Marbury and other "midnight judge" appointees of President Adams in Marbury v. Madison, the landmark case against the Jefferson administration for unfulfilled political appointments. Simultaneously, Lee defended Hugh Stuart in Stuart v. Laird. Lee also defended former vice president Aaron Burr in his famous treason trial.

Most members of the Lee family operated plantations using enslaved labor. Charles Lee owned two slaves in Alexandria in 1787, and either he or a man of the same common name owned slaves in several Tidewater Virginia counties where his ancestors had plantations.

== Death and legacy ==
Charles Lee died on June 24, 1815, in Fauquier County, Virginia, at the age of 57, and is buried in the Warrenton Cemetery in Warrenton.

Legal offices
Preceded by William Bradford	United States Attorney General; 1795–1801	Succeeded by Levi Lincoln
