= Henry Lee II =

American politician (1730–1787)

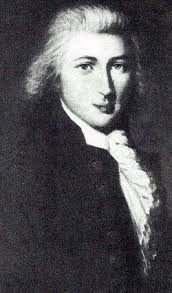
- Possible portrait of Col. Lee

Member of the Virginia Senate from Fairfax and Prince William Counties

Colonel
- In office October 7, 1776 – 1787
- Preceded by: position established
- Succeeded by: John Pope

Member of the House of Burgesses from Prince William County
- In office 1758–1775 Serving with John Baylis, Foushee Tebbs, Thomas Blackburn
- Preceded by: Henry Peyton
- Succeeded by: position abolished

Personal details
- Born: 1730
- Died: 1787 (aged 56–57)
- Resting place: Leesylvania
- Spouse: Lucy Grymes
- Children: 8 (including Henry Lee III, Charles Lee, Richard Bland Lee I, and Edmund Jennings Lee I)
- Parent(s): Henry Lee I Mary Bland
- Occupation: Planter, Soldier, Politician

Lee Family Coat of Arms

Col. Henry Lee II (1730–1787) was an American planter, military officer and politician from Westmoreland and later of Prince William County. Although he served in the Virginia General Assembly for three decades (part-time before and after the American Revolutionary War), and also held local military and political offices, Lee may today be best known for Leesylvania plantation (now a Virginia State Park and on the National Register of Historic Places), having been overshadowed by his cousin Richard Henry Lee and his sons, especially his lawyer sons Charles, Edmund Jennings Lee I and Richard Bland Lee I and his somewhat scandal-plagued firstborn son Henry "Light-Horse Harry" Lee III (father of Robert E. Lee).

== Early life ==
Lee was born in 1729 at Lee Hall in Westmoreland County, Virginia, the third son of Capt. Henry Lee I (1691–1747), of the Lee Family of Virginia, and his wife, Mary Bland (1704–1764). His mother was the daughter of Hon. Richard Bland, Sr. (1665–1720) and his second wife, Elizabeth Randolph (1685–1719). Thus, both parents descended from the First Families of Virginia who operated plantations using enslaved labor, as well as held important political and governmental offices. Lee received a private education appropriate to his class. As the third son (with elder brothers John (b. 1724) and Richard (b. 1729) and a sister Letitia (b. 1730), Lee was not expected to inherit the main plantation, but studied law and was admitted to the local bar in Westmoreland County, where he practiced law for three years.

== Career ==
In 1754, a year after his advantageous marriage described below, Lee moved to Prince Willliam County, developing a 2000 acre plantation on the Potomac River at Freestone Point between Neabsco Creek and Powell Creek near the town of Dumfries, which is now a state park but still known as "Leesylvania". That land much earlier been inherited by Laetitia Corbin, who had married Richard Lee II long before Virginia legislators had created Prince William County, and was known for magnificent views of the Potomac River. Henry Lee later inherited nearly 3500 acres in Fairfax County from his parents, as well as twenty enslaved people and considerable livestock. In 1787, the year of his death (and also the year of a Virginia tax census in Prince William County), Lee owned 29 enslaved teenagers under 16 years old, 26 enslaved adults, as well as 16 horses and 72 cattle and a 4-wheeled carriage.

Meanwhile, Henry Lee II used his legal training as a justice of the peace for Prince William county, and later led the county's justices who jointly administered the county in that era. Lee also led the county militia as County Lieutenant for Prince William, including during the Revolution, although that position in that era customarily involved gathering men and supplies, not leading troops outside the county.

In 1756, Lee thought he won election to the Virginia House of Burgesses, but a court declared the results invalid and Henry Peyton, likewise of the First Families of Virginia won the new election and was thus seated alongside John Bell for what proved to be a two-year long session. Lee clearly won a seat in 1758 (which proved to be a four year long session), and began serving alongside John Baylis. That year, five Lees (brothers and cousins, led by Richard Henry Lee of Westmoreland County) won election as burgesses from various counties in the Northern Neck of Virginia. Lee would continue to win re-elections and served alongside Foushee Tebbs until that man accepted a position as tobacco inspector and was succeeded by Thomas Blackburn until Governor Dumnore prorogued (suspended the assembly in 1775). Prince William County voters then elected Lee and Blackburn their representatives to the first four Virginia Revolutionary Conventions, and elected Lee and Cuthbert Bullitt as their representatives to the last revolutionary convention in 1776. After independence, Lee won election to the Virginia Senate, representing a district consisting of Fairfax and Prince William Counties, and continued to serve until his death, when John Pope won election to the vacant seat.

== Family and marriage ==
Henry Lee was the third son of Capt. Henry Lee I (1691–1747) of "Lee Hall", Westmoreland County, and his wife, Mary Bland (1704–1764). Bland was the daughter of Hon. Richard Bland (1665–1720) and his second wife, Elizabeth Randolph (1685–1719) (the daughter of William Randolph). Thus, all were descended from the First Families of Virginia.

Lee married on December 1, 1753 local beauty and heiress Lucy Grymes (April 26, 1734 – 1792), called Lowland Beauty, daughter of Hon. Charles Grymes (1693–1743) (twice related to President George Washington) and Frances Jennings (great-aunt of Edmund Randolph). Her father Charles Grymes lived at his "Morattico" plantation, in Richmond County, Virginia. His mother in law Frances Jenings was also of distinguished lineage, daughter of Edmund Jenings and wife Frances Corbin. Charles Grymes held local public offices including as sheriff of Richmond County, and held the highest office obtainable to a Virginia planter, as a member of the Governor's Council (1724-1725). Lucy survived a poisoning attempt by two local slaves in 1767 (one living at Leesylvania and the other working at the Neabsco foundry owned by Col. John Tayloe, father-in-law to his cousin Francis Lee). Henry reportedly wrote to his cousin Squire Lee complaining about the attempts of the irnworks' foreman to get the ringleader pardoned.

=== Children ===
All of Henry Lee II and Lucy Grymes Lee's children were born at Leesylvania:

1. Maj. Gen. Henry Lee III "Light Horse Harry" (1756–1818), Governor of Virginia. Lee III married:
  1. Matilda Lee (1766–1790), daughter of Hon. Philip Ludwell Lee, Sr., Esq. (1727–1775) and Elizabeth Steptoe (1743–1789), who married secondly, Philip Richard Fendall I, Esq. (1734–1805).
  2. Anne Hill Carter (1773–1829), daughter of Hon. Charles Carter, Sr. (1737–1802) of "Shirley", and his second wife, Anne Butler Moore (1756). Their son was Confederate General Robert E. Lee.
2. Hon. Charles Lee (1758–1815), U.S. Attorney General. Charles married:
  1. Anne Lee (1770–1804), daughter of Richard Henry Lee (1732–1794) and his second wife, Anne (Gaskins) Pinckard.
  2. Margaret Christian (Scott) Peyton (1783–1843), widow of Yelverton Peyton (1771–1802). Margaret was the daughter of Rev. John Scott (1747–1785) and Elizabeth Gordon .
3. Richard Bland Lee I (1761–1827) of "Sully plantation", who married Elizabeth "Eliza" Collins (1768–1858), daughter of Stephen Collins and Mary Parish.
4. Mary "Mollie" Lee (1764–1827), who married Philip Richard Fendall I, Esq. (1734–1805), his third wife. Philip was the son of Benjamin Fendall, Esq. (1708–1764) and his first wife, Eleanor Lee (1710–1759).
5. Theodorick Lee (1766–1849) of "Eckington", who married Catherine Hite (1766–1849).
6. Edmund Jennings Lee I (1772–1843), who married Sally Lee (1775–1837), daughter of Richard Henry Lee (1732–1794) and Anne (Gaskins) Pinckard.
7. Lucy Lee (1774), who never married.
8. Anne Lee (1776–1857), who married William Byrd Page, Sr. (1768–1812), son of Mann Page (1742–1787) and Mary Mason Selden (1754–1787).

== Death and legacy ==
Henry Lee died in 1787 at Leesylvania, and is buried there, as is his widow Lucy, who survived him by five years. He named his second son, Charles Lee, as administrator of his estate, because of scandals which had already developed around debts incurred by his eldest son, Henry Lee III, and his mishandling of the funds held in trust for his wife and daughters.

The plantation home burned in 1790, three years after Lee's death, and in the 1950s the remaining foundation was nearly completely demolished in construction of a road to the dock of a gambling boat, the SS Freestone. Henry Fairfax bought the property in 1825 from Alfred Lee, and his family lived there in a home which may have pre-dated the final Lee residence, and also operated a lucrative fishery on the Potomac River. However, the Fairfax home burned in 1910, and ruins of the walls and a chimney and barn foundation are all that remain. Increasing pollution in the Potomac ended the profitable fishery and a duck hunting club which acquired the property in the early 20th century. In modern times, the Lee Society of Virginia erected a monument to his son "Lighthorse Harry", which also mentions Leesylvania and honors it as the ancestral home of Robert E. Lee.
