= Henry Lee I =

Virginia politician (1691–1747)

- Lee Family Coat of Arms
- Born: 1691
- Died: summer 1747
- Occupations: Planter, Soldier, Politician
- Title: Captain
- Spouse: Mary Bland
- Children: 7 (including Henry Lee II and Richard "Squire" Lee)
- Parent(s): Richard Lee II; Laetitia Corbin
- Relatives: Thomas Lee (brother); Henry Lee III (grandson); Robert E. Lee (great-grandson)

Capt. Henry Lee I (1691–1747) was a prominent Virginia colonist, planter, soldier and bureaucrat, although today he is known mostly for his Lee family connections below.

== Early life ==
The youngest son born to the former Laetitia Corbin (ca. 1657–1706) and her husband Col. Richard Lee II, "the Scholar" (1647–1715) was physically born at Machodoc plantation (Note: Some sources spell the name of the plantation as "Machotick".) (Note: Machotick/Machodoc was the name of a local native tribe.) in Westmoreland County. His merchant paternal grandfather, Col. Richard Lee I, "the Immigrant" (1618–1664) had patented and improved thousands of acres in what became the Northern Neck of Virginia as well as sat on the Governor's Council for the colony, as had his son (this boy's father) and as would his slightly older brother, Thomas Lee (1690–1750). His maternal grandfather Henry Corbin was similarly influential in commerce and politics, also part of what would later be called the First Families of Virginia. However, when their father died, his eldest brother, Richard Lee III(1679–1718) was in England immersed in financial troubles of the mercantile firm Corbin and Lee, and the next-eldest son Philip Lee (1681–1744) lived in Maryland where he operated plantations as well participated in local politics. Since their middle brother Dr. Francis Lee seemed disinclined toward both politics and commerce, in 1712 their father had begun grooming Thomas to handle the political and financial end of the family business. Meanwhile, Henry received an education appropriate to his class, including when he was nine years old and Thomas ten, beginning studies at the College of William and Mary in Williamsburg.

== Career ==
Upon coming of age, Henry Lee inherited land in what became Prince William County (his son Henry Lee II would later develop some of this property as Leesylvania plantation.

Meanwhile, Richard Lee II had arranged with his political ally Governor Alexander Spottswood to have his son Thomas become his successor as the naval officer for the South Potomac district in 1712, then about a decade later (and after their father's death) Thomas would begin his political career as one of the Burgesses representing Westmoreland County. As that career progressed toward succeeding their late father on the Governor's Council, in 1730, Thomas Lee arranged for Henry to succeed him as the naval officer for the South Potomac district, a position that his son Richard "Squire" Lee would assume upon Henry's death. Although the position involved some military responsibility, because raiders from other nations were rare in the era after Queen Anne's War, the post was considered mostly as lucrative, since the holder earned a 10% fee based upon collection of a tax on tobacco being shipped out of the colony.

Meanwhile, Henry Lee operated the family's Machodoc plantation, 2,600 acres (11 km^{2}) acres originally developed by their grandfather, and by then mostly using enslaved labor rather than indentured servants. Machodoc had been inherited by their brother Richard, who soon died, and the brothers leased it from his England-based widow at a favorable rate. This agricultural activity became particularly important as Thomas became more involved in politics and spent time in England and Williamsburg as well as the Virginia colony's western reaches. Thomas Lee had also become agent for the Northern Neck Proprietary in 1711, upon the suggestion of Thomas Corbin and his ally Edmund Jenings, who had been the colony's attorney general before returning to England and reassumed that Virginia position in 1716. That agency incurred the wrath of the previous (and successor agent), the powerful "King" Carter who also sat on the Governor's Council. During this time, Thomas and Henry Lee also bought commercial sites upstream on the Potomac River, mostly within the Northern Neck proprietary.

Particularly after marrying as discussed below, Lee transferred his share of Machodoc to this brother and soon built and resided on an adjoining parcel he had inherited and a house he called Lee Hall (also near Hague, in Cople Parish, Westmoreland County). In 1729, the Machodoc house was destroyed in an arson fire set by disgruntled "Felons who Thomas [Lee], as Justice of the Peace, had condemned."

== Death ==
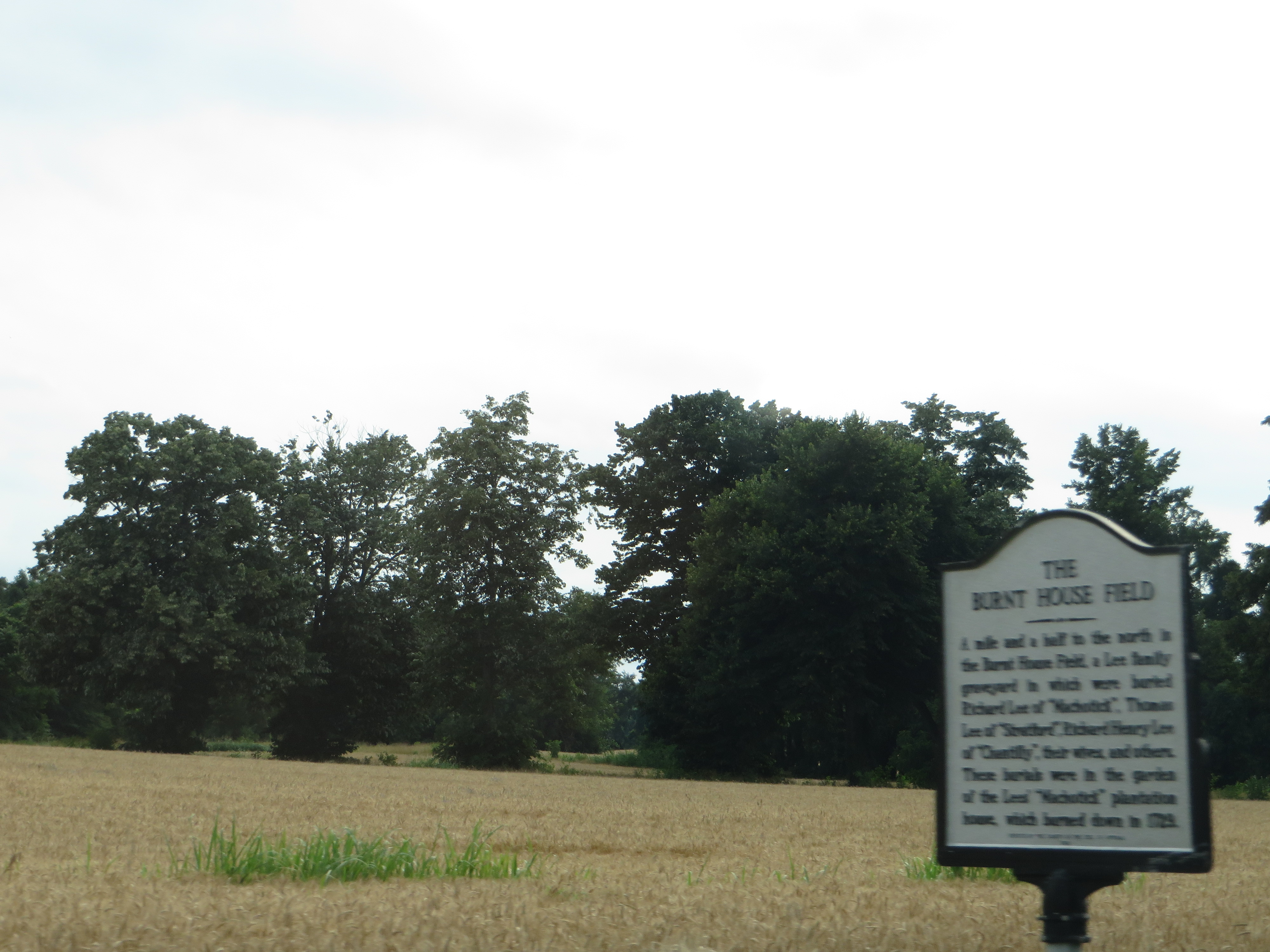

Henry died sometime in the summer of 1747 and is presumably buried in the Lee family cemetery known as the Burnt House Field.

== Personal life ==
Lee married Mary Bland (Prince William County, August 21, 1704–Westmoreland County, 1764), the daughter of Hon. Richard Bland Sr. (1665–1720) and wife Elizabeth Randolph (1685–1719). They had the following children:

1. ? Lee (ca. 1723).
2. John Lee (1724–1767), who married Mary (Smith) Ball (1725).
3. Richard "Squire" Lee (1726–1795), who married Sarah "Sally" Bland Poythress (1768–1828), daughter of Peter Poythress (1715–1785) of "Branchester", and Elizabeth Bland (1733–1792). Sally was the mother of Willoughby Newton, with her second husband of the same name.
4. ? Lee (ca. 1727).
5. Col. Henry Lee II (1730–1787) of "Leesylvania", who married Lucy Grymes (1734–1792) the "Lowland Beauty", daughter of burgess Charles Grymes (1693–1743) and Frances Jennings, daughter of Edmund Jenings.
6. Laetitia Lee (1730–1788), who married William Ball (ca. 1730).
7. Anne Lee (1732), who married William Fitzhugh Sr. (1730).

(According to some sources, Lee had four children with Mary Bland: John, Richard, Lettice/Letitia, and Henry.)
