= Henry Lee III =

American politician (1756–1818)

- Posthumous portrait by James Herring, (c. 1838), after an original 18th century painting

9th Governor of Virginia
- In office December 1, 1791 – December 1, 1794
- Preceded by: Beverley Randolph
- Succeeded by: Robert Brooke

Member of the U.S. House of Representatives from Virginia's 19th district
- In office March 4, 1799 – March 3, 1801
- Preceded by: Walter Jones
- Succeeded by: John Taliaferro

Delegate to the Confederation Congress from Virginia
- In office 1786–1788
- Preceded by: James Monroe

Personal details
- Born: January 29, 1756 Leesylvania near Dumfries, Prince William County, Virginia, British America
- Died: March 25, 1818 (aged 62) Cumberland Island, Georgia, U.S.
- Resting place: University Chapel
- Party: Federalist
- Spouses: Matilda Ludwell Lee (m. 1782; died 1790); Anne Hill Carter (m. 1793)
- Children: 9, including Henry IV, Sydney, and Robert
- Parent: Henry Lee II (father)
- Relatives: See Lee family
- Education: College of New Jersey
- Nickname: "Light-Horse Harry"

Military service
- Allegiance: United States
- Branch/service: Continental Army (CA); United States Army (USA)
- Years of service: 1776–1783 (CA); 1798–1800 (USA)
- Rank: Lieutenant colonel (CA); Major general (USA)
- Battles/wars: American Revolutionary War; Battle of Edgar's Lane; Battle of Paulus Hook; Battle of Summerfield; Battle of Haw River; Battle of Guilford Court House; Siege of Fort Watson; Siege of Ninety Six; Battle of Eutaw Springs; Siege of Yorktown; Whiskey Rebellion

Henry "Light-Horse Harry" Lee III (January 29, 1756 – March 25, 1818) was an early American patriot and politician who served as the ninth governor of Virginia and as the Virginia representative to the United States Congress. Lee's service during the American Revolution as a cavalry officer in the Continental Army earned him the nickname by which he is best known, "Light-Horse Harry". (Note: In the military parlance of the time, the term "Light-horse" had a hyphen between the two words "light" and "horse". See the title page of The Discipline of the Light-Horse. By Captain Hinde, of the Royal Regiment of Foresters, (Light-Dragoons.) published in London in 1778, a cavalry tactics classic which was used as a manual.) He was a member of the Lee Family of Virginia and the father of Confederate general Robert E. Lee.

== Early life and education ==
Lee was born on Leesylvania Plantation in Prince William County in the Colony of Virginia. He was the son of Col. Henry Lee II (1730–1787) of "Leesylvania" and Lucy Grymes (1734–1792). His father was the first cousin of Richard Henry Lee, twelfth President of the Continental Congress. His mother was an aunt of the wife of Virginia Governor Thomas Nelson Jr. His great-grandmother Mary Bland was also a grand aunt of President Thomas Jefferson. Lee was the grandson of Henry Lee I (1691–1747), a great-grandson of Richard Bland, and a great-great-grandson of William Randolph. He was also a descendant of Theodorick Bland of Westover and Governor Richard Bennett.

Lee graduated from the College of New Jersey (now Princeton University) in 1773 and began pursuing a legal career.

== Career ==
=== American Revolutionary War ===
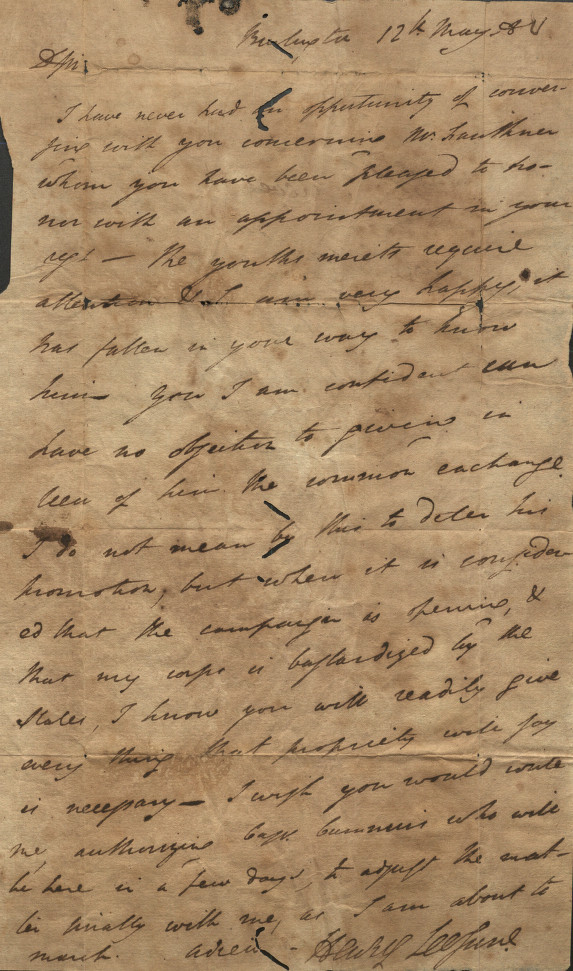
A May 12, 1780 letter from Lee to Israel Shreve

With the outbreak of the American Revolutionary War at the Battles of Lexington and Concord in 1775, Lee became a captain in a dragoon detachment in the Colony of Virginia, which was attached to the 1st Continental Light Dragoons.

In 1778, Lee was promoted to major and given the command of a mixed corps of cavalry and infantry known as Lee's Legion, with which he won a great reputation as a capable leader of light troops. At the time, highly mobile groups of light cavalry provided valuable service not only during major battles but also by conducting reconnaissance and surveillance, engaging the enemy during troop movements, disrupting the delivery of supplies, raiding and skirmishing, and organizing expeditions behind enemy lines; part of such tactics now are known as guerrilla warfare and maneuver warfare. In August, Lee led a detachment on a raid on a British fort, culminating in the Battle of Paulus Hook in New Jersey on August 19, in which 50 enemy soldiers were killed or wounded and 158 captured, while the Americans suffered two dead, three wounded and seven captured. (Despite his success, some of his fellow officers saw to it he was brought before a court martial on eight charges, over George Washington's disapproval; he was acquitted on all counts.) In September of the same year, Lee commanded a unit of dragoons which defeated a Hessian regiment at the Battle of Edgar's Lane.

During his time as commander of the Legion, Lee earned the moniker of "Light-Horse Harry" for his horsemanship. On September 22, 1779, the Continental Congress voted to present Lee with a gold medal, an honor given to no other officer below the rank of general, for the Legion's actions during the Battle of Paulus Hook.

Lee was promoted to lieutenant colonel and was assigned with his Legion to the southern theater of war. Lee's Legion attacked a British outpost at Georgetown, South Carolina alongside General Francis Marion in January 1781 and helped screen the British Army in its race to the Dan River the following month. Lee united with General Francis Marion and General Andrew Pickens in the spring of 1781 to capture several British outposts in South Carolina and Georgia, including Fort Watson, Fort Motte, Fort Granby, Fort Galphin, Fort Grierson, and Fort Cornwallis. Lee and his legion also served at the Battle of Guilford Court House, the Siege of Ninety-Six, and the Battle of Eutaw Springs. He was present at Charles Cornwallis's surrender at Yorktown but left the Army shortly after, claiming fatigue and disappointment with his treatment from fellow officers.

Colonel Lee was an Original Member of the Virginia Society of the Cincinnati.

=== Post-war career ===
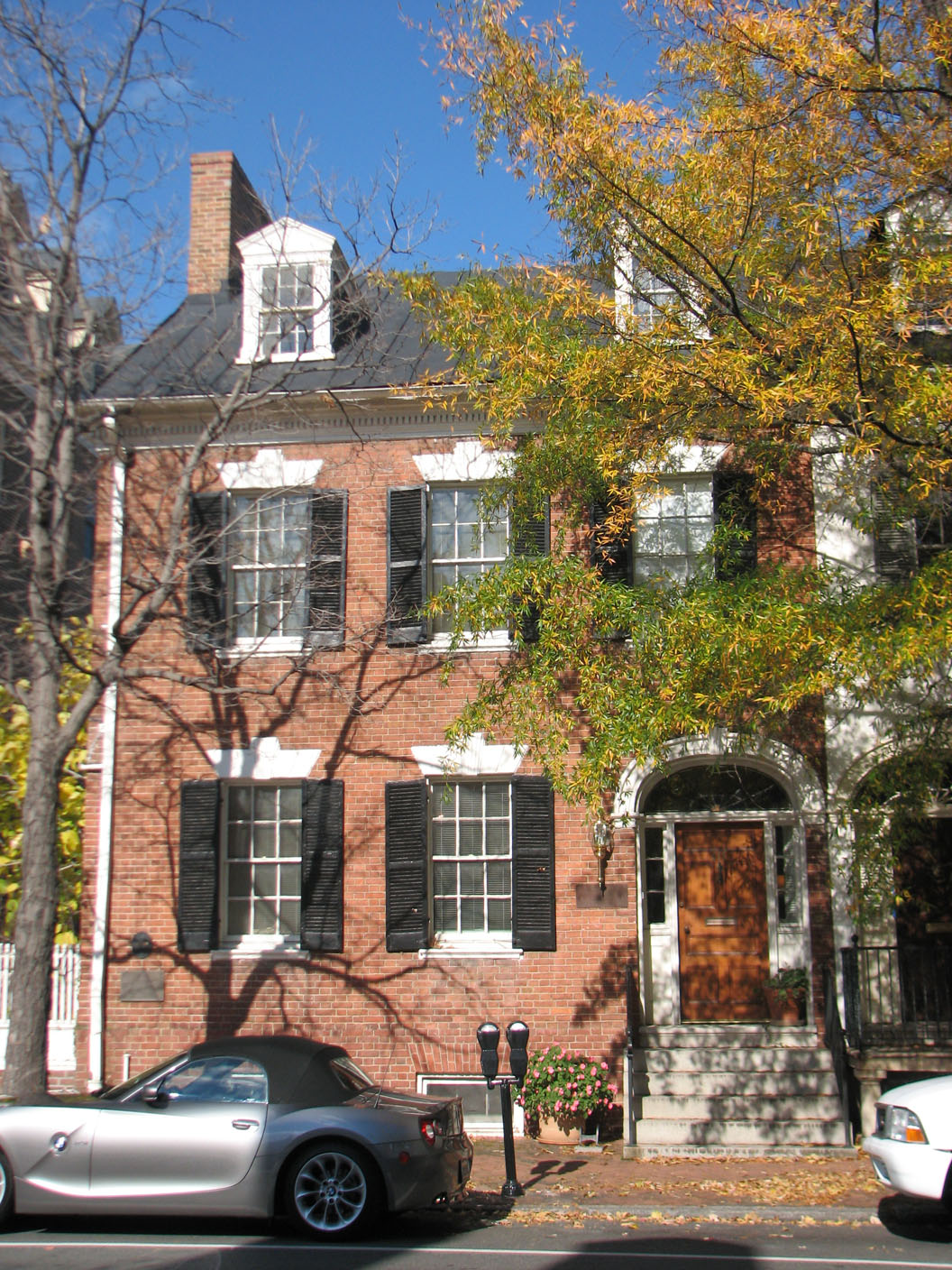
Lee's house in Alexandria, Virginia

From 1786 to 1788, Lee was a delegate to the Congress of the Confederation. In 1788, he served in the Virginia convention and supported ratifying the United States Constitution. From 1789 to 1791, he served in the Virginia General Assembly, and from 1791 to 1794, he was Governor of Virginia. A new county of Virginia was named after him during his governorship.

In 1794, President George Washington summoned Lee to suppress the Whiskey Rebellion in western Pennsylvania. Lee commanded the 12,950 militiamen sent to quash the rebels; there was no fighting because of a peaceful surrender. In 1798, in anticipation of a war with France, Henry Lee was appointed a major general in the U.S. Army.

At Washington's funeral on December 26, 1799, Lee famously eulogized him to a crowd of 4,000 as "first in war, first in peace, and first in the hearts of his countrymen."

From 1799 to 1801, he served in the United States House of Representatives as a member of the Federalist Party. After retiring from public service in 1801, he lived with his family at Stratford Hall and unsuccessfully tried to manage his plantation. The Panic of 1796–1797 and bankruptcy of Robert Morris reduced Lee's fortune.

In 1808, he was recommissioned by President Thomas Jefferson as major-general when war with Great Britain was imminent; Lee organized the Virginia militia. In 1809, he became bankrupt and served one year in debtors' prison in Montross, Virginia; his son, Robert Lee, was two years old at the time. After release, Lee moved his family to Alexandria, Virginia.

== Later life and death ==
He asked President James Madison for a commission at the onset of the War of 1812 but without success. In 1812 he published his Memoirs of the War in the Southern Department of the United States, where he summarized his military experiences during the Revolutionary War. During the civil unrest in Baltimore, Maryland in 1812, Lee received grave injuries while helping to resist an attack on his friend, Alexander Contee Hanson, editor of the Baltimore newspaper, The Federal Republican on July 27, 1812. Hanson was attacked by a Democratic-Republican mob because his paper opposed the War of 1812. Lee, Hanson, and two dozen other Federalists had taken refuge in the paper's offices. The group surrendered to Baltimore city officials the next day and were placed in the city jail for their own protection. Laborer George Woolslager led a mob that forced its way into the jail and removed the Federalists, beating and torturing them over the next three hours. All were severely injured; Lee's cheek was sliced open by a pocketknife, alongside attempts to gouge his eyes out, and one Federalist, James Lingan, died.

Lee suffered extensive internal injuries and head and face wounds, and even his speech was affected. His observed symptoms were consistent with what is now called post-traumatic stress disorder. After an unsuccessful recovery at home, he sailed to the West Indies to recuperate from his injuries. On his way back to Virginia, he died on March 25, 1818, at Dungeness, on Cumberland Island, Georgia, cared for by Nathanael Greene's daughter Louisa. "Light-Horse Harry" was buried with full military honors, provided by an American fleet stationed near St. Marys, Georgia, in a small cemetery at Dungeness. In 1913, his remains were moved to the Lee family crypt at University Chapel, on the campus of Washington & Lee University in Lexington, Virginia.

== Personal life and family ==
Between April 8 and 13, 1782, at Stratford Hall, Lee married his second cousin, Matilda Ludwell Lee (1764–1790), who was known as "the Divine Matilda". She was the daughter of Philip Ludwell Lee Sr. and Elizabeth Steptoe. Matilda had three children before she died in 1790:

- Philip Ludwell Lee (1784–1794)
- Lucy Grymes Lee (1786–1860)
- Henry Lee IV (May 28, 1787 – January 30, 1837) was a historian and author who also served as a speechwriter for both John C. Calhoun and presidential candidate Andrew Jackson, also helping the latter to write his inaugural address.

On June 18, 1793, Lee married the wealthy Anne Hill Carter (1773–1829) at Shirley Plantation. Anne was the daughter of Charles Carter, Esq., of Shirley, and his second wife Ann Butler Moore, daughter of Colonel Bernard Moore, Esq., of Chelsea, King William County, Virginia. According to William Winston Fontaine's research, Ann Butler Moore's paternal pedigree dates back to Sir Thomas More. Her mother, Ann Catherine Spotswood (1728 – c. 1802), was the daughter of Virginia Governor Alexander Spotswood, who was the great-grandson of John Spotswood and wife Rachel Lindsay; Rachel's ancestors were David Lindsay, 1st Earl of Crawford, and Elizabeth Stewart, daughter of King Robert II of Scotland. They had six children and were ancestors of Helen Keller:

- Algernon Sidney Lee (April 2, 1795 – August 9, 1796), died at Sully Plantation, buried there in an unmarked grave
- Charles Carter Lee (1798–1871)
- Anne Kinloch Lee (1800–1864)
- Sydney Smith Lee (1802–1869)
- Robert Edward Lee (January 19, 1807 – October 12, 1870), the fifth child of Henry and Anne, served as Confederate general-in-chief during the American Civil War.
- Mildred Lee (1811–1856)

== In popular culture ==
According to screenwriter Robert Rodat, the fictional character of Colonel Harry Burwell in the 2000 film The Patriot was inspired by the historical exploits of Henry Lee.

In the 1969 musical 1776, Lee's nickname is mentioned (anachronistically) during the song "The Lees of Old Virginia," sung by the character of his older cousin Richard Henry Lee.

Henry Lee III was a member of the Society of the Cincinnati in the State of Virginia.

== Works ==
- Lee, Henry, and Robert E. Lee. Memoirs of the War in the Southern Department of the United States. Eyewitness accounts of the American Revolution. Philadelphia: Bradford and Inskeep, 1812. (3rd ed. published in 1869, with a memoir by his son Robert E. Lee.)

== See also ==
- Lighthorse Harry Lee Cabin

== Sources ==
- Boyd, Thomas A. (1931). Light-Horse Harry Lee. New York: C. Scribner's Sons.
- Cecere, Michael (September 19, 2019). "The Court Martial of Major Henry Lee". Journal of the American Revolution.
- Dillon, John Forrest, ed. (1903). "Introduction". John Marshall. Vol. I. Chicago: Callaghan & Company. pp. liv–lv. ISBN 9780722291474.
- Gamble, Robert S. (1973). Sully: Biography of a House. Chantilly, Va.: Sully Foundation Ltd.
- Gilje, Paul A. (1980). "The Baltimore Riots of 1812 and the Breakdown of the Anglo-American Mob Tradition". Journal of Social History. 13 (4): 547–564. doi:10.1353/jsh/13.4.547. JSTOR 3787432.
- Haythornthwaite, Philip J.; Hook, Adam (2013). Napoleonic Light Cavalry Tactics. Botley, Oxford: Osprey Publishing.
- Hinde, Captain Robert (1778). Discipline of the Light-Horse. London: W.Owen.
- Hogeland, William (2006). The Whiskey Rebellion: George Washington, Alexander Hamilton, and the Frontier Rebels Who Challenged America's Newfound Sovereignty. New York: Scribner's. ISBN 978-1-4391-9329-7.

Political offices
Preceded by Beverley Randolph	Governor of Virginia; 1791–1794	Succeeded by Robert Brooke
U.S. House of Representatives
Preceded by Walter Jones	Member of the U.S. House of Representatives from Virginia's 19th congressional district March 4, 1799 – March 3, 1801 (obsolete district)	Succeeded by Edwin Gray
