= Charles Grymes =

Virginia colony tobacco planter (1693–1743)

Member of the House of Burgesses for Richmond County
- In office 1728–1734 Serving with John Tayloe, Daniel Hornby
- Preceded by: Charles Barber
- Succeeded by: J. Woodbridge

Personal details
- Born: October 10, 1693 Middlesex County, Colony of Virginia
- Died: December 1, 1743 (aged 50) Morrattico, Middlesex County, Virginia
- Occupation: planter, politician
- Known for: planter and burgess

Charles Grymes or Grimes (October 10, 1693 – December 1, 1743) was Virginia planter and politician who represented Richmond County on Virginia's Northern Neck in the House of Burgesses (1728–1734).

== Early life and education ==
Coat of Arms of John Grymes

The younger of two sons born to the former Alice Townley (1675–1710) of Gloucester County (granddaughter of burgess Augustine Warner) and her husband John Grymes (Grimesby, 1660–August 28, 1709). His grandfather, Rev. Charles Grymes (1612-1661) had emigrated from England to then-large Gloucester County, Virginia. He had an elder brother also John Grymes (1691–1749) and sisters Anne (1689–1730; who never married) and Elizabeth Lucy Grymes (1692–1750) who married John Holcomb, and whose son (also John Holcombe) would twice serve in the Virginia House of Delegates (representing first Prince Edward then Cumberland County). Their father built a plantation called "Grymesby" in Middlesex County. Their grandfather Rev. Chales Grymes (1612–1661) had emigrated from Kent, England to become rector of Hampton parish in York County in 1645, and had two sons and a daughter, as well as occasionally preached at what became North Farnham Parish in 1783 (previously Farnham parish of then-vast Rappahannock County. This boy received a private education appropriate to his class, and also attended the College of William and Mary in 1705. His brother John, who inherited Grymesby, would also represent Middlesex County in the House of Burgesses before being appointed to the Governor's Council.

Meanwhile, Charles Grymes married Frances Jenings, daughter of Edmund Jenings, a member of the Virginia Governor's Council. Two of their daughters married powerful planters. Frances Grymes would marry Philip Ludwell III, a merchant and planter who would sit in both houses of the Virginia General Assembly before moving to England. Her sister Lucy Grymes, called Lowland Beauty, married Henry Lee II, and Sarah Grymes (1738–1764) married John Reynolds.

== Career ==
Grymes ultimately inherited Morattico plantation in Richmond County, Virginia, as well as about 1000 acres at the headwaters of the Rappahanock River in what became Rappahannock County. Grymes became the Richmond County sheriff in 1724–1725. Richmond County voters elected him as one of their two representatives in the House of Burgesses in 1728, for the session that lasted until 1734, when they replaced both burgesses by J. Woodbridge and William Fantleroy.

== Death and legacy ==
Grymes died intestate in 1743 and his son in law Philip Ludlow was appointed as executor of his estate.
