= Cherry Hill, Prince William County, Virginia =

Cherry Hill
- Census-designated place (CDP)
- Location in Prince William County and the state of Virginia.
- Coordinates: 38°34′36″N 77°17′39″W
- Country: United States
- State: Virginia
- County: Prince William

Government
  - Type: None, multiple homeowners' associations

Area
  - Total: 7.8 sq mi (20 km^{2})
- Elevation: 45 ft (14 m)

Population (2020)
  - Total: 23,683
  - Density: 3,036/sq mi (1,172/km^{2})
- Demonym: Cherry Hiller
- Time zone: UTC−5 (Eastern (EST))
  - Summer (DST): UTC−4 (EDT)
- ZIP codes: 22026, 22191
- Area codes: 703, 571
- FIPS code: 51-15176
- GNIS feature ID: 2630624

Cherry Hill is a census-designated place (CDP) in Prince William County, Virginia, United States. The population was 16,000 according to the 2010 Census. As of the 2020 census, it was estimated to be 23,683. The CDP is made up of the Cherry Hill peninsula, to the northeast of the town of Dumfries.

== History ==
The eastern side of the peninsula was long occupied by low-density single-family homes, while the western side remained more industrial. This changed with the construction of Southbridge on the Potomac, a master-planned community of approximately 1,500 homes on 600 acres of land in southwestern Cherry Hill, founded in 1990 and built largely from the mid-1990s until the mid-2000s; River Oaks, a community consisting of 1,122 homes was built during the same time period just to the north of Southbridge on the Potomac.

The smaller community of Eagle Pointe was built in the late 2000s in western Cherry Hill, between U.S. Route 1 and Interstate 95, as were Port Potomac and the single-family house section of Powells Landing, located just across U.S. Route 1 from Eagle Pointe. The townhouse section of Powell's Landing was built in the mid-2010s.

Potomac Shores is a large community of both single-family homes and townhomes under construction by Beazer Homes USA, Drees Homes, PulteGroup, NVR, Inc., and Stanley Martin Homes on the previously low-density eastern side of the peninsula.

== Recreational and cultural activities ==
=== Parks and recreation ===
Cherry Hill is home to about 10 miles of trails (5 miles of which are in Potomac Shores), and several parks. These include neighborhood parks such as the Port Potomac Dog Park, the Powell's Landing Park, and the C. Lacey Compton Neighborhood Park, as well as Leesylvania State Park, located on the northeastern side of the peninsula.

The Canoe Club is home to a 100-foot pier for boat launches and fishing on the Potomac River.

Potomac Shores is the location of the new 30-acre Ali Krieger Sports Complex, featuring two artificial turf soccer fields, two grass soccer fields, a softball field, and a concessions building; two grass fields for soccer and lacrosse are under construction, along with a baseball diamond.

The Shores Club is a private social and recreational center for Potomac Shores residents, 13,000 square feet in total. The Fitness Barn has a modern gym, a yoga studio, and a competition pool. The Social Barn has a living room, a demonstration kitchen, a family pool, cabanas, a kids' pool, and a snack bar. Outside, there is also a community garden and a greenhouse, as well as a 9,400 square foot event lawn.

The Potomac Shores Golf Club is a large golf course with an 8,000 square foot clubhouse, featuring a pro shop and restaurant.

=== Cultural districts ===
Potomac Shores is unofficially subdivided into two cultural districts:

==== Marketplace District (Town Center) ====
The Marketplace District is a planned retail center, walkable and open into the night, with courtyards, tree-lined streets, and live music.

==== Waterfront District ====
The Waterfront District is oriented towards aquatic activities, with a planned marina, public and private boat moorings, trails, and a small boating and fishing supplies store.

== Transportation ==
Five major highways directly serve Cherry Hill: Interstate 95 and U.S. Route 1, which both provide access to Interstate 495, Interstate 395, inner suburbs such as Arlington and Alexandria, as well as Maryland and Washington itself in the north, exurban areas such as Fredericksburg, and the Southern East Coast in the south; River Heritage Boulevard, which connects the new developments on the eastern side of the peninsula with U.S. Route 1 in the west and is the main arterial road of Cherry Hill; Virginia State Route 234 (Prince William Parkway) which begins at U.S. Route 1 on the border between Dumfries and Cherry Hill, and continues west to Manassas, Manassas Park, and Interstate 66; and Cardinal Drive, which begins at U.S. Route 1 in northern Cherry Hill, connecting it with Interstate 95, then continuing to its western terminus at Minnieville Road in Dale City.

It was a stop on the Richmond, Fredericksburg and Potomac Railroad, which was replaced by CSXT. CSXT no longer has a stop in Cherry Hill, though it continues to use the same tracks.

Amtrak's Northeast Regional, Silver Meteor, Silver Star, Palmetto, Auto Train, and Carolinian all share right-of-way with CSXT and the Virginia Railway Express.

In 2013, when the construction of Potomac Shores was approved, it was announced that the Virginia Railway Express would add a station along its north-south Fredericksburg Line, planned to open in 2017. Previously, residents of Cherry Hill used the Rippon station approximately 3 miles (4.8 km) to the north. A construction contract is expected to be awarded by late 2021, and construction is supposed to take eighteen months, placing the grand opening in mid-2023.

Potomac and Rappahannock Transportation Commission's OmniRide operates five bus routes with stops in Cherry Hill: DF-L, from Dumfries to Potomac Mills, R1-L, from Dumfries to Woodbridge, R1-E, which begins in Cherry Hill and ends in Washington, D.C., MC-E, which begins in Cherry Hill and ends in the nearby CDP of Montclair, and RT1LOC, following Route 1 from Triangle to Woodbridge.

== Geography ==
Cherry Hill is located in southeastern Prince William County. It is bordered by Neabsco to the north, Dumfries and Triangle to the southwest, and Marine Corps Base Quantico to the southeast.

Per the United States Census Bureau, Cherry Hill has a total area of 7.8 square miles.

The CDP is home to a number of creeks draining into the Potomac River; from north to south: Neabsco Creek, which has its origins at three forks in Dale City, and is joined by Hoadly Run there, forms the northern border of Cherry Hill, draining into the Potomac; Powells Creek, originating in Independent Hill and flowing through central Cherry Hill; Dewey's Creek, originating in Montclair and forming Cherry Hill's border with Dumfries before draining into Quantico Creek; and Quantico Creek itself, which has its origins in the Prince William Forest Park, and after being joined by Dewey's Creek, forms the CDP's southern border.

== Climate ==
The climate in this area is characterized by hot, humid summers and generally mild to cool winters. According to the Köppen Climate Classification system, Cherry Hill has a humid subtropical climate, abbreviated "Cfa" on climate maps.

Climate data for Cherry Hill, Virginia, 1930–present
Month	Jan	Feb	Mar	Apr	May	Jun	Jul	Aug	Sep	Oct	Nov	Dec	Year
Record high °F (°C)	87 (30.6)	83 (28.3)	92 (33.3)	96 (35.6)	98 (36.7)	104 (40)	105 (40.6)	109 (42.8)	105 (40.6)	97 (36.1)	87 (30.6)	78 (25.6)	109 (42.8)
Average high °F (°C)	44.5 (6.9)	45.8 (7.7)	55.6 (13.1)	66.4 (19.1)	76 (24.4)	83.3 (28.5)	87.3 (30.7)	85.1 (29.5)	79.1 (26.2)	68.6 (20.3)	57.3 (14.1)	46 (7.8)	66.3 (19.1)
Average low °F (°C)	26.3 (-3.2)	26.6 (-3)	34.5 (1.4)	43.1 (6.2)	53 (11.7)	62.5 (16.9)	67.4 (19.7)	65.3 (18.5)	59 (15)	47.2 (8.4)	36.5 (2.5)	27.7 (-2.4)	45.7 (7.6)
Record low °F (°C)	-5 (-20.6)	-20 (-28.9)	6 (-14.4)	16 (-8.9)	28 (-2.2)	37 (2.8)	40 (4.4)	31 (-0.6)	33 (0.6)	20 (-6.7)	7 (-13.9)	-2 (-18.9)	-20 (-28.9)
Average precipitation inches (mm)	2.9 (74)	2.6 (66)	3.2 (82)	2.9 (73)	3.1 (80)	3.5 (88)	3.8 (97)	4.3 (109)	3.1 (78)	2.8 (70)	2.5 (63)	2.8 (72)	37.5 (952)
Average snowfall inches (cm)	3.5 (8.9)	4.1 (10.4)	2.4 (6.1)	0.2 (0.5)	0 (0)	0 (0)	0 (0)	0 (0)	0 (0)	0 (0)	0.7 (1.8)	3.2 (8.1)	14.1 (35.8)
Average precipitation days	10	8	10	9	10	10	9	9	7	6	8	8	103

== Government ==
Cherry Hill is a census-designated place within Prince William County; therefore, schools, roads, and law enforcement are provided by the county.

=== Homeowners' associations ===
Cherry Hill has no central government or central homeowners' association, and is instead home to several homeowners' associations, each of which has its own government. Typical homeowners' associations are headed by a board of directors elected by the members, with an elected president or Community Manager forming the executive branch and possibly employing an assistant.

=== Representation ===
Cherry Hill is entirely within Virginia's 11th congressional district, represented by Gerry Connolly (D-Mantua). In the state House of Delegates, the parts of Cherry Hill west of U.S. Route 1, such as the Eagle Pointe neighborhood, are represented by Luke Torian (D-Woodbridge), while the rest of Cherry Hill is represented by Candi King (D-Dumfries). The eastern part of Cherry Hill is represented in the State Senate by Jeremy McPike (D-Dale City), while the western part, including Potomac Shores, is represented by Scott Surovell (D-Fort Hunt).

== Local media ==
Cherry Hill lies within the distribution zone for two national newspapers, the Washington Post and the Washington Times, as well as for the local Prince William Times. The Potomac Local, an online news website covers all of Prince William County, and the Southbridge Sentinel covers eastern Prince William County. Cherry Hill is also covered by the Dale City and Woodbridge divisions of AOL's Patch service.

== Education ==
=== Primary and secondary schools ===
As a part of Prince William County, Cherry Hill is served by Prince William County Public Schools and private schools. Cherry Hill is served by Potomac High School in the CDP itself. Cherry Hill is divided between two middle schools: The newly built Potomac Shores Middle School, which serves the area south of Powell's Creek and the school complex on Panther Pride Drive, and Potomac Middle School, which serves the area to the north.

Potomac Shores is also home to a private high school, Saint John Paul the Great Catholic High School.

==== Public elementary schools ====
- Covington-Harper Elementary School
- John Pattie Elementary School
- Leesylvania Elementary School
- Mary Williams Elementary School
- River Oaks Elementary School
- Swans Creek Elementary School

=== Colleges and universities ===
Cherry Hill is near the Northern Virginia Community College - Woodbridge Campus.

=== Public libraries ===
Cherry Hill is near both the Dumfries Library and Potomac Library branches of the Prince William County Public Library System, in the neighboring communities of Dumfries and Neabsco, respectively.

== Demographics ==
Historical population
Census	Pop.	Note	%±
2010	16,000		—
2020	23,683		48.0%
U.S. Decennial Census; 2000 2010

Cherry Hill was first listed as a census designated place in the 2010 U.S. census.

=== Racial and ethnic composition ===
Cherry Hill CDP, Virginia – Racial and ethnic composition Note: the US Census treats Hispanic/Latino as an ethnic category. This table excludes Latinos from the racial categories and assigns them to a separate category. Hispanics/Latinos may be of any race.
Race / Ethnicity (NH = Non-Hispanic)	Pop 2010	Pop 2020	% 2010	% 2020
White alone (NH)	3,796	4,248	23.72%	17.94%
Black or African American alone (NH)	7,541	11,323	47.13%	47.81%
Native American or Alaska Native alone (NH)	32	39	0.20%	0.16%
Asian alone (NH)	1,296	2,271	8.10%	9.59%
Native Hawaiian or Pacific Islander alone (NH)	26	31	0.16%	0.13%
Other race alone (NH)	34	169	0.21%	0.71%
Mixed race or Multiracial (NH)	672	1,274	4.20%	5.38%
Hispanic or Latino (any race)	2,603	4,328	16.27%	18.27%
Total	16,000	23,683	100.00%	100.00%

=== 2020 census ===
As of the 2020 census, Cherry Hill has a median household income of $99,831, more than the state average median household income of $76,456, and 6,287 households out of a total of 7,991 housing units. The population of 23,683 people was spread out over 7.8 square miles, giving the CDP a population density of 3,036 people per square mile. The median age was 34, less than the Virginia median age of 38.5.

24.4% of Cherry Hill's population was foreign-born, above the Virginia average of 12.7%. The most common ancestry was Sub-Saharan African (13.8%), followed by Irish (3.9%) and English (3.6%).
