= Farnham (disambiguation) =

Farnham is a town in Surrey, England, within the Borough of Waverley.

Farnham may also refer to:

== Places ==
=== Canada ===
- Farnham, Quebec

=== United Kingdom ===
- Farnham, Dorset
- Farnham, Essex
- Farnham, Northumberland, now in Hepple
- Farnham, North Yorkshire
- Farnham, Suffolk
- Farnham, Surrey
  - Farnham Castle, Surrey
- Farnham Common, Buckinghamshire
- Farnham Royal, Buckinghamshire

=== United States ===
- Farnham, New York
- Farnham, Virginia
- Farnham Creek, a stream in Minnesota
- Farnham Lake, a lake in Minnesota

== People ==
- Farnham (surname)

== Fiction ==
- Farnham the Drunk, a character in the popular role playing game Diablo
- Hubert Farnham, the title character in the Robert A. Heinlein novel Farnham's Freehold
- Farnham's Legend, a science fiction novel, based on the X computer game series
- The Farnhams, a family in the British TV soap Brookside

== Other ==
- Baron Farnham, a title in the peerage of Ireland

== See also ==
- Farnam (disambiguation)
- Farnum (disambiguation)
