= Neabsco =

Neabsco may refer to:

- Neabsco Creek, a tributary of the Potomac River in Prince William County, Virginia, United States
- Neabsco Iron Works, a former iron foundry in Woodbridge, Virginia, United States
- Neabsco Road (SR 610), a road in Prince William County, Virginia, United States
- Leesylvania, Virginia, United States, a census-designated place formerly known as Neabsco
