= Leesylvania, Virginia =

- Census-designated place
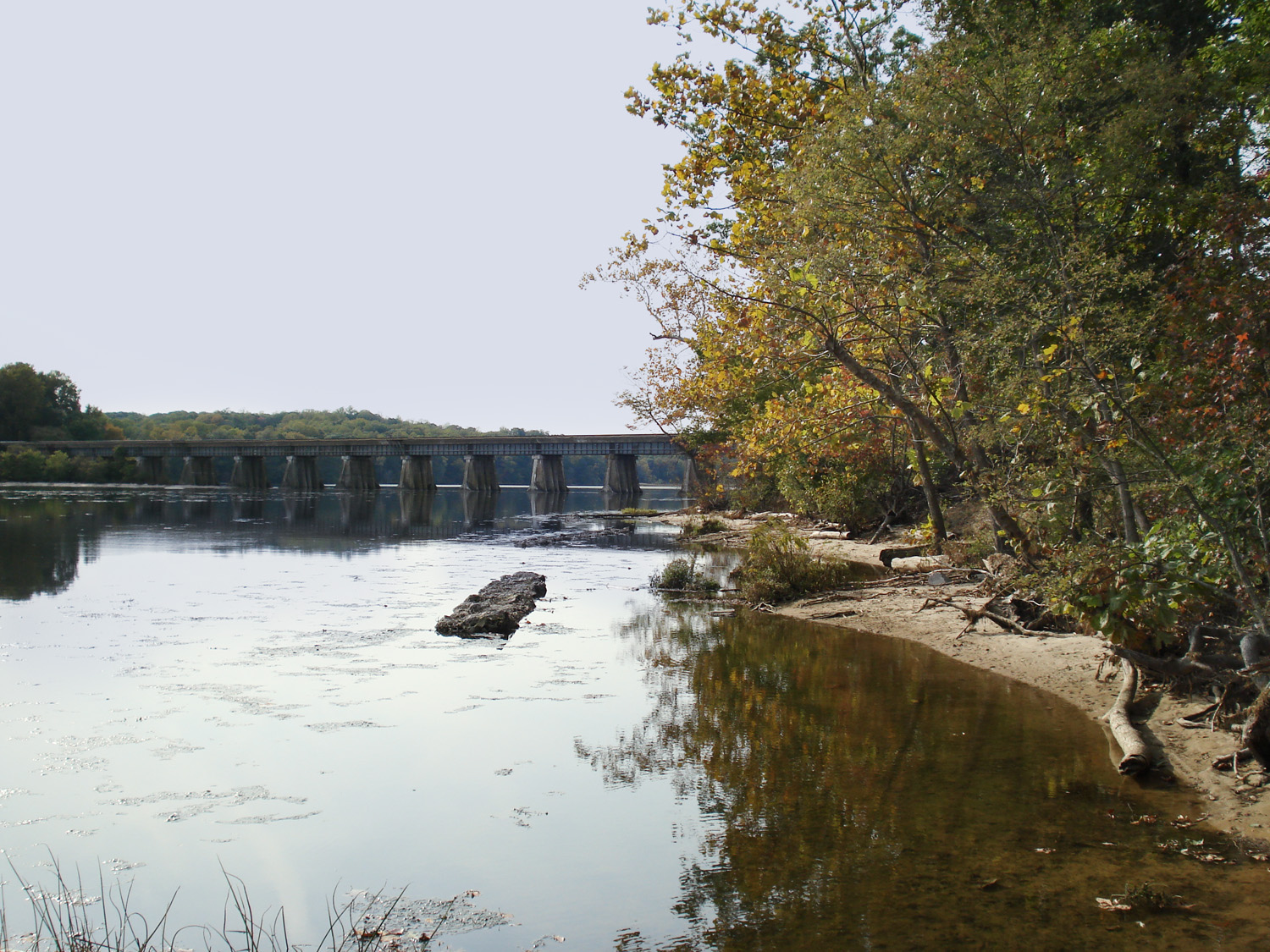
- The RF&P Subdivision crossing over Powells Creek at Leesylvania State Park

- Location in Prince William County and the state of Virginia.
- Coordinates: 38°36′28″N 77°16′51″W
- Country: United States
- State: Virginia
- County: Prince William
- Elevation: 13 ft (4.0 m)

Population (2020)
  - Total: 21,193
- Time zone: UTC−5 (Eastern (EST))
  - Summer (DST): UTC−4 (EDT)
- ZIP codes: 22191
- FIPS code: 51-55272
- GNIS feature ID: 2629768

Leesylvania, formerly known as Neabsco, is a census-designated place in Prince William County in the U.S. state of Virginia.

As of the 2020 census, Leesylvania had a population of 21,193.

== History ==
Leesylvania plantation is located nearby in Leesylvania State Park. During the 18th century, Henry Lee II, grandfather of Robert E. Lee, lived in the plantation house with his family and enslaved Africans, growing tobacco on the property. Due to road construction in the 1950s, little of the house's foundation remains.

The CDP was formed as Neabsco (named for Neabsco Creek) in 2000 in an area which was formerly the southern area of Woodbridge. In 2020, the CDP was renamed Leesylvania, after the nearby state park and plantation.

== Demographics ==
Historical population
Census	Pop.	Note	%±
2010	12,068		—
2020	21,193		75.6%
U.S. Decennial Census; 2010 2020

=== 2020 census ===
As of the 2020 census, Leesylvania had a population of 21,193. The median age was 35.4 years. 25.4% of residents were under the age of 18 and 6.9% of residents were 65 years of age or older. For every 100 females there were 91.3 males, and for every 100 females age 18 and over there were 86.7 males age 18 and over.

99.9% of residents lived in urban areas, while 0.1% lived in rural areas.

There were 7,419 households in Leesylvania, of which 39.0% had children under the age of 18 living in them. Of all households, 50.7% were married-couple households, 16.2% were households with a male householder and no spouse or partner present, and 27.8% were households with a female householder and no spouse or partner present. About 24.7% of all households were made up of individuals and 2.8% had someone living alone who was 65 years of age or older.

There were 7,649 housing units, of which 3.0% were vacant. The homeowner vacancy rate was 0.9% and the rental vacancy rate was 5.0%.

Racial composition as of the 2020 census
Race	Number	Percent
White	5,274	24.9%
Black or African American	8,620	40.7%
American Indian and Alaska Native	87	0.4%
Asian	2,921	13.8%
Native Hawaiian and Other Pacific Islander	33	0.2%
Some other race	1,573	7.4%
Two or more races	2,685	12.7%
Hispanic or Latino (of any race)	3,483	16.4%

=== 2010 census ===
The community was first listed as a census designated place under the name Neabsco in the 2010 U.S. census formed from part of Woodbridge CDP and additional area.

In the 2010 Census, Leesylvania, then named Neabsco, had a population of 12,068.

== Geography ==
Leesylvania is in southeastern Prince William County and is bordered to the northeast by Woodbridge, to the northwest by Dale City, to the west by Montclair, to the south by Cherry Hill, and to the east by Leesylvania State Park. The CDP lies at an elevation of 13 ft (4.0 m) above sea level.

The CDP is bisected by Neabsco Creek with Powells Creek passing through at the southern area, both of which flow west—east into the Potomac River near the state park.

== Transportation ==
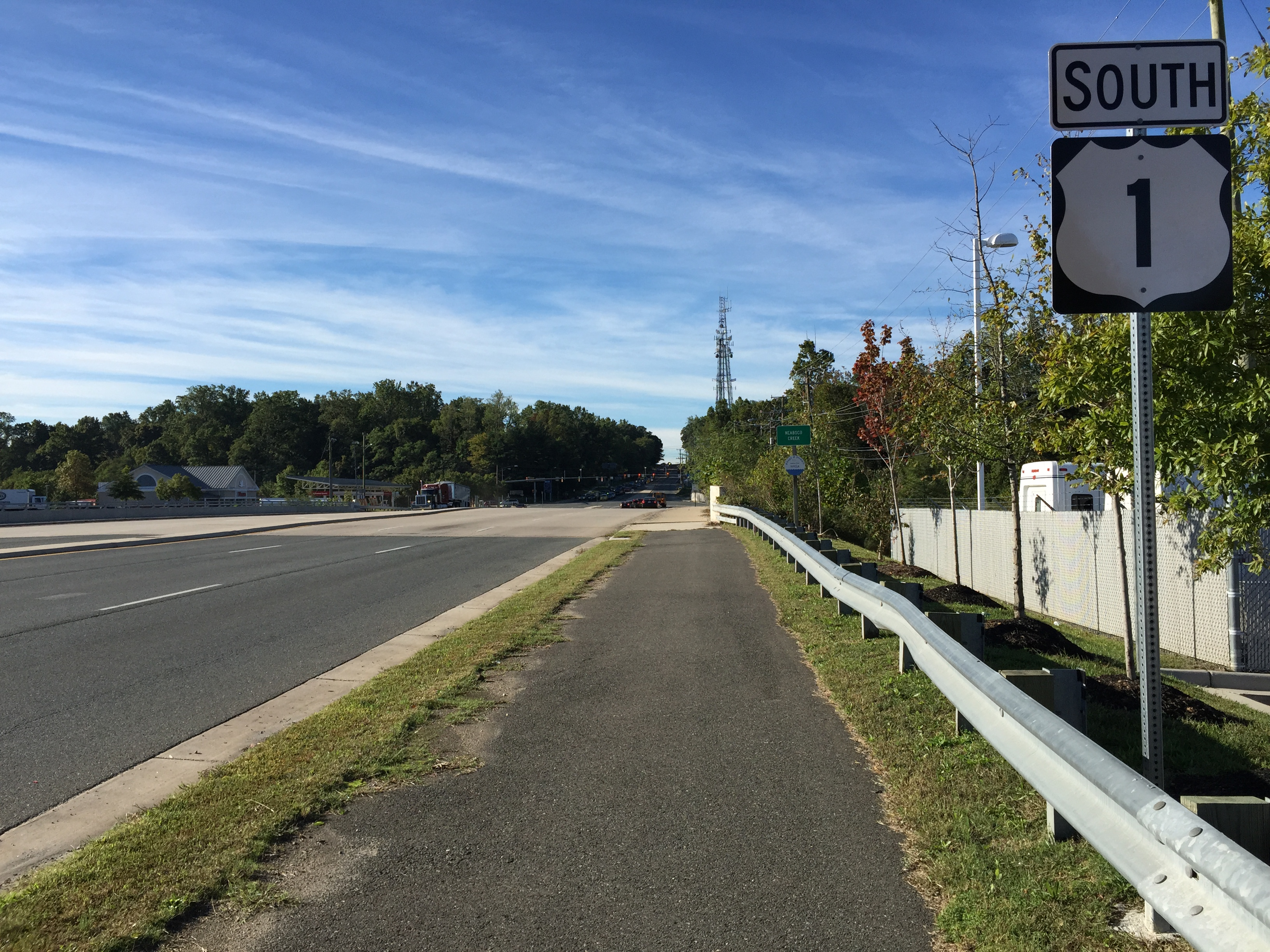
View south along U.S. 1 near Neabsco Creek

The central area of Leesylvania lies at the crossroads of U.S. Route 1 (Richmond Highway) and SR 610 (Cardinal Drive/Neabsco Road). The CDP is also served by SR 638 (Neabsco Mills Road/Blackburn Road), SR 784 (Dale Boulevard), and VA 394 (College Drive). Interstate 95 forms the western boundary of the CDP.

Virginia Railway Express service is provided at the nearby Rippon station, and the Potomac and Rappahannock Transportation Commission provides OmniRide bus service in Leesylvania.

== Education ==
Freedom High School and Northern Virginia Community College's Woodbridge campus are located in the CDP of Leesylvania.
