= Powells Creek (Potomac River tributary) =

Creek in Prince William County, Virginia, U.S.

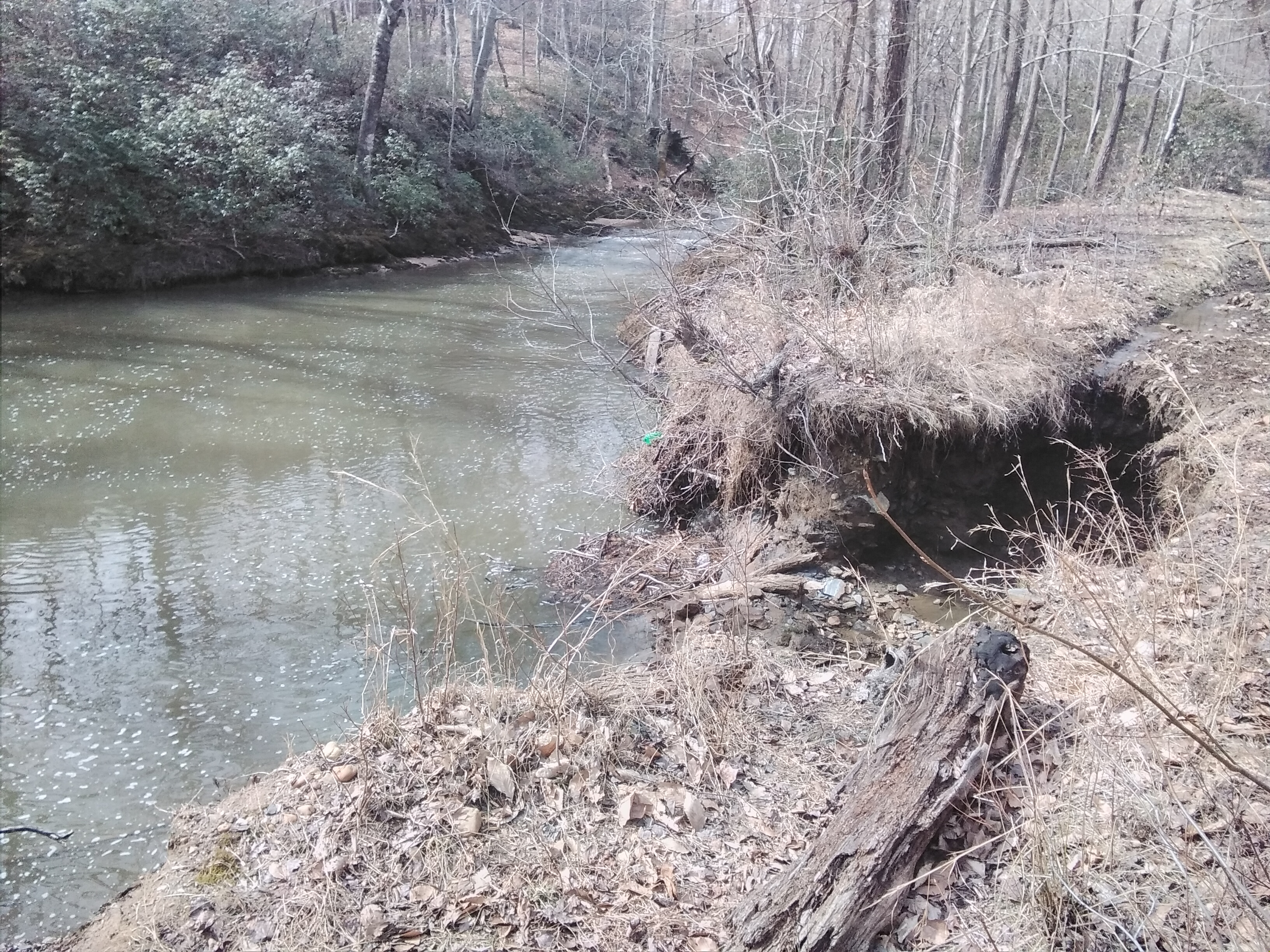
- Powells Creek in a forest near Eagles Pointe in Woodbridge

Location
- Country: United States
- State: Virginia
- County: Prince William County

Physical characteristics
- Mouth
  - location: Potomac River
  - coordinates: 38°35′02″N 77°15′52″W
  - elevation: 0 feet (0 m)

Powells Creek (also sometimes spelt Powell's Creek) is a tributary of the lower tidal segment of the Potomac River in eastern Prince William County, Virginia, United States.

== Course ==
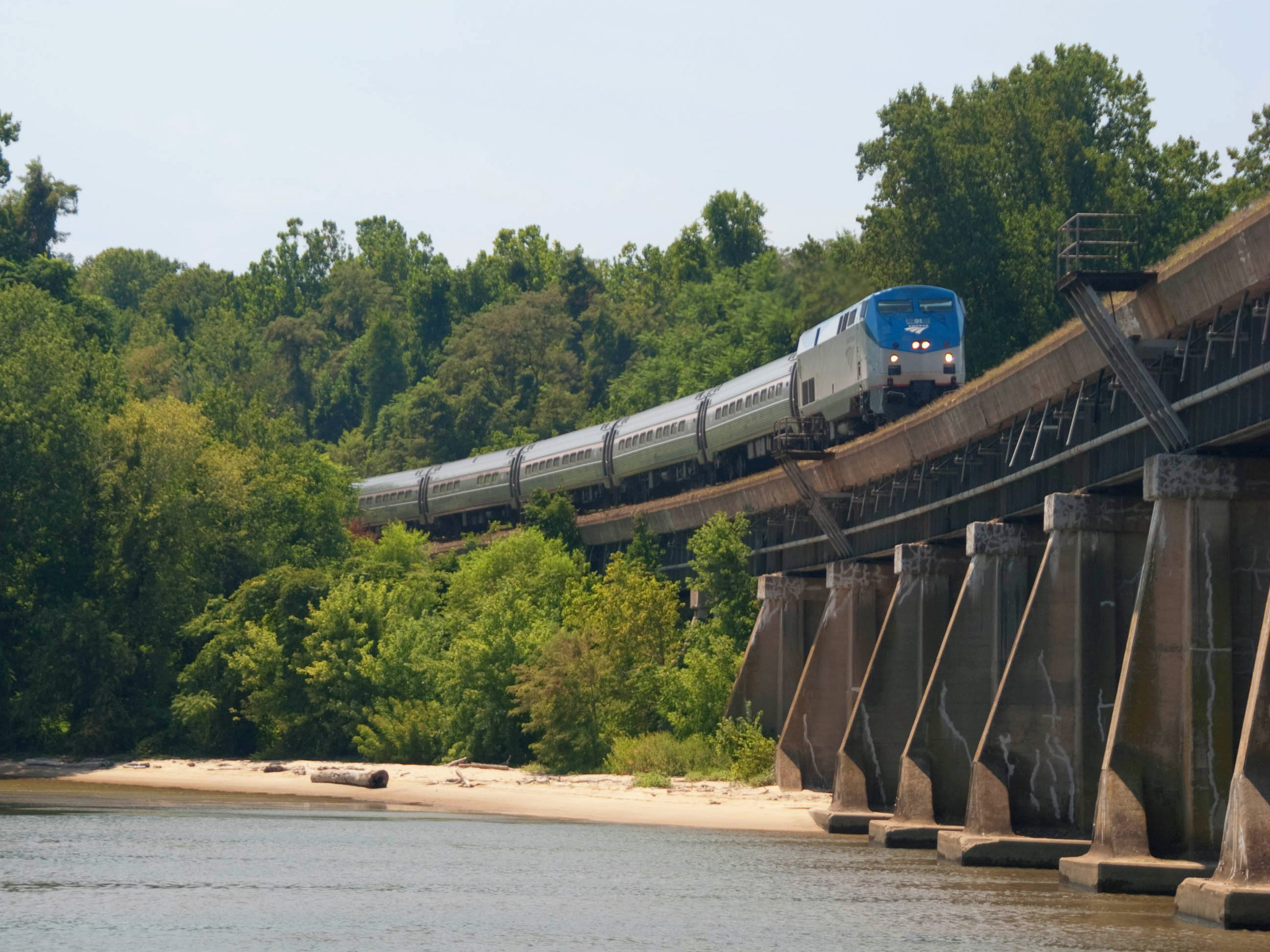
Northeast Regional crossing Powells Creek

Powells Creek starts northeast of the Prince William County Landfill in Independent Hill. The creek flows southeast from there and crosses Minnieville Road and Spriggs Road before being interrupted in Montclair at Lake Montclair. Powells Creek continues flow southeast crossing Waterway Drive and Northgate Drive then under Interstate 95 into the Eagles Pointe community in Leesylvania where it passes through a tunnel under Kramer Estate Drive. The creek then passes under U.S. Route 1 and into the marshes near the mouth between Powell's Landing Park and Leesylvania State Park. The mouth is finally passed over by the Powells Creek Crossing of the RF&P Subdivision and then flows into the Potomac River at the Maryland border.

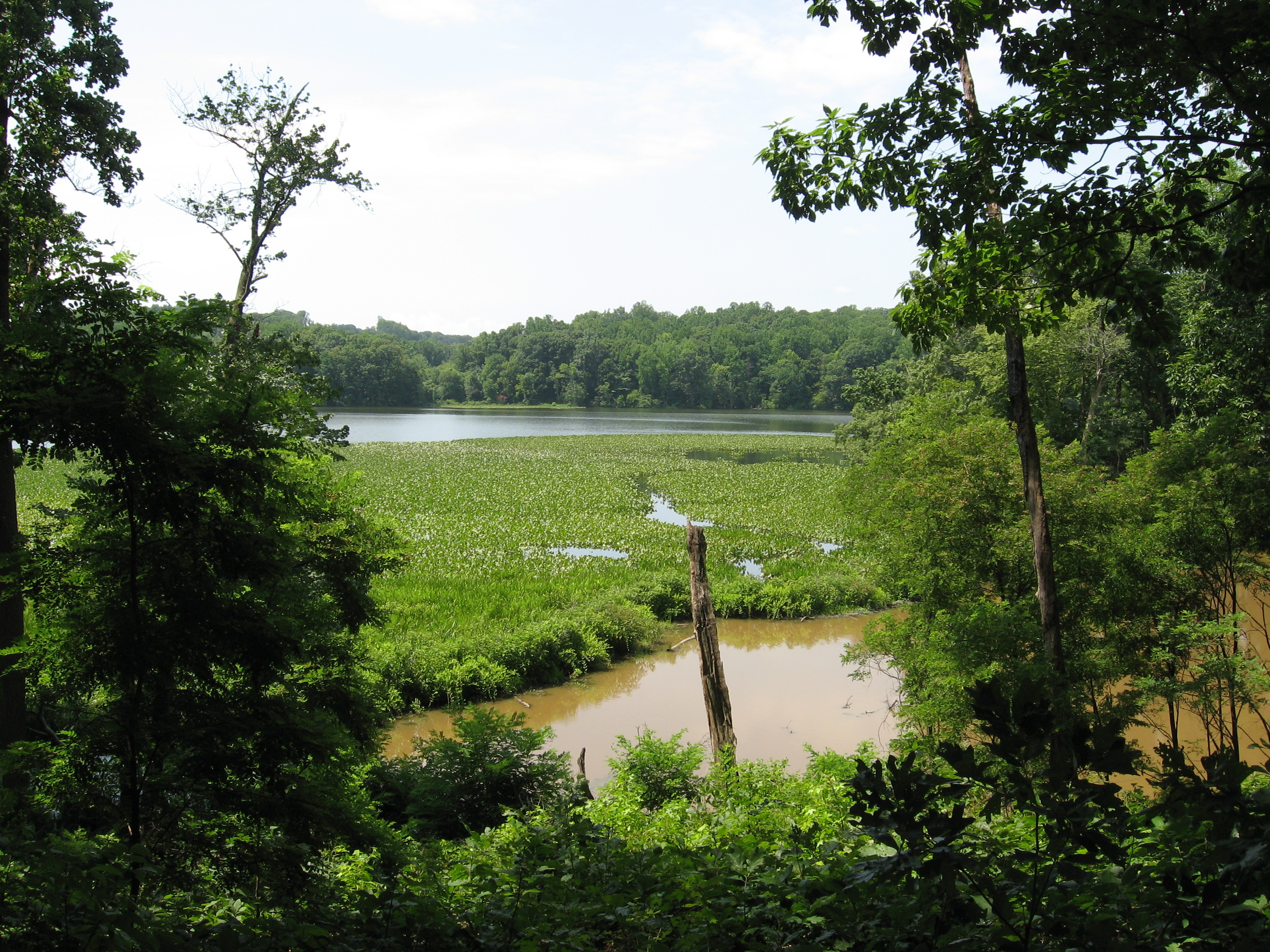
Powells Creek at Leesylvania State Park

== History ==
Powells Creek was originally referred to by the Doeg people as Yosococomico, (Note: According to GNIS, variants of this name include Yosocomico, Yosocomoco, Yeasocomico, Yeocococomico, and Yosockeccomocoe.) who inhabited the region from the 1600s to the 1700s.

On 3 December 2004, an accident occurred on the U.S. Route 1 bridge over Powells Creek where a truck hauling 27 tons of lime lost its trailer over the side of the bridge and into Powells Creek, spilling the material into the creek and killing fish.

In April 2021, the Prince William County Department of Public Works began work on its largest project, a nearly 1-mile restoration project along Powells Creek in Montclair, replacing sediment on the banks of the creek with wetlands to prevent flooding and damage to a sanitary sewer main transmission line and to restore the creek to its original state before development in the area.

== Boardwalk ==
In 2020, a boardwalk over Powells Creek connecting the Potomac Shores development and Leesylvania State Park similar to the Neabsco Creek Boardwalk was considered by David Brickley, who originally proposed the Neabsco Creek Boardwalk, and supported by Woodbridge District Supervisor Margaret Franklin. Funding for such a project was previously secured in 2019 with a budget of $9.5 million. The Prince William County Department of Parks and Recreation appointed Michigan firm INFORM Studios to design a boardwalk which would connect two trails on each side of the creek, serving as a segment along the Potomac Heritage National Scenic Trail, and provide facilities for recreational biking, fishing, and canoeing and kayaking. The Board of County Supervisors Approved funding for the design process at a September 12, 2023 meeting.
