= Farnam =

Farnam may refer to the following:

== Places ==
- Farnam, Iran, a village in Markazi Province, Iran
- Farnam, Nebraska, a village in Dawson County

In Omaha, Nebraska, USA

- Farnam Building
- West Farnam Apartments
- West Farnam neighborhood

In Cheshire, Massachusetts, USA

- Farnams Village Historic District

In Oneida, New York, USA

- Farnam Mansion

== People ==
- C. Eugene Farnam (1916–1999), American politician
- Farnam Jahanian, Carnegie Mellon University president
- Henry Farnam (1803–1883), American railroad executive
- Henry Walcott Farnam (1853–1933), American economist
- Louise Whitman Farnam (1890–1949), American physician
- Lynnwood Farnam (1885–1930), Canadian organist
- Ruth Stanley Farnam (1873–1956), American nurse, soldier and writer

== See also ==
- Farnham (disambiguation)
- Farnum (disambiguation)
- Marshall Farnam Hurd (1823–1903), American civil engineer and nephew of Henry Farnam
