= Virginia State Route 610 (Prince William County) =

Highway in Prince William County, Virginia

State Route 610

Route information
- Maintained by VDOT
- Length: 6.15 mi (9.90 km)

Major junctions
- West end: SR 640 in Dale City
- US 1 in Leesylvania
- East end: Dead end in Leesylvania

Location
- Country: United States
- State: Virginia
- County: Prince William

Highway system
- Virginia Routes; Interstate; US; Primary; Secondary; Byways; History; HOT lanes

State Route 610 (SR 610) in Prince William County, Virginia, United States, is a 6.2-mile-long (10.0 km) secondary state highway officially named Cardinal Drive west of U.S. Route 1 (US 1) and Neabsco Road to the east. It acts as a major east–west thoroughfare through the southeastern area of Prince William County, acting as part of the boundary between the communities Dale City and Montclair as well as bisecting the community of Leesylvania.

== Route description ==
SR 610 begins at SR 640 (Minnieville Road), heading eastward as four-lane divided highway with a 45 mph (72 km/h) speed limit and acting as the eastern boundary between the census-designated places of Dale City and Montclair. SR 610 has signalized intersections with the suburban through roads of Eastlawn Avenue and then Waterway Drive before the highway intersects the four-way signalized crossroads at SR 627 (Van Buren Road) and Benita Fitzgerald Drive, the latter acting as a major through road to SR 784 (Dale Boulevard). SR 610 enters the community of Leesylvania as it passes over Interstate 95 (I-95), then heads through a signalized intersection with SR 823 (Donald Curtis Drive) before passing through US 1.

After crossing US 1, SR 610 becomes Neabsco Road, named for the nearby Neabsco Creek. The route continues to head east along the Neabsco Creek Wetlands and then intersects SR 805 (Daniel K. Ludwig Drive), the entrance road into Leesylvania State Park. SR 610 continues southeast as a no-outlet route then finally terminates at the intersection of unnamed driveways near some marinas along Neabsco Creek.

== History ==
The 4.19-mile-long (6.74 km) Cardinal Drive section of SR 610 sees excessive speeding over its 45 mph (72 km/h) speed limit. In 2021, the third fatal accident along this stretch of road within a year occurred. After the family of an earlier victim called for changes to the road to prevent further deaths on Cardinal Drive, the county increased its traffic enforcement along the route, setting up speed boards to conduct a speed study. The county concluded that there was no excessive speeding, however other county board members disputed otherwise.

== Future ==
In 2022, as part of the approval of several transportation improvement projects in Northern Virginia over the following six years, the Northern Virginia Transportation Authority plans to widen Neabsco Road from two to four lanes between US 1 and Daniel K. Ludwig Drive.

== Major intersections ==
The entire route is in Prince William County.

Location	mi	km	Destinations	Notes
Dale City–Montclair line	0.00	0.00	SR 640 (Minnieville Road) / SR 2245 (Estate Drive)	Western terminus of SR 610; continuation northwest beyond terminus as SR 2245 (Estate Drive)
Dale City–Montclair line	0.16	0.26	SR 1930 (Eastlawn Avenue)	
Dale City–Montclair line	0.78	1.26	SR 1451 (Waterway Drive) / SR 3502 (Shotwell Court)	
Dale City–Montclair line	3.07	4.94	SR 627 (Van Buren Road) / SR 2480 (Benita Fitzgerald Drive)	
Leesylvania	3.98	6.41	SR 823 (Donald Curtis Drive) / Tassia Lane	
Leesylvania	4.19	6.74	US 1 (Richmond Highway)	
Leesylvania	5.72	9.21	SR 805 (Daniel K. Ludwig Drive)	Access to Leesylvania State Park
Leesylvania	6.15	9.90	Dead end	Eastern terminus of SR 610; continuation east beyond terminus as an unnamed driveway
1.000 mi = 1.609 km; 1.000 km = 0.621 mi
