= The Hollywood Sculpture Garden =

Sculpture garden in Los Angeles, California, U.S.

Coordinates: 34.113942°N 118.323551°W

- Interactive map of The Hollywood Sculpture Garden
- Location: Los Angeles, California, United States

The Hollywood Sculpture Garden is an outdoor garden in Los Angeles dedicated to the display of sculptures by various artists, including local, national, and international artists.

It was founded in May 2012, by Dr. Robby Gordon, and is located at 2430 Vasanta Way, Los Angeles in the Hollywood Hills (below the Hollywood sign). It currently hosts over 150 different sculptures, which can be viewed from street-level, as well as during private events and pre-arranged appointments.

The Hollywood Sculpture Garden is open to the public (viewings by appointment only), and also holds regular art receptions and fundraisers. It was featured in Los Angeles Magazine on the "Best of LA" list (issue 08/17), as well as other publications and websites. Atlas Obscura touted it as a, "A Dazzling Hodgepodge in the Hills," in its article, An Explorer's Guide To Hidden Hollywood.

The Hollywood Sculpture Garden is also occasionally used as a backdrop for film productions and photoshoots. It may be rented as a venue for a range of events, including fashion shows, weddings, private parties, and pop-up art shows.

== Gallery ==
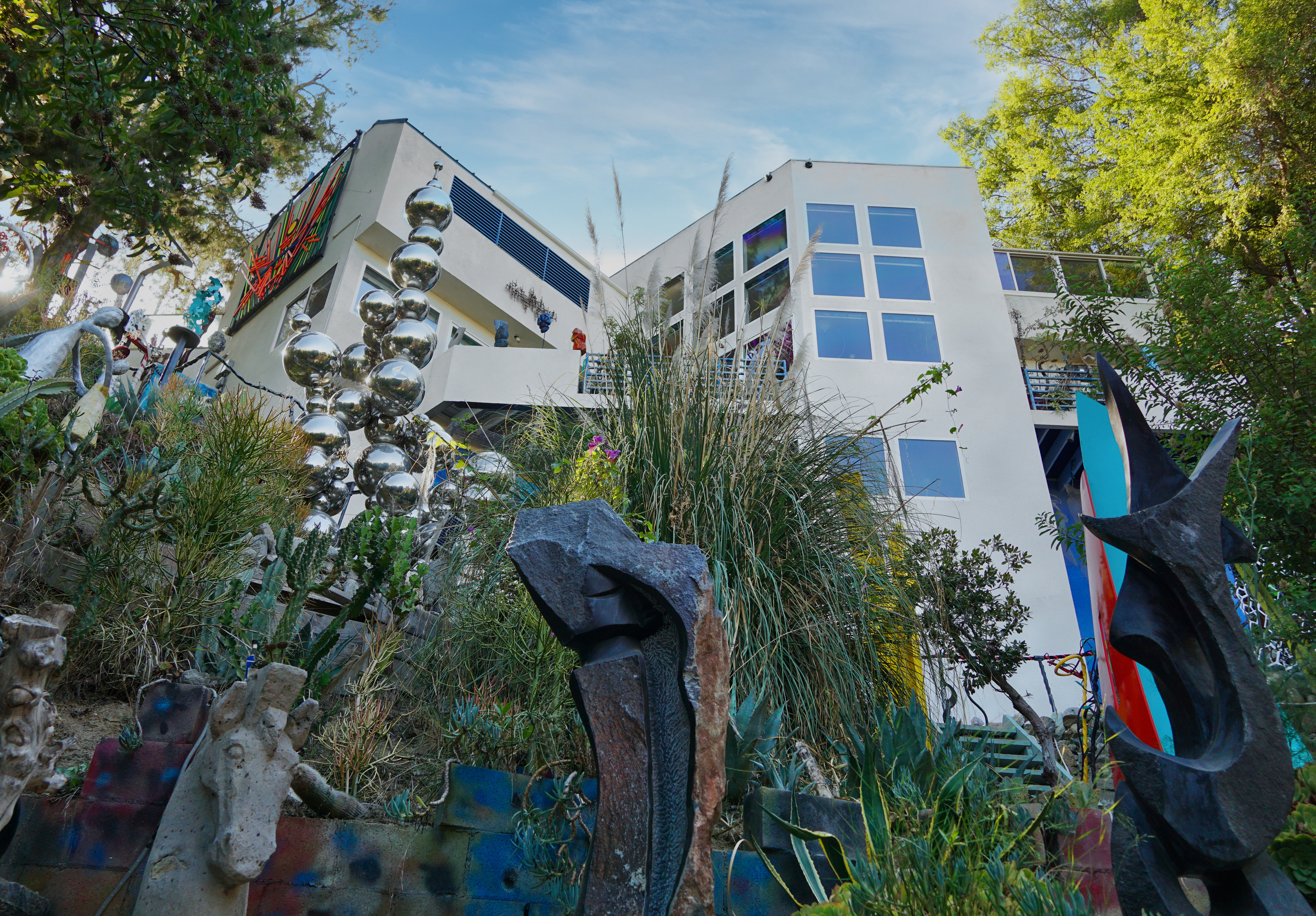
Garden and studio building

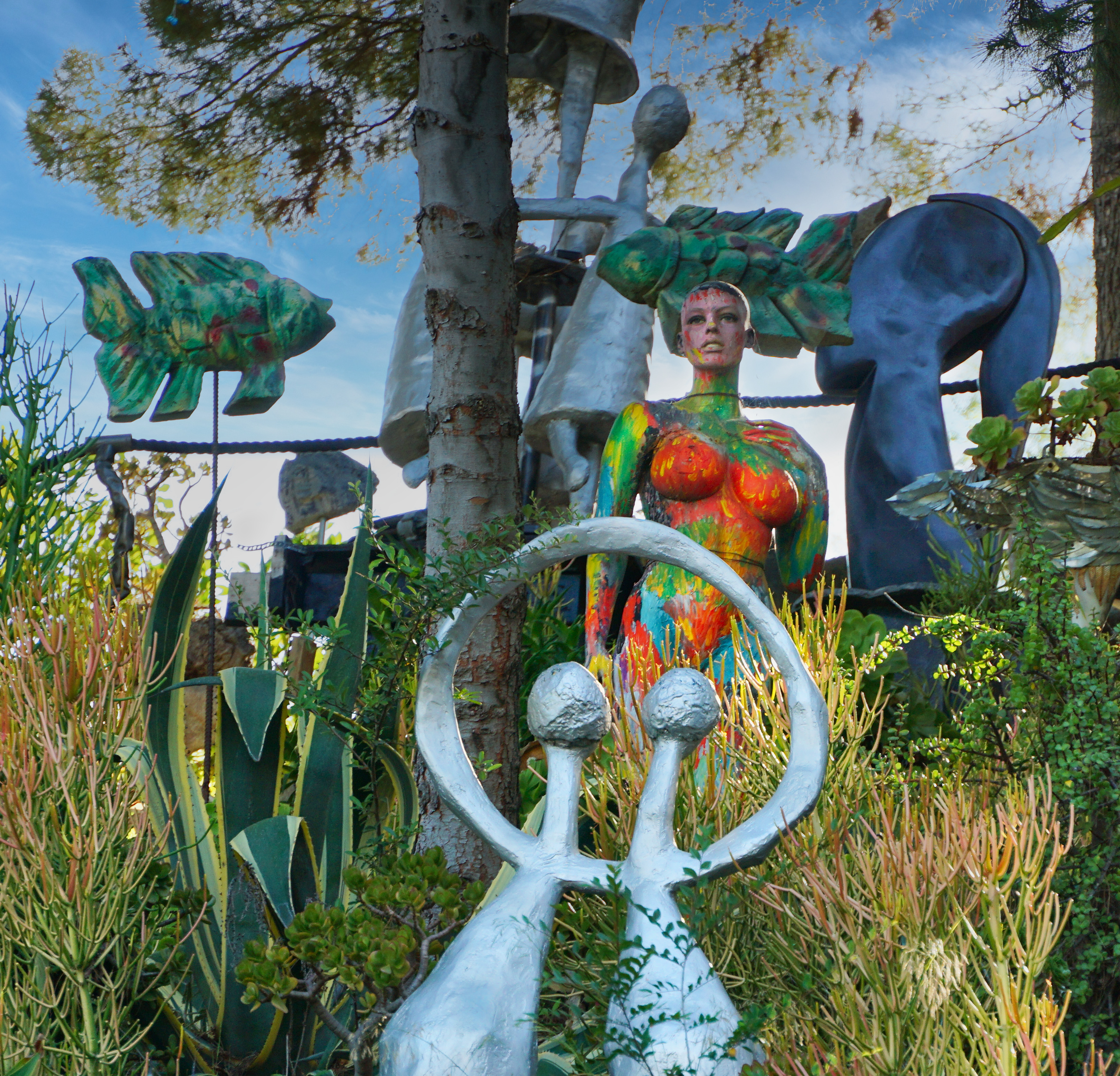
Garden sculptures

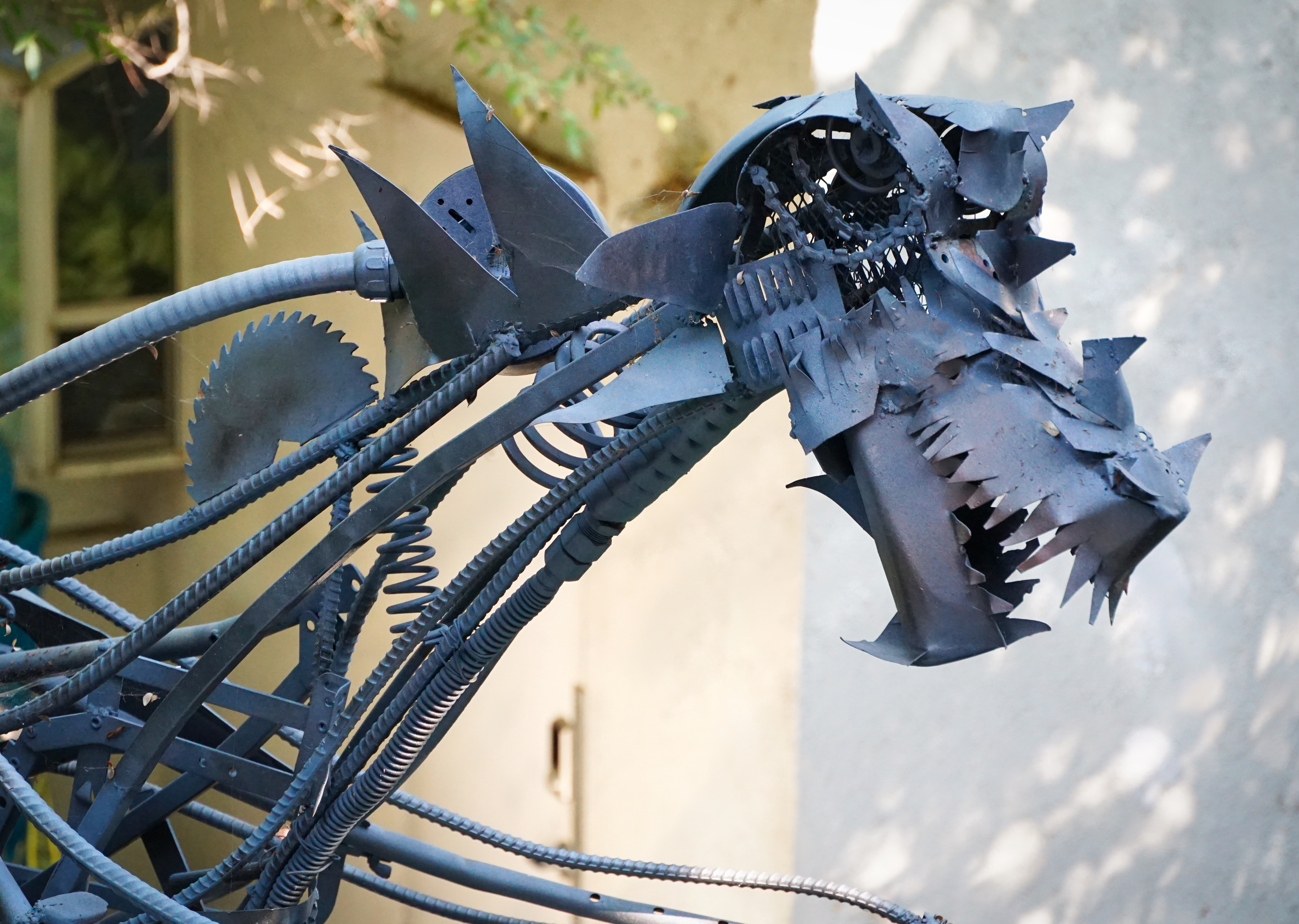
Dinosaur metal sculpture
