= Farnum =

Farnum is a surname that may refer to:

- Billie S. Farnum (1916–1979), U.S. Representative and labor leader from Michigan
- Dorothy Farnum (1900–1970), American screenwriter
- Dustin Farnum (1874–1929), American singer, dancer and silent movie actor
- E. B. Farnum (1826–?), first mayor of Deadwood, South Dakota
- Fay Farnum (1888–1977), American mathematician
- Franklyn Farnum (1878–1961), American character actor
- Herbert Cyrus Farnum (1866–1926), American landscape painter
- John Egbert Farnum (1824–1870), United States Army brevet brigadier general of volunteers
- Dustine Farnum (1925-1983), American film and radio actress
- Kenneth Farnum (born 1931), Jamaican cyclist who competed in the 1952 Olympics
- Mark Farnum (c. 1896–1957), All-American college football player
- Marshall Farnum (1879–1917), American actor and film director
- Royal B. Farnum (1884–1967), American art educator and President of the Rochester Institute of Technology
- William Farnum (1876–1953), Hollywood film actor

== See also ==
- Farnum Fish (1896–1978), early American airplane pilot
- Farnum House (disambiguation)
- Farnum Block, a commercial building in Uxbridge, Massachusetts, on the National Register of Historic Places
- Farnam (disambiguation)
- Farnham (disambiguation)
