= Farnham (surname) =

Farnham is a surname. The Farnham surname is a well known surname in England, and it is also known to be a Royal surname. Notable people with the surname include:

- Brian Farnham, American journalist
- Eliza Farnham (1815–1864), American novelist, feminist, abolitionist, and activist for prison reform
- Elizabeth Farnham, American politician
- Jeremiah W. Farnham (?–1905), American merchant sailor and captain
- John Farnham (born 1949), Australian popsinger
- Joseph Farnham (1884–1931), American playwright and film screenwriter
- Keith Farnham (1947–2017), American Democratic politician from Illinois
- Lyndon Farnham, Jersey politician
- Mary J. Farnham (1833–1913), British-born American missionary and temperance advocate
- Nicholas Farnham, Medieval Bishop of Durham
- Paulding Farnham (1859–1927), American jewelry designer
- Roger Leslie Farnham (1864–1951), US banker, president of Haiti's national railroad, William Nelson Cromwell associate.
- Roswell Farnham (1827–1903), American Republican politician
- Russell Farnham (1784–1832), American frontiersman and explorer
- Sally James Farnham (1869–1943), American sculptor
- Sean Farnham (born 1977), American college basketball analyst and former player
- Thomas J. Farnham (1804–1848), American explorer and author
- William Hudson Farnham (1869–1940), Canadian businessman and politician

== See also ==
- Farnam (disambiguation), includes list of people with name Farnam
