= Warren Webster =

American businessman

Warren Webster is CEO of live music promoter Sofar Sounds. He previously led travel and exploration company Atlas Obscura. He was previously the president and co-founder of Patch Media, a network of more than 900 local news sites launched in 2007 and sold in 2009 to AOL. Webster departed Patch in 2014 to become COO of goop, the lifestyle company founded by actress Gwyneth Paltrow.

Webster was named in Forbes Magazine as Arianna Huffington's list of "Most Powerful People in Media" alongside Patch Editor-in-Chief Brian Farnham, as well as Business Insider's "SAI 100 New York Tech" list in 2010 and 2011. Originally from Osterville, Massachusetts, Webster attended St. Lawrence University and lives in New York City.

At Atlas Obscura, he expanded brand partnerships and oversaw the company's first profitable quarter.

Webster joined Sofar Sounds in 2024.
