= Leah Cleaver =

English singer-songwriter

Leah Cleaver (born 1996/1997) is an English singer-songwriter. The former lead singer of ZEBEDE, she released her debut EP Pushing Up Flowers in October 2025. She was named to the 2026 NME 100.

== Career ==
Cleaver began her career doing gigs around London at various bars and clubs, which helped her build a fanbase. She was the lead singer of the neosoul group ZEBEDE that formed in 2018, performing regularly at Sofar Sounds. In 2025 she began making music as a solo artist. Cleaver's music crosses genres and has been referred to as "vivid alt pop," "chameleonic pop," as well as "jump scare music" by Cleaver herself. She is an alto.

She named Luke Kelly and the Dubliners as early favorite musicians. She described her experience of hearing Otis Redding for the first time as particularly resonant. Little Simz, Nina Simone, Talking Heads, and Sly and the Family Stone are additional influences.

Cleaver released the single "Last Time" in September 2025, which Sophie Wyatt of Haste Magazine reviewed as "pivoting between gentle keys, funky bass and an eruption of rattling guitars, stomping drums and rippling synths." She released the next single "Have You Ever?"; it was referred to by Ed Lindsay of Wordplay Magazine as "built on bouncy drums and jittery piano, the track feels like golden hour in August — dramatic, hilarious, and full of affection." Cleaver's debut EP Pushing Up Flowers was released in October 2025. She described the project as "directly speaking to the women in my life who inspire me to be louder and braver."

In May 2026 she released the single "LIKE, YEH." Sam Rasmin of Creative Gen UK wrote in a positive review, "with this latest release, Leah Cleaver continues to prove she’s one of the UK’s most intriguing emerging voices."

== Personal life ==
Cleaver was raised in Devon. She is biracial of Jamaican and Irish descent. She moved to London at age 18, where she attended university at BIMM London. She resides in East London.

She is bisexual.

She co-founded the organisation U Gd, Girl? with her friend, Beth. They host events and workshops for women and nonbinary people on issues of health and personal development.

== Accolades ==
- NME 100 Essential Emerging Artists for 2026
