= Freestone Point Confederate Battery =

- U.S. National Register of Historic Places
- Virginia Landmarks Register
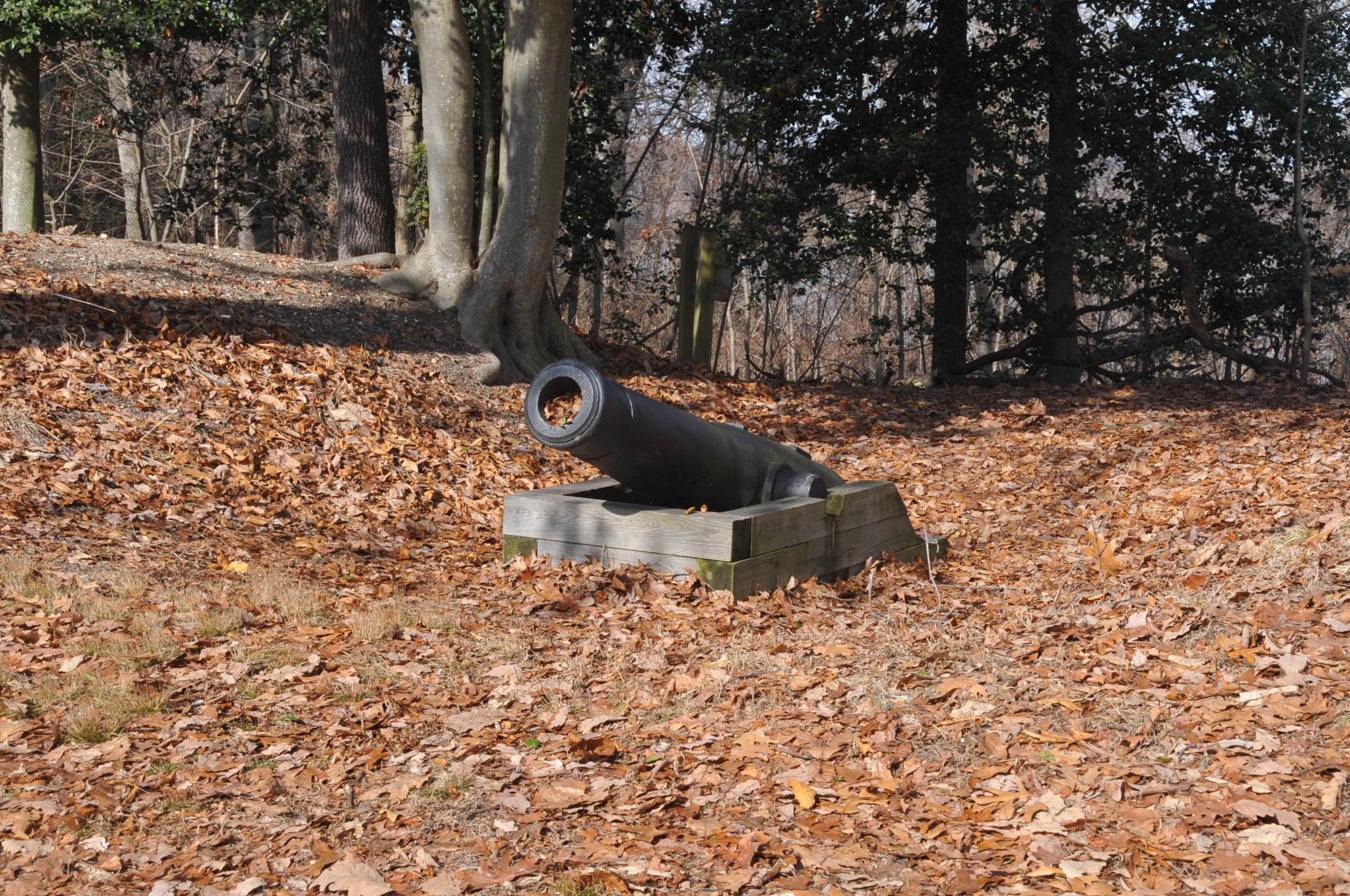

- Location within Northern Virginia Location within Virginia Location within the United States
- Location: At the Potomac River off U.S. Route 1 in Leesylvania State Park, Woodbridge, Virginia
- Coordinates: 38°35′34″N 77°14′57″W
- Area: 11 acres (4.5 ha)
- Built: 1861
- MPS: Civil War Properties in Prince William County MPS
- NRHP reference No.: 89001059
- VLR No.: 076-0264

Significant dates
- Added to NRHP: August 18, 1989
- Designated VLR: February 21, 1989

Freestone Point Confederate Battery is a historic American Civil War gun emplacement located at Leesylvania State Park, Woodbridge, Prince William County, Virginia. The battery has four individual gun emplacements, which are fairly simple in configuration. All are formed by a large, deep, rectangular depression with high earthen berms built up on the north and south side of each depression. Three of the batteries are located on the cliff about 90 feet above the Potomac River. For five months, from October 1861 to March 1862, the batteries contributed to the Confederate military's success in blockading the Potomac River.

It was listed on the National Register of Historic Places in 1989.

== Gallery ==
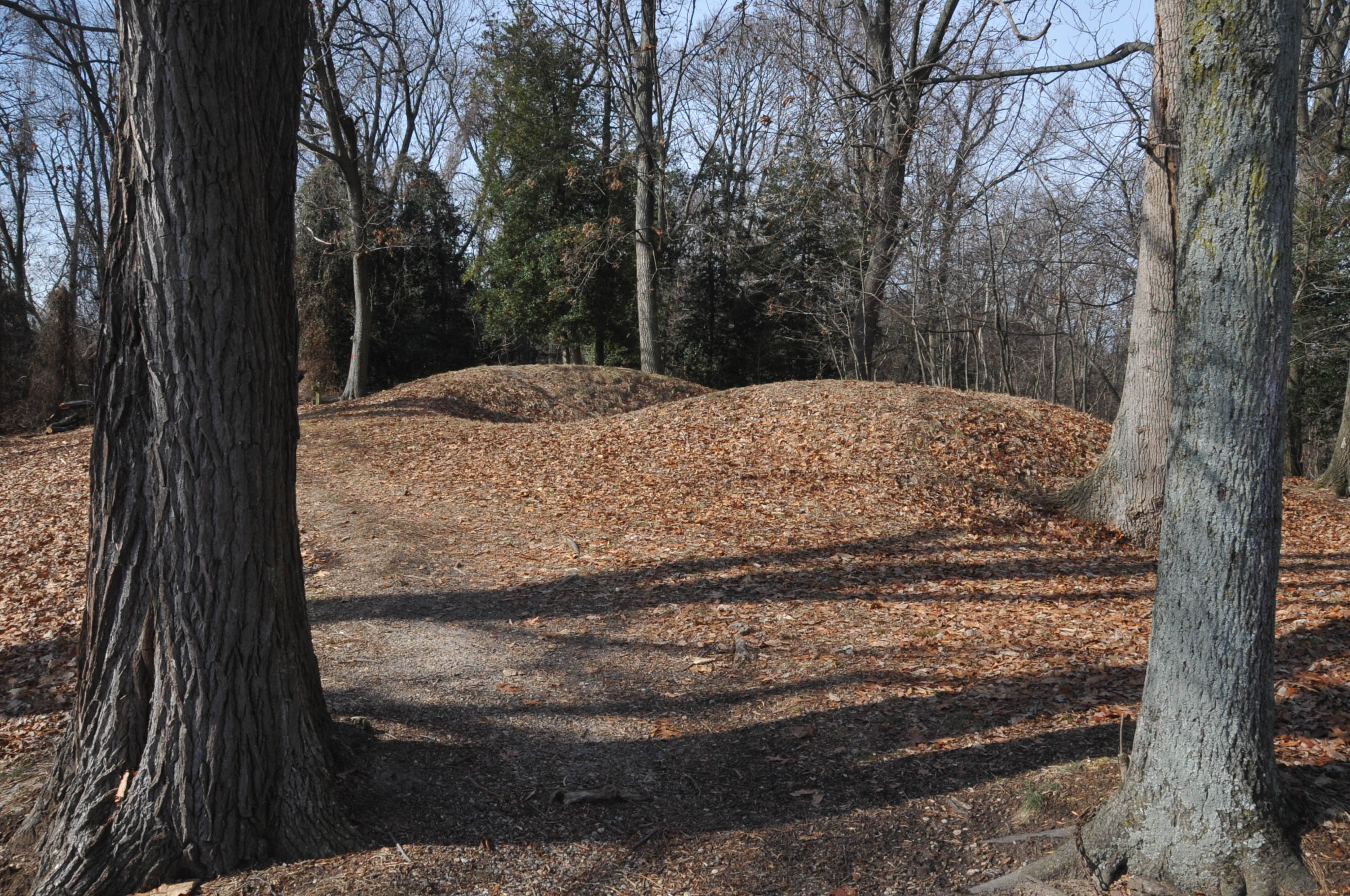

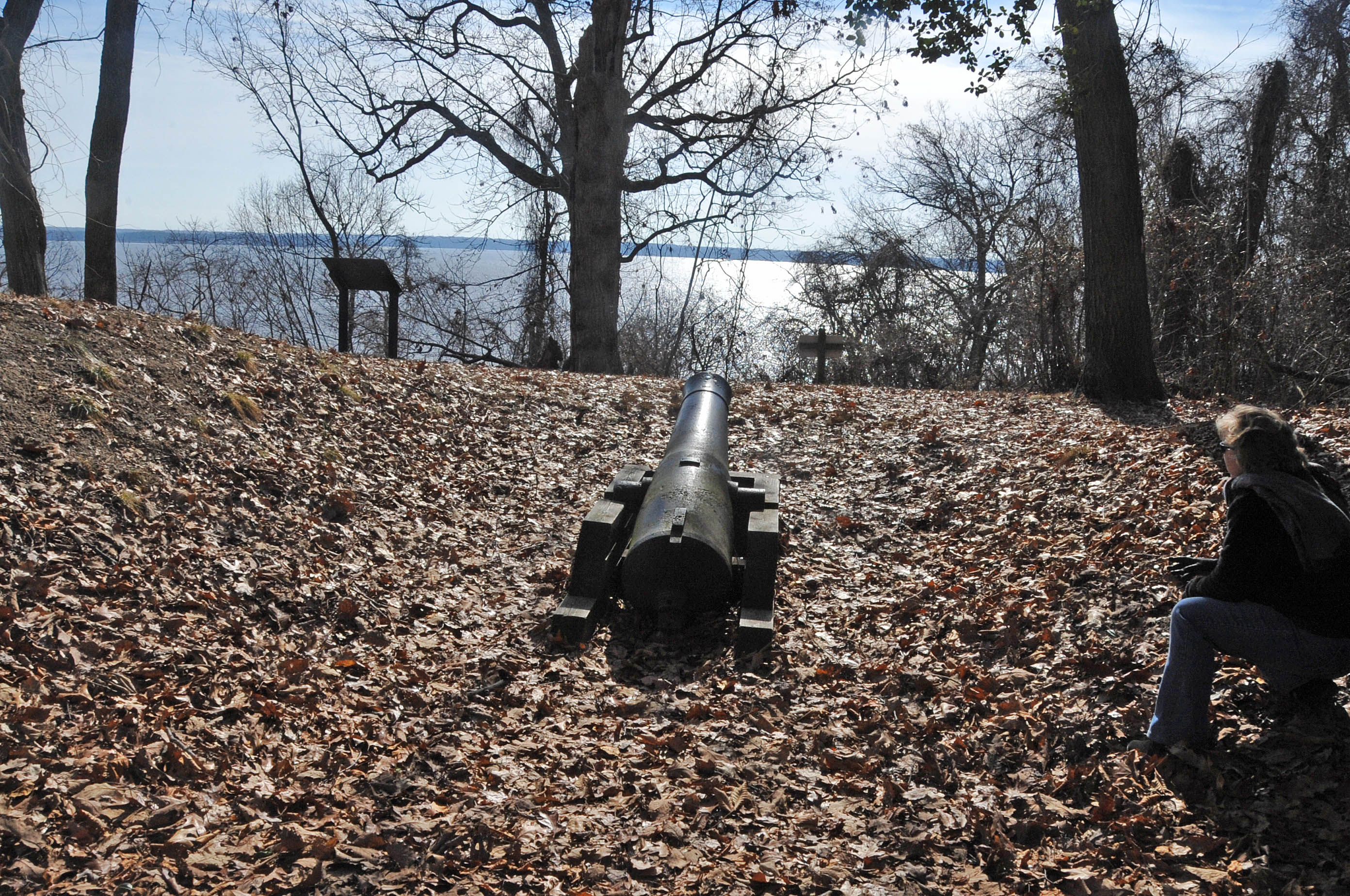

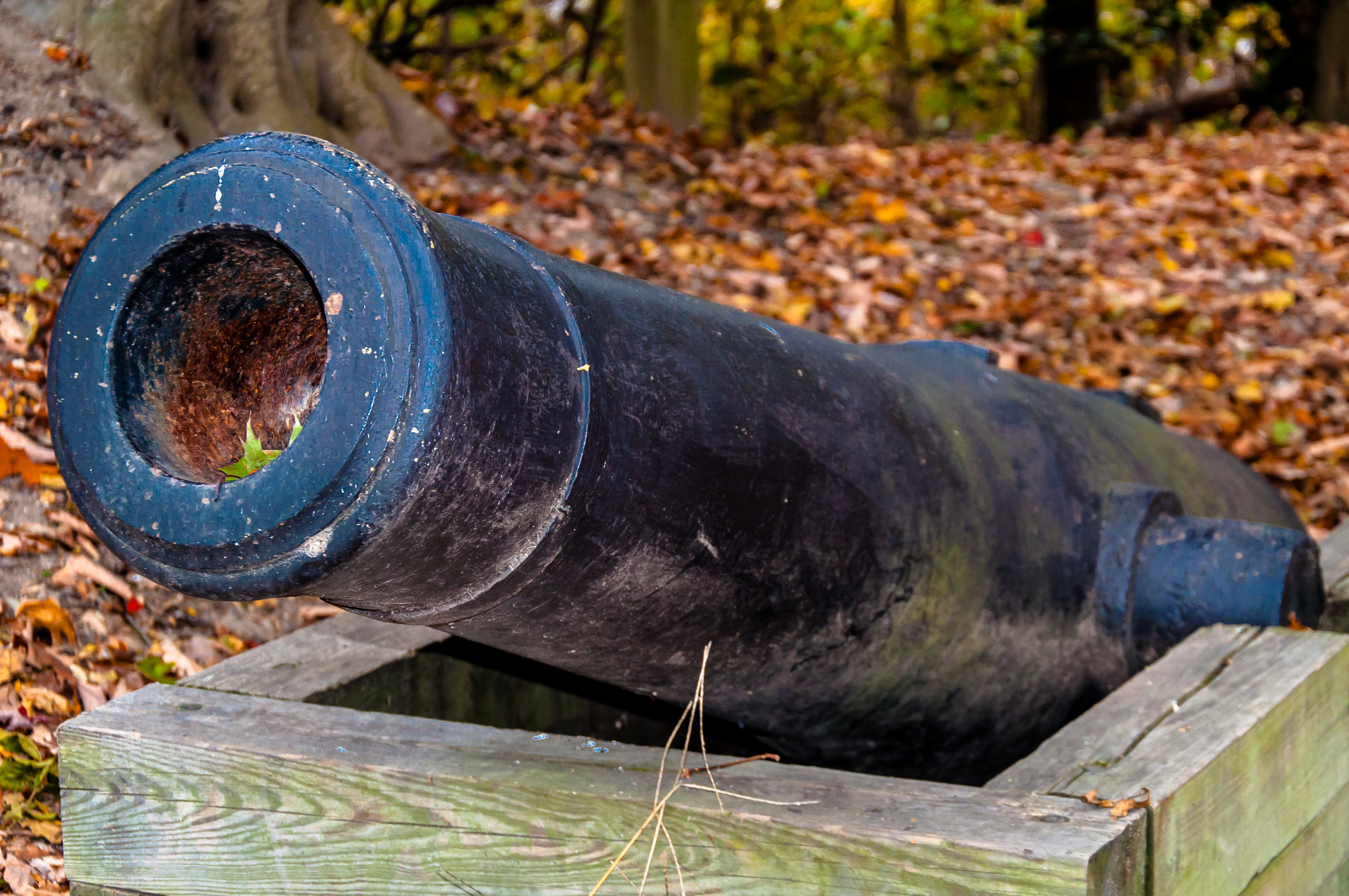
