= Doeg people =

Native American people

Doeg
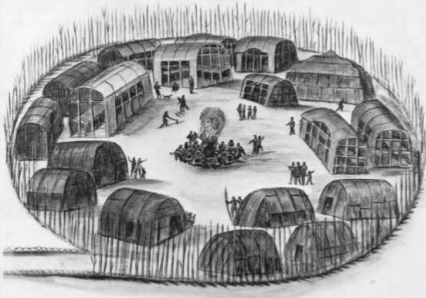
- Watercolor by John White depicting an Algonquian village similar in appearance to villages in Tsenacommacah.

Total population
- Extinct as a tribe

Regions with significant populations
- Virginia and Maryland

Languages
- Piscataway or Nanticoke (historical)

Religion
- Native American religion

Related ethnic groups
- Nanticoke, Pamunkey, Chickahominy

The Doeg (also called Dogue, Taux, Tauxenent) were a Native American people who lived in Virginia. They spoke an Algonquian language and may have been a branch of the Nanticoke tribe, historically based on the Eastern Shore of Maryland. The Nanticoke considered the Algonquian Lenape as "grandfathers". The Doeg are known for a raid in July 1675 that contributed to colonists' uprising in Bacon's Rebellion.

== Background ==
The Doeg (or Dogue) tribe of Virginia were part of the coastal Algonquian language family. They probably spoke Piscataway or a dialect similar to Nanticoke.

According to one account, the Doeg had been based in what is now King George County, but about 50 years before the founding of Jamestown (c. 1557), they split into three sections, with groups going to Caroline County and Prince William County, and one remaining in King George.

When Captain John Smith visited the upper Potomac River in 1608, he noted that the Taux lived there above Aquia Creek, with their capital Tauxenent located on "Doggs Island" (also known as Miompse or May-Umps, now Mason Neck, Virginia.) They gathered fish and also grew corn. Other hamlets were at Pamacocack (later anglicized to "Quantico"), along Quantico Creek; Yosococomico (now Powells Creek); and Niopsco (Neabsco Creek). Associated with them were other nearby Algonquian peoples — the Moyauns (Piscataway) on the Maryland side, and the Nacotchtank (Anacostan) in what is now the Washington, DC area. Smith's map also shows a settlement called Tauxsnitania, thought to be near present-day Waterloo in Fauquier County, within the territory of the Siouan-speaking Manahoac tribe.

John Lederer, who visited the Piedmont region of Virginia in 1670, wrote that the entire area had been

"formerly possessed by the Tacci, alias Dogi, but... the Indians now seated here, are distinguished into the several nations of Mahoc, Nuntaneuck alias Nuntaly, Nahyssan, Sapon, Managog, Mangoack, Akernatatzy and Monakin etc."
Further, "The Indians now seated in these parts are none of those whom the English removed from Virginia, but a people driven by the enemy from the northwest, and invited to sit down here by an oracle above four hundred years since, as they pretend for the ancient inhabitants of Virginia were far more rude and barbarous, feeding only upon raw flesh and fish, until they taught them to plant corn..."

== Frontier ==
In the 1650s, as English colonists began to settle the Northern Neck frontier, then known as Chicacoan (Secocowon), some Doeg, Patawomeck and Rappahannock began moving into the region as well. They joined local tribes in disputing the settlers' claims to land and resources. In July 1666, the colonists declared war on them. By 1669, colonists had patented the land on the west of the Potomac as far north as My Lord's Island. By 1670, they had driven most of the Doeg out of the Virginia colony and into Maryland—apart from those living beside the Nanzatico/Portobago in Caroline County, Virginia.

Tensions between English colonists and the Doeg on the Northern Neck continued to grow. In July 1675, a Doeg raiding party crossed the Potomac and stole hogs from Thomas Mathew, in retaliation for his not paying them for trade goods. Mathew and other colonists pursued them to Maryland and killed a group of Doeg, as well as innocent Susquehannock. A Doeg war party retaliated by killing Mathew's son and two servants on his plantation.

A Virginian militia led by Nathaniel Bacon entered Maryland, attacked the Doeg and besieged the Susquehannock. This precipitated the general reaction against natives by the Virginia Colony that resulted in "Bacon's Rebellion". Following this conflict, the Doeg seem to have become allied with the Nanzatico tribe, who paid for the release of some Doeg jailed for killing livestock in early 1692. The Doeg maintained a presence near Nanzatico at "Doguetown" (around Milford in Caroline County) as late as 1720.

== "Welsh Indians" ==
A belief in the existence of "Welsh Indians" has connected the Doeg to an apocryphal 12th century Welsh prince named Madoc, who, according to folklore, visited North America. This was based on claims during the late 17th century that people calling themselves "Doeg" understood the Welsh language.

A clergyman of Welsh origins, the Reverend Morgan Jones, told Thomas Lloyd, lieutenant-governor of the Province of Pennsylvania that he had been captured in 1669, by members of a tribe that called themselves "Doeg". Jones said that his life had been spared by his captors only after their chief heard Jones speaking Welsh, a language that the chief understood. Jones reportedly claimed that he had stayed with the Doeg for months and preached to them in Welsh. Jones later returned to the English colonies. He recorded his adventure in 1686 in a letter which was originally sent to Lloyd and after passing through other hands was printed in The Gentleman's Magazine by Theophilus Evans, Vicar of St David's in Brecon. Welsh historian Gwyn A. Williams commented (in 1979) that the anecdote was "a complete farrago and may have been intended as a hoax". Apart from the improbability of their connection with Madoc (if he existed), the "Doeg" encountered by Jones were described as a sub-group of Tuscarora, and there is no evidence the Doeg were a subgroup of the Tuscarora.

A prior similar confusion of a neighboring Native American people’s tongue with Welsh was in 1608, among the Christopher Newport party exploring the Province of Virginia between the area that would later become Richmond and the Piedmont. A native Welsh speaker, Peter Wynne, had been sent along as a translator, and could not understand the local Monacan language.

== Legacy ==
Dogue, Virginia is named in honor of this tribe. Dogue Creek, a tributary of the Potomac River in Fairfax County, Virginia is also named after this tribe. George Washington owned a farm called Dogue Run Quarter, now Woodlawn Historic Site.
