= Dogue Creek =

River in Fairfax County, Virginia, USA

Coordinates: 38.7099°N 77.1328°W

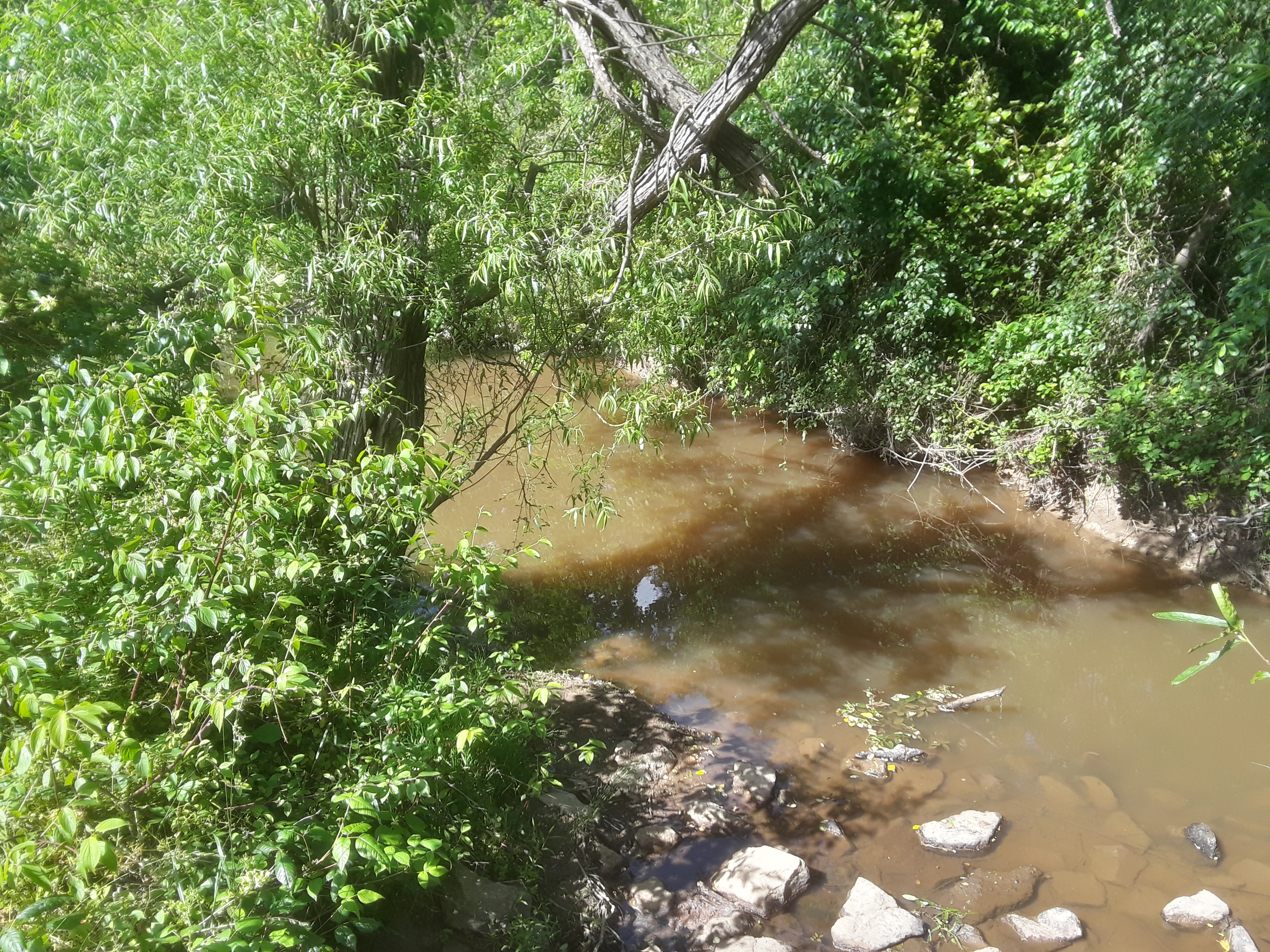
- Dogue Creek in the Jackson M. Abbott Wetland Refuge

Location
- Country: United States
- Location: Fairfax County, Virginia

Physical characteristics
- Mouth
  - location: Potomac River
  - elevation: 0 feet (0 m)
- Length: 8.5 mi (13.7 km)

Dogue Creek is an 8.5-mile-long (13.7 km) tributary of the Potomac River in Fairfax County, Virginia, named for the Doeg people. The lower 3 miles (5 km) of the creek form a tidal embayment of the Potomac to the east of Fort Belvoir.

== Variant names ==
The Board on Geographic Names decided upon Dogue Creek as the stream's official name in 1892. Previously, it had been known by the following names according to the Geographic Names Information System:

- Doag Creek
- Doeg Creek
- Dog's Creek
- Dogue Run
- Epsewassen Creek
- Epsewasson
- Epsewasson Creek
- Hopkins Creek
- Hopkins' Creek

== See also ==
- List of rivers of Virginia
