= Southbridge, Virginia =

Southbridge
- Unincorporated community
- Location within the state of Virginia Southbridge (Virginia) Southbridge (the United States)
- Coordinates: 38°34′33″N 77°17′58″W
- Country: United States
- State: Virginia
- County: Prince William
- Time zone: UTC−5 (Eastern (EST))
  - Summer (DST): UTC−4 (EDT)
- ZIP codes: 22026
- Area codes: 703, 571

Southbridge is an unincorporated master-planned community of over 1,500 homes with more than 5,000 residents located in Prince William County, Virginia, United States. It is situated on over 600 acres (2.4 km^{2}) near the Potomac River on the Cherry Hill peninsula just north of the Town of Dumfries.

== History ==
Founded in 1990, Southbridge features a private swim and racquet club with pools, tennis courts, tot lots, and a nature trail. Southbridge's adjacent sister community, Potomac Shores, has built an 18-hole Signature golf course designed by Jack Nicklaus.

These communities are also home to John Paul the Great Catholic High School which opened August 25, 2008. Pope John Paul the Great Catholic High School is in the Diocese of Arlington. The new 40-acre (160,000 m^{2}) campus will eventually have a capacity of 1000 students.

Southbridge is located near Interstate 95 and State Route 234 (the Ronald Wilson Reagan Memorial Highway), just off U.S. Route 1, providing access to Washington, D.C. 30 miles (48 km) to the north and the rest of Northern Virginia.

A Virginia Railway Express station is set to open at Cherry Hill once track work is completed. Swans Creek Elementary School, located within the confines of Southbridge, is part of the Prince William County Public School System.

The U.S. Postal Service has deemed that residents may use "Southbridge, VA" as their mailing address, sharing the 22026 ZIP code with the Town of Dumfries. In addition, the Virginia Department of Motor Vehicles allows residents to select "Southbridge, VA" as their legal residence for their driver's license and vehicle registration.

Southbridge is governed by the Southbridge Community Association, which retains Cardinal Management Group as its on-site property manager. Residents are represented on the Southbridge Community Association by a nine-member board of directors. Each year, three directors are elected to a three-year term on the board. In the event that a vacancy occurs before the expiration of a director's term, an individual is appointed by the remaining directors to fill the seat until the next association annual meeting at which time an election is held for the remainder of the unexpired term.

The current members of the board of directors are:

Nick Antonetti, president (term expires 2017); Doug Thornton, vice president (term expires 2015); Rob Hicks, treasurer (term expires 2015); Rich Inlow, secretary (term expires 2016); Candy Arthur, director (term expires 2016); John Letsen, director (term expires 2017) Michael Mumford, director (term expires 2017); Jim Riley, director (term expires 2015); and Matt Webb, director (term expires 2016).

Southbridge celebrated its 20th anniversary in 2010.

== Geography ==
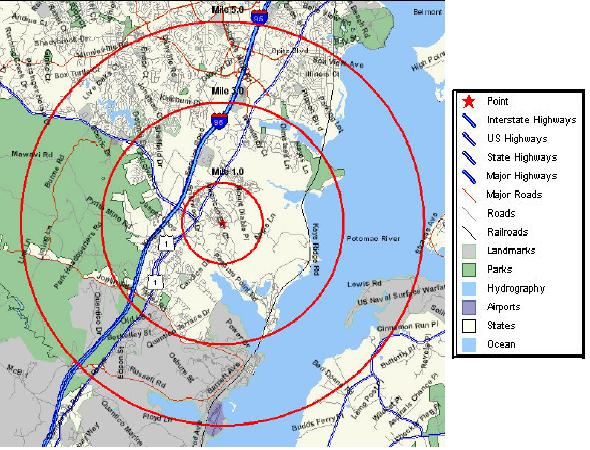
Location of Southbridge, Virginia

Southbridge is located at 38°34'33" North, 77°17'58" West (38.5759, −77.299633).

== Census data ==
Southbridge is part of the Cherry Hill census-designated place. As of the 2010 census, the CDP had a total population of 16,000.
