= Atlas Obscura =

American magazine and media company

- Website type: Travel and Exploration
- Available in: English
- Founder: Joshua Foer Dylan Thuras
- CEO: Louise Story
- Website: www.atlasobscura.com
- Commercial: Yes
- Registration: 2009; 17 years ago
- Launched: 2009; 17 years ago
- OCLC number: 960889351

Atlas Obscura is an American-based travel and exploration company. It was founded in 2009 by author Joshua Foer and documentary filmmaker/author Dylan Thuras. It catalogs unusual and obscure travel destinations via professional and user-generated content, operates group trips to destinations around the world, produces a daily podcast, as well as books, TV and film. The brand covers a number of topics including history, science, food, and obscure places.

== History ==
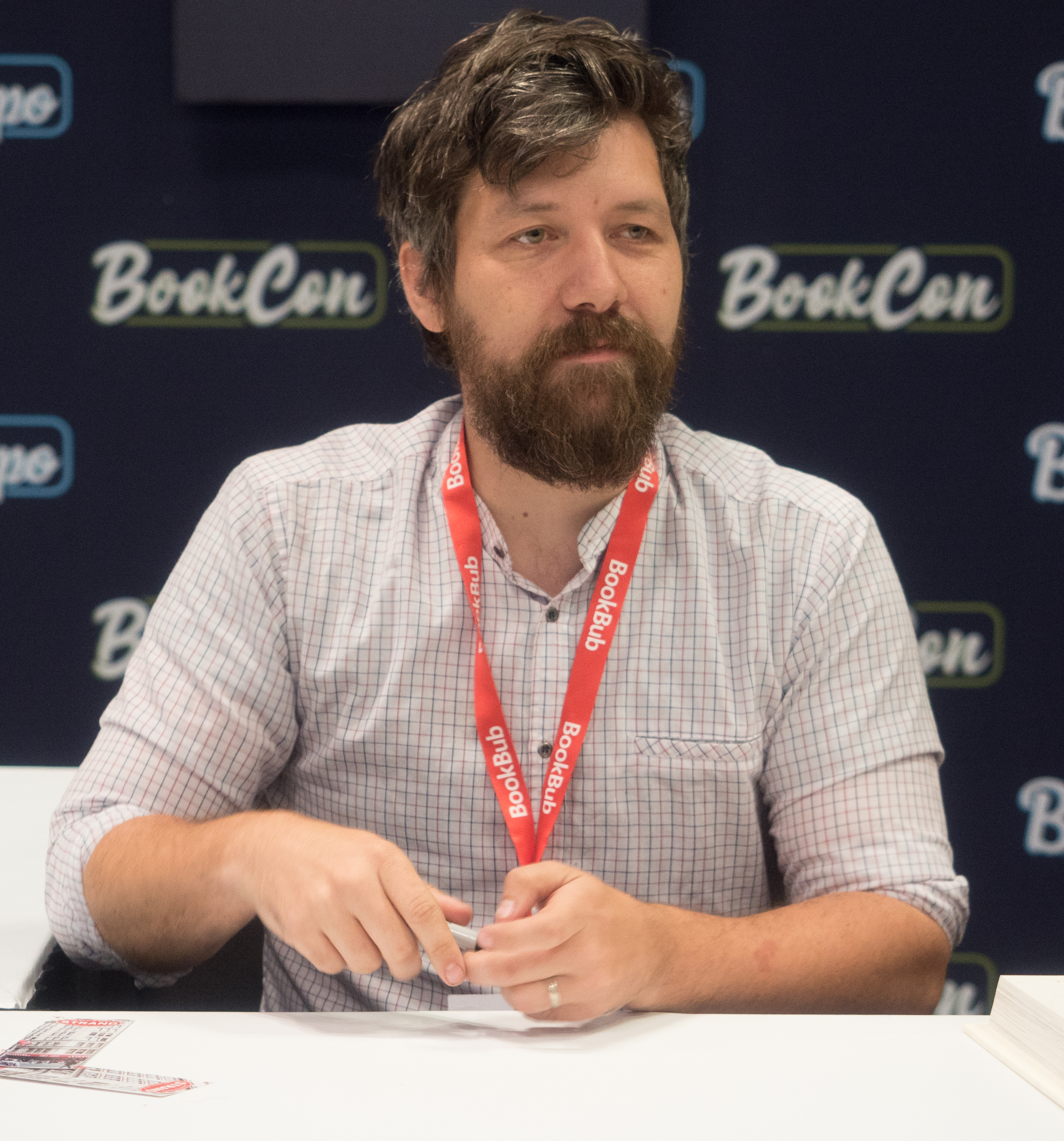
Co-founder Dylan Thuras at BookCon in June 2019

Thuras and Foer met in 2007, and soon discussed ideas for a different kind of atlas, featuring places not commonly found in guidebooks. They hired a web designer in 2008 and launched Atlas Obscura in 2009. Annetta Black was the site's first senior editor.

In 2010, the site organized the first of the international events known as Obscura Day. Thuras has stated that one of the site's main goals is "Creating a real-world community who are engaging with us, each other and these places and getting away from their computers to actually see them." As of 2021, Atlas Obscura has originated Atlas Obscura Societies organizing local experiences in nine cities, including New York, Philadelphia, Washington D.C., Chicago, Denver, Los Angeles, and Seattle. Eliza Swann has also taught an online course on alchemy and related practices through Atlas Obscura.

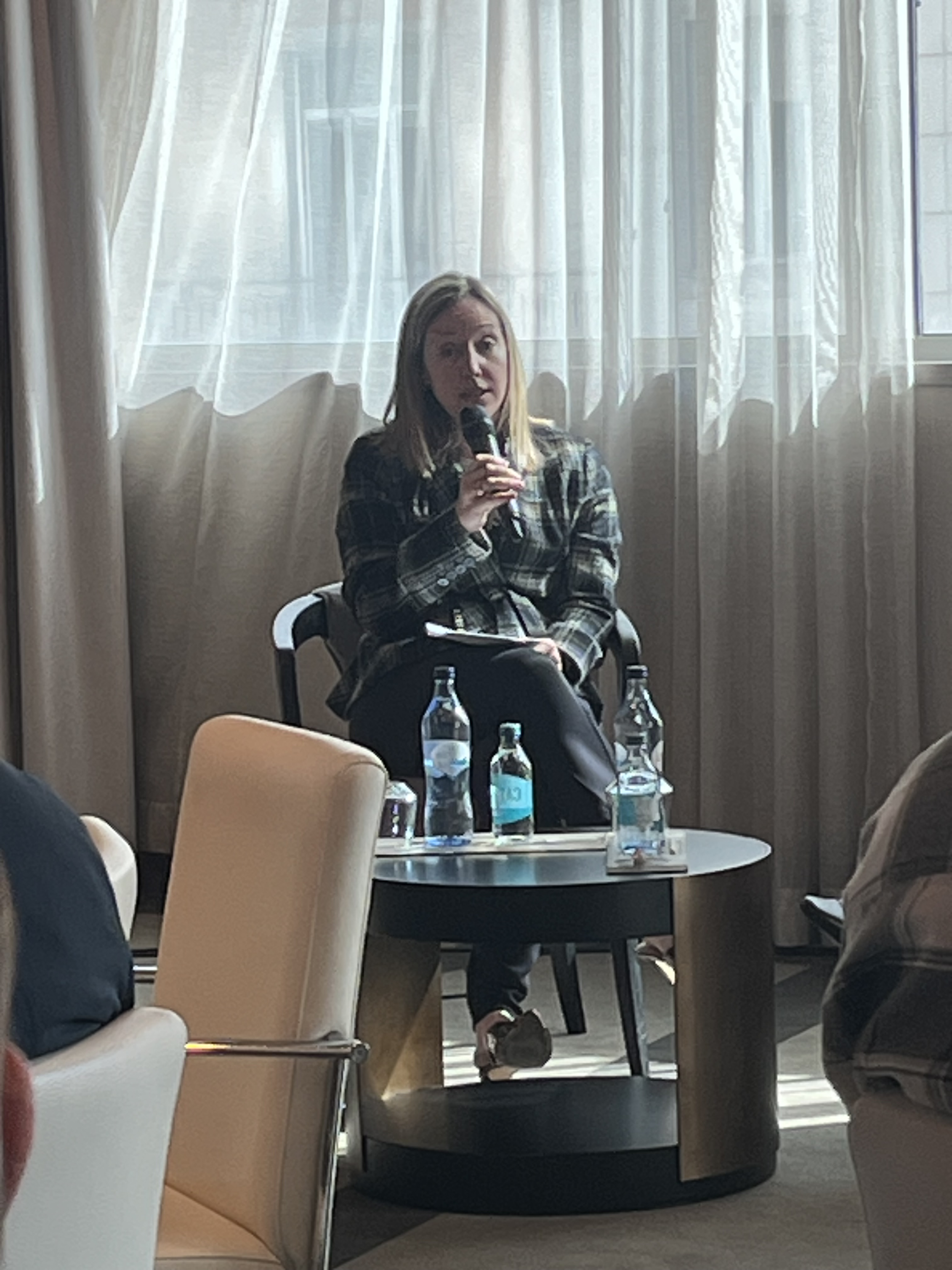
Louise Story, CEO of Atlas Obscura speaking at an event in Lisbon, Portugal in March 2026

Sommer Mathis (formerly of The Atlantic's CityLab) was the site's editor-in-chief from 2017 to 2020. She was succeeded by Samir Patel, formerly of Archaeology magazine, who became the site's editorial director in 2020 and editor-in-chief in 2021.

In October 2014, Atlas Obscura hired journalist David Plotz as its CEO. David Plotz was the site's CEO for five years (October 2014 – November 2019). Warren Webster, former president and CEO of digital publisher Coveteur, and co-founder of website Patch, assumed the position in March 2020.

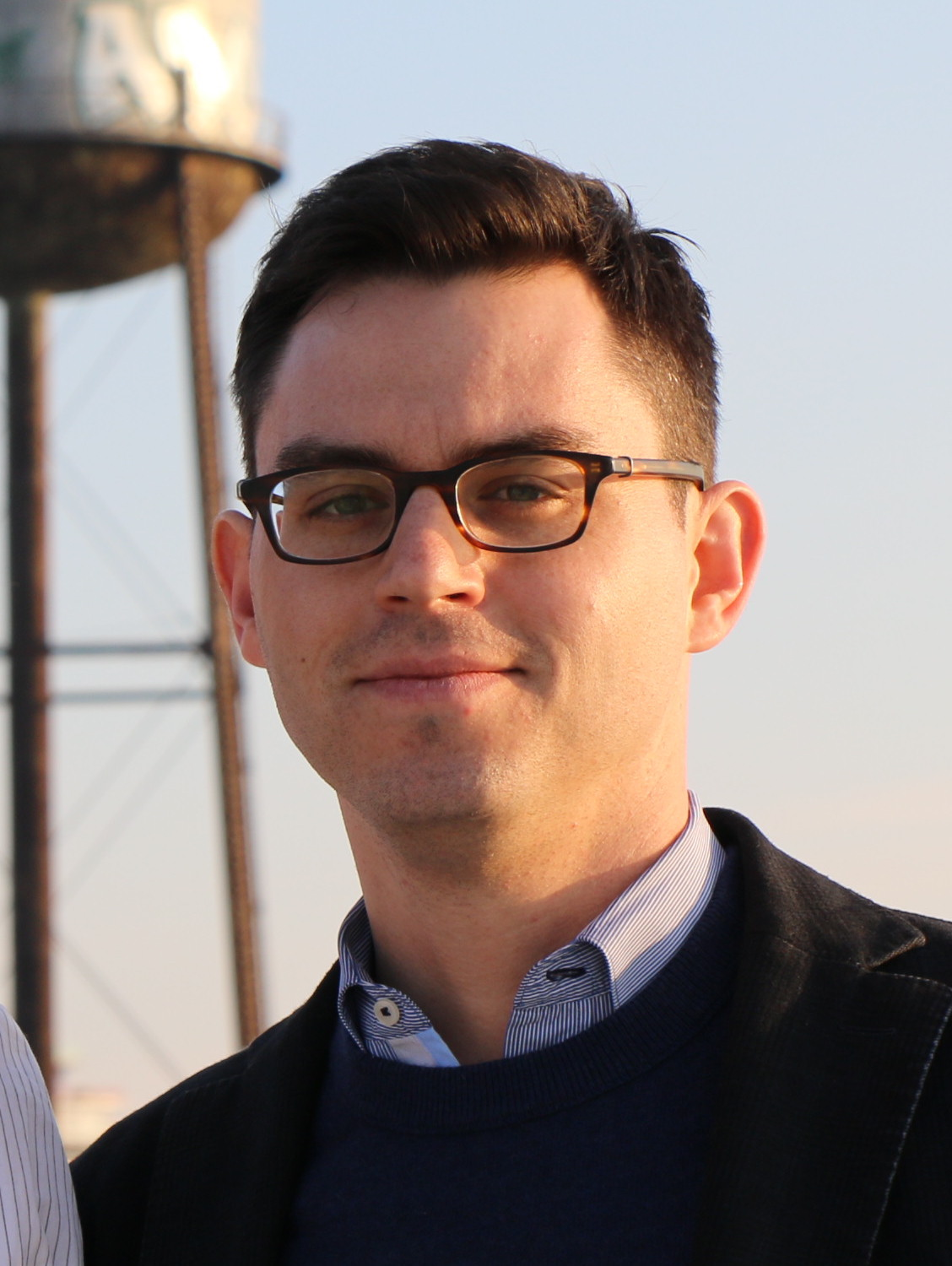
Co-founder Joshua Foer in 2013

In 2015, Atlas Obscura raised its first round of major funding, securing $2 million from a range of investors and angels including The New York Times.

In September 2016, the company published its first book, Atlas Obscura: An Explorer's Guide to the World's Hidden Wonders written by Foer, Thuras, and Ella Morton under Workman Publishing Company.

Following a second fundraising effort that netted $7.5 million, in late 2017 the site launched Gastro Obscura, a food section covering "the distinctive food locations of the world."

In 2019, Series B funding round raised $20 million from investors like Airbnb (lead investor), A+E Networks and New Atlantic Ventures.

In April 2025, Louise Story was announced as their CEO. In November, after disagreements with Story's direction for the company, Foer and Thuras were removed from the company board by shareholder vote.

== Publications ==
- Joshua Foer, Ella Morton, and Dylan Thuras, Atlas Obscura: An Explorer's Guide to the World's Hidden Wonders, Workman Publishing Company, 2016
- Dylan Thuras, Rosemary Mosco, and Joy Ang, The Atlas Obscura Explorer's Guide for the World's Most Adventurous Kid, Workman Publishing Company, 2018
- Cecily Wong and Dylan Thuras, Gastro Obscura: A Food Adventurer's Guide, Workman Publishing Company, ISBN 978-1523502196, 2021
- Dylan Thuras, Atlas Obscura Explorer's Journal: Let Your Curiosity Be Your Compass, Workman Publishing Company, ISBN 978-1523501731, 2017
- Atlas Obscura Page-A-Day Calendar 2023: 365 Days of Extraordinary Destinations, Bizarre Phenomena, and Other Hidden Wonders, Workman Publishing Company, ISBN 978-1523516520, 2022
- Wild Life: An Explorer's Guide to the World's Living Wonders. Workman Publishing Company, ISBN 978-1523514410, 2024
