= Sofar Sounds =

British live music event company

- Industry: Music
- Founded: 2009; 17 years ago
- Founder: Rocky Start, Rafe Offer, Dave Alexander
- Headquarters: London, United Kingdom
- Area served: Worldwide, over 350 cities
- Key people: Warren Webster (CEO); Rafe Offer (Executive Chairman)
- Website: https://www.sofarsounds.com

Sofar Sounds is a company that organizes live events Founded in 2009, the company has its headquarters in London, with chapters in more than 300 cities.

== History ==
Sofar Sounds was founded in London in March 2009 by Rafe Offer, Rocky Start, and Dave Alexander. The concept originated when Rafe Offer invited eight friends to Alexander's flat in North London to watch him perform. The second event, and first to be ticketed, also took place in London. The company expanded to major cities such as Paris, New York City, and Los Angeles in early 2011.

Jim Lucchese became the CEO of Sofar Sounds in February 2019.

In May 2019, the company raised $25 million from Battery Ventures and Union Square Ventures, adding to the $6 million previously raised from Octopus Ventures and Virgin Group. As of November 2019, the company had hosted over 22,000 performances.

In 2019, Sofar Sounds announced the creation of Sofar Crew, comprising part-time employees hired to work alongside Sofar Ambassadors.

The company was investigated in 2019 by the New York Department of Labor regarding its use of unpaid labor. This investigation concluded in a settlement in which the company agreed to stop using volunteer workers within their business model. In 2020, New York State Department of Labor Commissioner Roberta Reardon said "Worker protection is at the forefront of our mission at the Department of Labor...In this case, SoFar (sic) made our job much easier because they wanted to be a partner and a good corporate citizen....SoFar (sic) Sounds fully cooperated with the investigation and corrected that mistake. They have taken swift steps to change their business practices, and they are fully compensating their employees. I consider this a win for everybody!"

In March 2020, Sofar suspended all shows due to the international coronavirus pandemic. The company reportedly compensated all artists for cancelled performances, worked to reschedule them, and created a Global Artist Fund with a goal of $250,000 for live music relief. At the end of March 2020, the company launched a daily livestream to support independent artists during the pandemic, allowing viewers to donate directly to artists or to the Global Artist Fund.

== Events ==
Typically, three artists perform at each Sofar gig without a dedicated opener or headliner, providing a similar opportunity for all featured artists. Musicians of any genre can apply to perform via a form on the website.

Attendance is managed via a guest list system communicated by email, with exact locations shared close to showtime and artist lineups revealed only at the event. Many events operate under a BYOB-style etiquette and emphasize arriving on time, staying to the end, and attentive listening without phones or other distractions.

Artists’ performances are often filmed, with edited videos uploaded to the official Sofar Sounds YouTube channel and shared on the website.

== Operating model ==
Sofar operates through a mix of company-run cities and ambassador-run locations, with many ambassador teams organizing roughly one or two shows per month in their markets.

By 2019–2020, the organization reported a global footprint spanning hundreds of cities, reflecting a distributed model that scales intimate shows across multiple markets.

For company‑operated shows, tickets are sold online in advance and artists are paid a flat guarantee with higher payment tiers based on ticket sales, reflecting a standardized compensation framework introduced in recent years. Earlier volunteer/ambassador contexts commonly relied on a donation (“pass‑the‑hat”) approach, with three artists performing short sets per show, a format documented in reporting on the model’s evolution.

As tools and processes have formalized, artists can also navigate bookings, dates, and resources through Sofar’s online artist resources and application pathways tied to specific cities and timeframes.

== Notable partnerships and performers ==
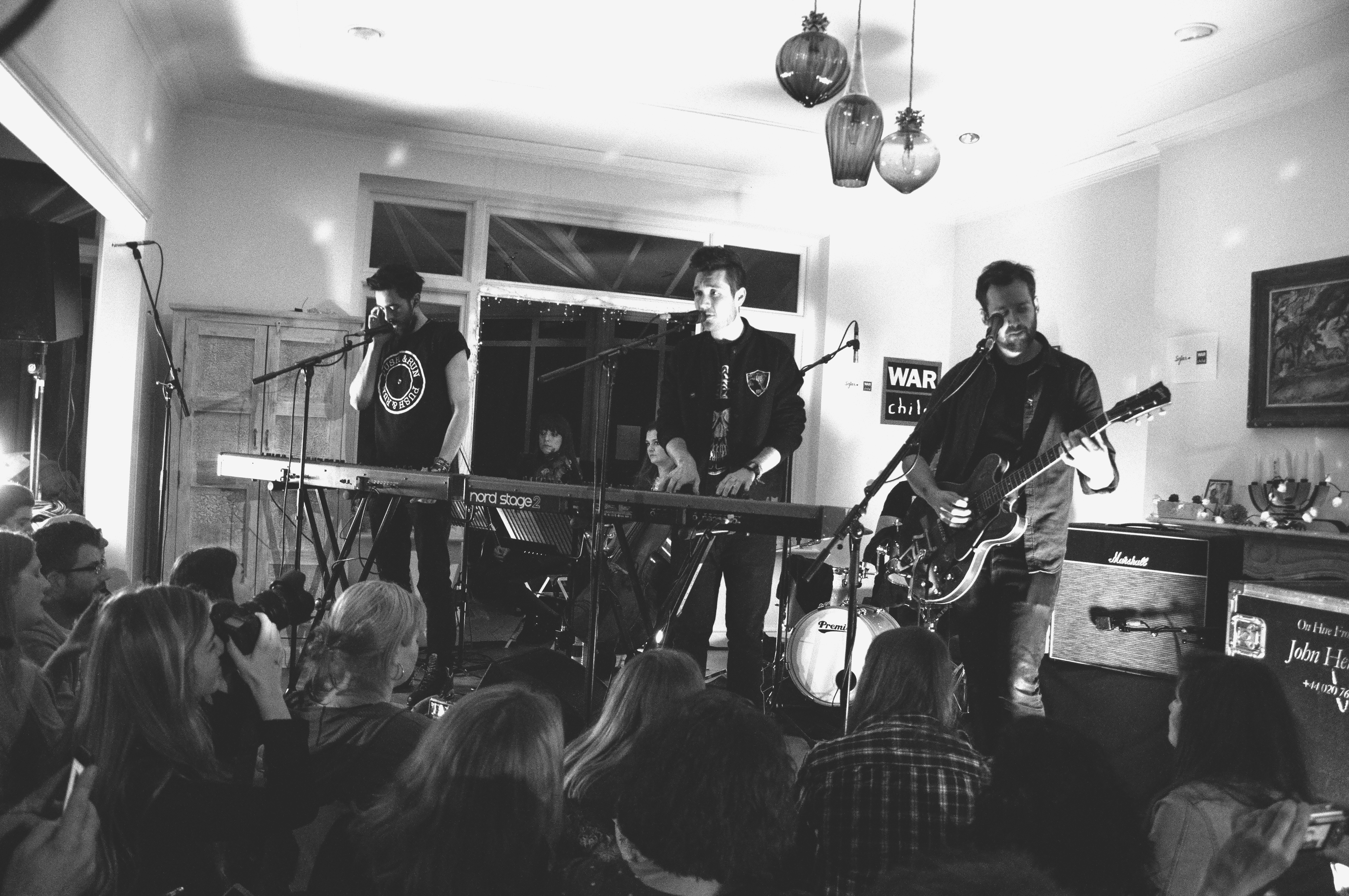
Bastille performing at the Sofar Sounds x War Child charity event in London.

In June 2015, Sofar Sounds partnered with Uber to host a series of secret gigs in London.

In July 2016, it was announced that Virgin Group’s Sir Richard Branson would invest in Sofar Sounds.

In March 2017, a partnership was announced with Airbnb for their new Music Experiences format, enabling Airbnb customers in San Francisco to reserve seats at a Sofar event via the Trips platform.

UK and Irish acts who have performed at Sofar shows include James Bay, Hozier, Emeli Sandé, Will Young, Tom Odell, actor Robert Pattinson, Wolf Alice, Bastille, and Lianne La Havas. Bastille also participated in a special live-streamed Sofar Sounds #Voting show held in London in June 2016 to encourage voting in the EU referendum. Other London performers include Lucy Rose, The Staves and Kae Tempest. In 2013, Robert Pattinson performed at an event.

US performers who have appeared in Sofar concerts include Giselle Bellas, Leon Bridges, Fantastic Negrito, Saba, Yeasayer, and Yeah Yeah Yeahs frontwoman Karen O, while acts such as Núria Graham and Ali Somay have played Sofar Barcelona and Sofar Istanbul, respectively.

The local Sofar Sounds branch in Los Angeles teamed up with the charity Movember for a Giving Tuesday event, while the New York City branch previously organized a gig in aid of Planned Parenthood.

On 20 June 2017, World Refugee Day, Sofar Sounds announced a global event series called ‘Give a Home’, in partnership with Amnesty International. ‘Give a Home’ took place on 20 September 2017, featuring thousands of performances in over 300 cities and 60 countries, in aid of refugees. Confirmed artists included Ed Sheeran, Moby, Mashrou' Leila, among others.

At the 2017 Grammy Awards, several nominees, including Leon Bridges, Fantastic Negrito and Saba, had previously played Sofar locations.
