= Farnham Creek =

Stream in Minnesota, U.S.

Coordinates: 46°30′8″N 94°47′48″W

Farnham Creek is a stream in the U.S. state of Minnesota. It is a tributary to the Crow Wing River.

Farnham Creek was named for Summer W. Farnham, a businessperson in the lumber industry and state legislator.

The creek is managed under the Crow Wing River Watershed Restoration and Protection Strategy.

== See also ==
- List of rivers of Minnesota
