= Brian Farnham =

American journalist

- Born: September 14, 1971 (age 54)
- Education: Bowdoin College (BA); Columbia University (MFA)
- Occupations: Journalist, editor

Brian Farnham (born September 14, 1971) is an American journalist. He is the current Executive Editor of Zagat.com and former editor in chief of Patch. He is also the former editor in chief of Time Out New York.

== Early life ==
Farnham grew up in New York City and graduated with an A.B. from Bowdoin College and an MFA from Columbia University.

== Career ==
Farnham was a fact-checker and writer for New York. One year later, he joined Sidewalk.com, Microsoft's online city guide, to write movie and tech reviews and to edit the book review section. He was a freelance journalist for New York publications and wrote a book about iWon.com, a site that received $100 million in funding from CBS. In 2000, he became an associate editor for Details and was promoted to deputy editor in 2004. He was named editor in chief of TimeOut New York in 2006. In his short term as editor (2006–2008), Farnham saw the median age of magazine subscribers decline from 38 years to 22.8 years and their average income decline from $103,000 a year to $93,000 per year. Additionally, Farnham had stirred controversy when he stated about TimeOut's 2007 sex issue, "If you do a sex issue and no one cancels, you're not doing your job."

On January 29, 2008, Farnham announced that he was resigning his post at TimeOut to his deputy editor, Michael Freidson, to found an internet start-up magazine. He served as lead editor at Patch until 2012.

In April 2012, Farnham announced he was leaving Patch voluntarily the following month. In October 2013, Farnham announced he was joining Zagat.com as executive editor.
