= Farnam, Iran =

Farnam فرنام
- Village
- Location within Iran
- Coordinates: 33°30′03″N 49°56′56″E
- Country: Iran
- Province: Markazi
- County: Khomeyn
- Bakhsh: Central
- Rural District: Rostaq

Population (2006)
  - Total: 92
- Time zone: UTC+3:30 (IRST)
  - Summer (DST): UTC+4:30 (IRDT)

Farnam (Persian: فرنام, also Romanized as Farnām; also known as Farnāb) is a village in Rostaq Rural District, in the Central District of Khomeyn County, Markazi Province, Iran. At the 2006 census, its population was 92, in 19 families.
