= Louise Whitman Farnam =

American physician

Louise Whitman Farnam (1890–1949) was an American physician. She graduated from Vassar College in 1912 and earned a PhD in physiological chemistry from Yale University in 1916. That same year she was among the first 3 women admitted to the Yale School of Medicine. Based on alphabetical order, Farnam is considered the first woman to be admitted. She graduated in 1920 with honors, won the Campbell Gold Prize for the highest rank in examinations, and was selected as commencement speaker.

She is best known for her work as a faculty member of the Hunan-Yale Hospital and the Hunan-Yale College of Medicine in Changsha from 1921–1933, during part of the Chinese Civil War. Today, a Cluster at Yale Center for Research Computing is named for her.
