= Farnham Lake =

Lake in the state of Minnesota, United States

- Location within Minnesota
- Location: Cass and Wadena County, Minnesota
- Coordinates: 46°30′27″N 94°46′42″W
- Type: lake

Farnham Lake is a lake in the U.S. state of Minnesota.

Farnham Lake was named for Summer W. Farnham, a businessperson in the lumber industry and state legislator.

== See also ==
- List of lakes in Minnesota
