= Fay Farnum =

American mathematician (1888-1977)

- Born: Eugenia Fae Farnum; August 24, 1888; Spencer, Iowa
- Died: March 11, 1977 (aged 88); Tucson, Arizona
- Burial place: Tucson Memorial Park South Lawn
- Education: Iowa State University; Cornell University
- Occupations: Mathematician, professor
- Known for: Founding member of the Mathematical Association of America

Fay Farnum (August 24, 1888, in Spencer, Iowa – March 11, 1977, in Tucson, Arizona) was an American mathematician and university professor and one of the few women to earn a PhD in mathematics before World War II. She was a founding member of the Mathematical Association of America.

== Life and work ==
Born Eugenia Fae Farnum, the second of four children to Josephine and farmer George Edwin Farnum, Fay Farnum received her bachelor's degree in general science from the Iowa State College of Agriculture and Mechanic Arts (now Iowa State University) in 1909. After teaching at various schools in Lyons, Iowa, Le Mars, Iowa, and Ames, Iowa, she moved to Ithaca, New York and received a master's degree from Cornell University in 1915 using the name "Fae Farnum" (but sometime before 1920, she began calling herself Fay Farnum exclusively).

Farnum returned as an instructor to Iowa State College between 1915 and 1924. She spent two summer semesters in Chicago before enrolling as a graduate student at Cornell University from 1924 to 1926. Between 1925 and 1926, she taught two classes each semester including solid geometry, advanced algebra and calculus. She received her Ph.D. in 1926 under the supervision of mathematician Virgil Snyder with her dissertation: On Triadic Cremona Nets of Plane Curves. Her major subject was geometry with her first minor in mathematical analysis and her second minor in physics.

She started teaching at Washington Square College (now New York University) in 1926 and stayed there for several years, first as an instructor and later as an assistant professor. During the 1939–1940 school year, Farnum took a leave of absence from NYU to attend the Physics and Mathematics Institute in Copenhagen, Denmark, but in April 1940, troops from Nazi, Germany, invaded Denmark during World War II, requiring her to cut short her studies and return to her position at NYU.

In 1943, she moved to Iowa State where she taught until 1949 because the math department needed help meeting the demands of the new Army and Navy students. She was hired as an assistant professor. She retired the first time in 1949, but later, in 1955, she began teaching at the University of Arizona where she remained until 1957.

Farnum was a founding member of the Mathematical Association of America and also a member of the American Mathematical Society.

She died in Tucson in 1977 at the age of 88 and was buried at Tucson Memorial Park South Lawn.
