= Ruth Stanley Farnam =

American nurse, soldier and writer

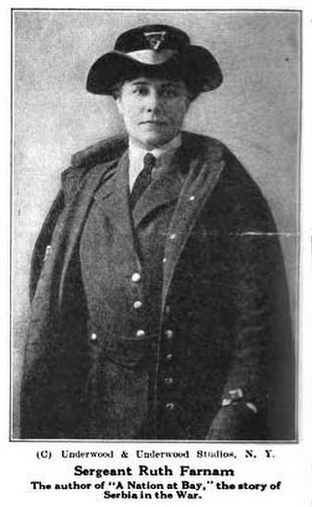
- Ruth Farnam, from a 1919 publication.
- Born: September 11, 1873; Patchogue
- Died: December 7, 1956 (aged 83)
- Occupation: Soldier, nurse, writer
- Spouse(s): Charles Henry Farnam, Raymond de Luze
- Awards: Order of St. Sava

Signature
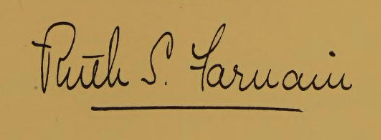

Ruth Stanley Farnam (September 11, 1873 – December 7, 1956) was an American soldier and writer. She fought as a soldier in the Serbian army during World War I.

== Family ==
Ruth Stanley Farnam was born at Patchogue, New York, the daughter of William Henry Stanley and Ida Jay Overton Stanley. She married Charles Henry Farnam and later, Baron Raymond de Luze. She went by the name of Baroness de Luze until her death in 1956.

== War work ==
She originally served as a volunteer nurse in a medical unit attached to the Serbian army. She was present during the Battle of Brod on October 11, 1916 and, when a soldier asked if she was afraid, answered: "Do you think I am scared? I have never lived before". After this, she was allowed to enlist in the Serbian army as a volunteer soldier. She was decorated three times by the King of Serbia.

In 1918, she published her autobiography, A Nation at Bay: What an American Woman Saw and Did in Suffering Serbia. She died in 1956, aged 83 years.

== See also ==
- Viktoria Savs
