= Leesylvania State Park =

State park in Prince William County, Virginia

- IUCN category V (protected landscape/seascape)
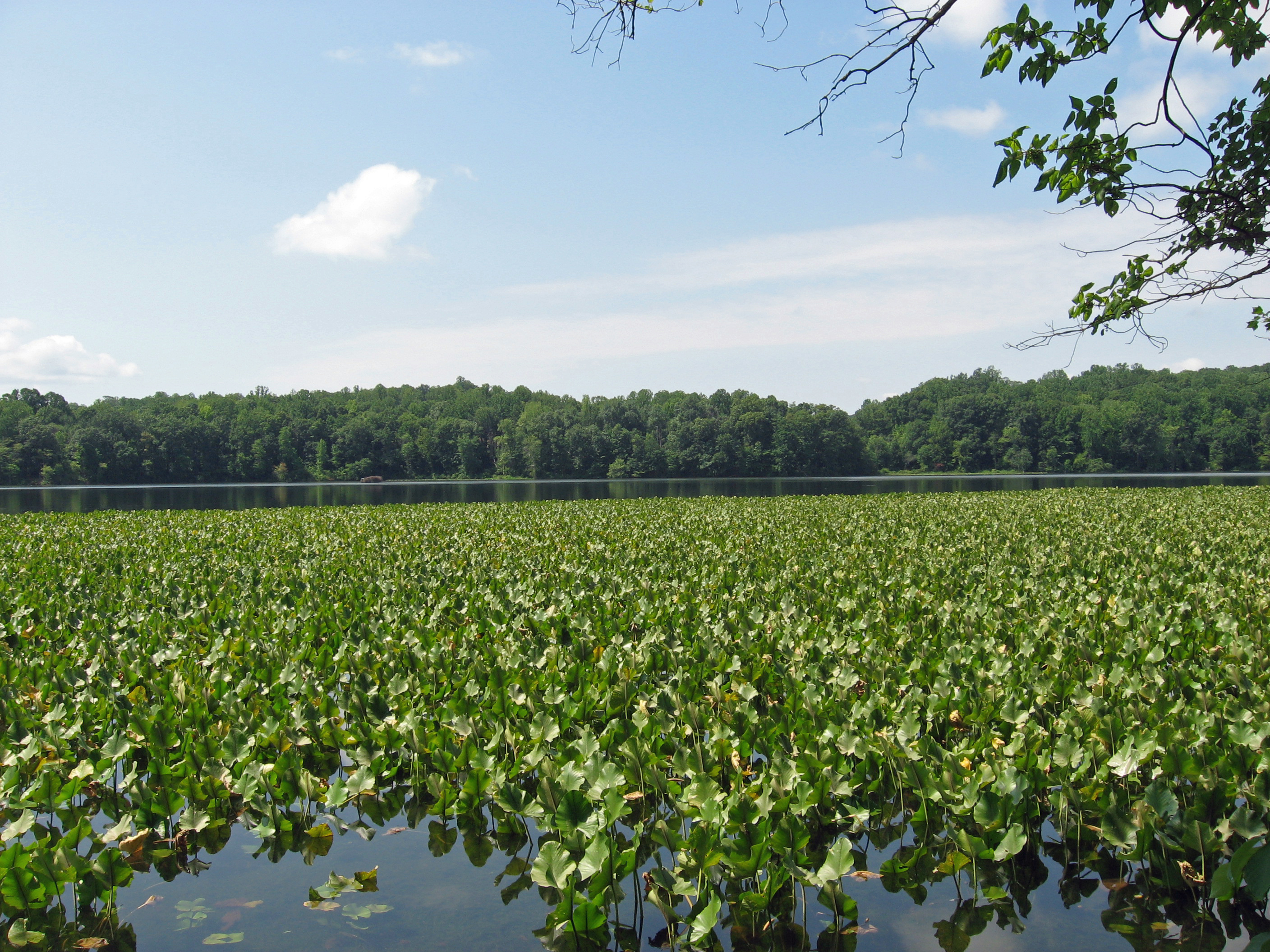
- Leesylvania State Park
- Interactive map of Leesylvania State Park
- Location: Prince William, Virginia, United States
- Area: 542 acres (219 ha)
- Elevation: 0 ft (0 m)
- Established: 1978
- Operator: Virginia Department of Conservation and Recreation
- Leesylvania Archeological Site (44PW7)
- U.S. National Register of Historic Places
- Virginia Landmarks Register
- Location within Northern Virginia Location within Virginia Location within the United States
- Nearest city: Dumfries, Virginia
- Coordinates: 38.5896077°N 77.2585091°W
- Area: 1.5 acres (0.61 ha)
- NRHP reference No.: 84003565
- VLR No.: 076-0045

Significant dates
- Added to NRHP: September 13, 1984
- Designated VLR: June 19, 1984

Leesylvania State Park is located in the southeastern part of Prince William County, Virginia. The land was donated in 1978 by businessman Daniel K. Ludwig, and the park was dedicated in 1985 and opened full-time in 1992.

== History ==
At the time of early English settlers, Leesylvania was believed to be the site of an Algonquian village, overlooking Neabsco Creek.

=== 18th century ===
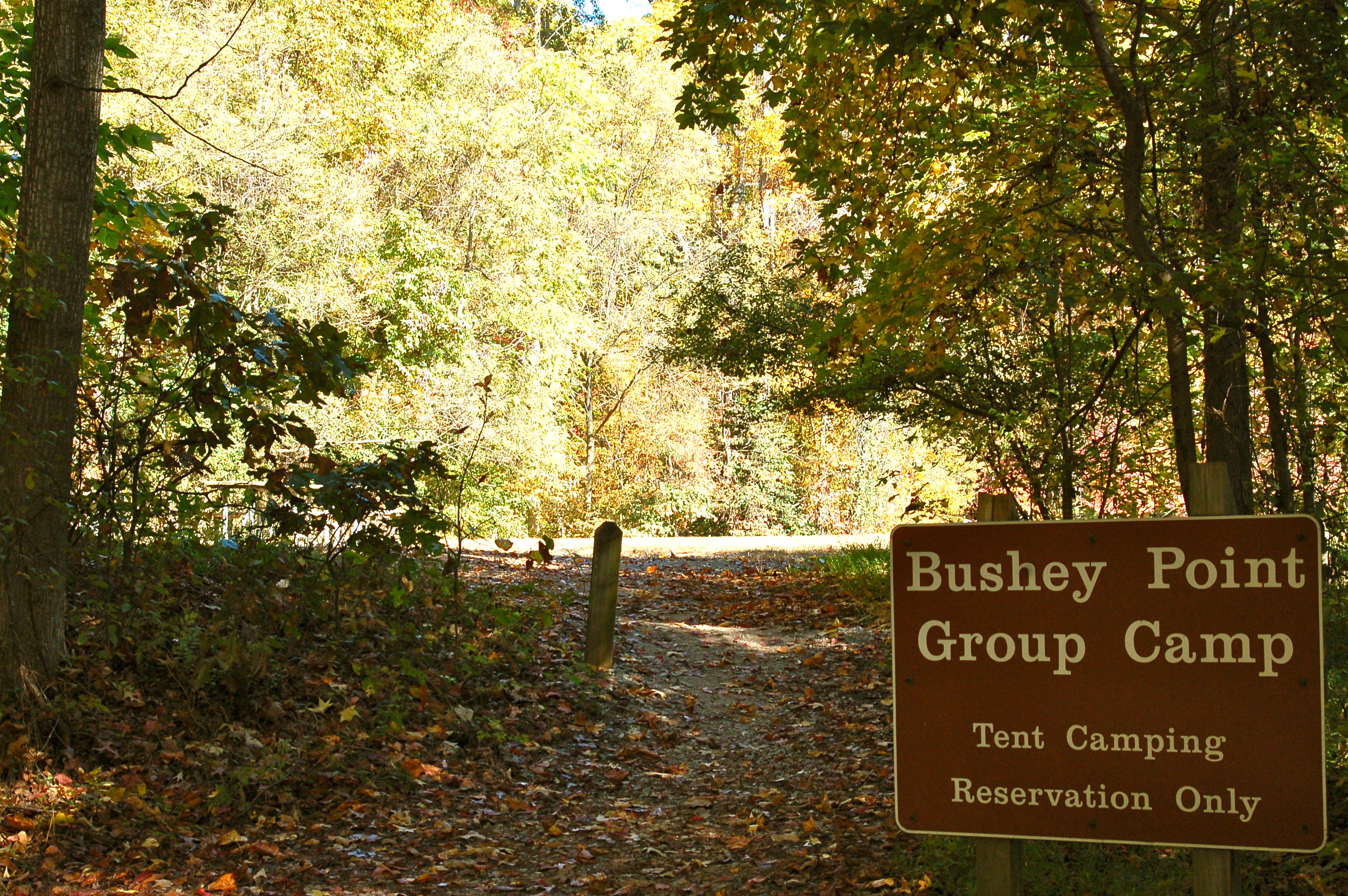
Bushey Point Group Camp.

Henry Lee II, of the Lee Family of Virginia, settled on the land from 1747 until his death in 1787. He and his wife had eight children at their home, including Revolutionary War hero Henry "Light Horse Harry" Lee. He is also the grandfather to Civil War general Robert E. Lee. George Washington mentions visiting the Lee House three times in his diaries.

=== American Civil War ===
In 1825, the property was sold to Henry Fairfax, and in 1847 passed to his son John Fairfax. John Fairfax continued to farm the plantation using enslaved labor, and during the American Civil War served as a staff aide to Confederate Lt. General James Longstreet.

Early in the conflict, a small Confederate force operated a gun emplacement overlooking the Potomac River, the most northern and smallest of four Potomac batteries that in effect blockaded commercial shipping from landing in Washington during the first year of the conflict, before federal troops occupied the area.

=== Post-civil war era ===
After the conflict, John Fairfax returned to live on the property in late 1875, remaining there until his death in 1908.

The Freestone Point Confederate Battery was listed on the National Register of Historic Places in 1989. The battery engaged with vessels of the US Navy's Potomac Flotilla on September 25, 1861. There were no casualties on either side, but the Federal vessels withdrew at the conclusion of the fighting.

=== Modern era ===
Today, only a small cornerstone of the Lee House remains. The house and its path were completely bulldozed in the 1950s to make way for a road, when increasing river pollution led to precipitous decline in both ducks and fish, and thus closure of both a hunting club and a commercial fishery on the site, and promoters established a pier for access to a gambling boat on the Potomac River on the Maryland side (which permitted access to gambling that was illegal in Virginia).

A restored chimney of the Fairfax House remains. Henry Lee II and his wife, along with Henry Fairfax and his third wife are buried in a small cemetery nearby. All five sites are accessible by trail. The Leesylvania Archeological Site was listed on the National Register of Historic Places in 1984.

== Recreation ==
The park has a small group-only campground, five hiking trails, fishing pier, boat ramp, visitor center, natural sand beach, and four picnic shelters.

== See also ==
- List of Virginia state parks
