= Patch Media =

U.S. local news website, launched 2007

- Website type: News
- Headquarters: New York City
- Area served: United States
- Owner: Hale Global
- CEO: Charles Hale
- Services: Online news and opinion
- Website: patch.com
- Launched: December 2007; 18 years ago
- Current status: Active

Patch Media operates Patch.com, an American local news and information platform, based in Manhattan. It is primarily owned by Hale Global. Patch is operated by Planck, LLC, doing business as Patch Media.

As of May 2024, the Patch.com hyperlocal websites provide local news and human interest stories to 1,900 communities, dispersed across all 50 U.S. states, Washington, D.C. and the United States Virgin Islands. The platform is based on a lead reporter in each community, does not offer international news, but does have an "Across America" site, with national stories.

Patch also provides a platform for users to post questions, news tips and columns germane to their towns. Each site also contains a mixture of local and national advertising. The latter includes a self-serve ad platform allowing users to communicate directly with targeted audiences.

== History ==
Patch was founded by then-president of Google Americas operations Tim Armstrong, Warren Webster and Jon Brod in 2007 after Armstrong said he found a dearth of online information on his home-neighborhood of Riverside, Connecticut. AOL acquired the company in 2009 shortly after Armstrong became AOL's CEO. Armstrong told AOL staffers that he recused himself from negotiations to acquire the company and did not directly profit from his seed investment.

The acquisition occurred on June 11, 2009. AOL paid an estimated $7 million in cash for the news platform as part of its effort to reinvent itself as a content provider beyond its legacy dial-up Internet business. AOL, which split from Time Warner in late 2009, announced in 2010 it would be investing $50 million or more into the startup of the Patch.com network. As part of the acquisition Brod became President of AOL Ventures, Local & Mapping, and Warren Webster became president of Patch.

Following the acquisition, Patch began a period of rapid expansion, becoming one of the largest employers of professional journalists in the US at the time. The company grew from 46 markets to over 400 in 2010, and by early 2011 The New York Times reported that it was "finding progress where others have failed", and had grown to 800 communities. In 2011, Patch acquired hyperlocal news aggregator Outside.in from investors including Union Square Ventures and others, integrating the technology into the Patch platform.

In 2013, Patch was spun out of AOL as a joint venture with Hale Global. In January 2014, the new owners announced layoffs of 400 journalists and other employees.

In February 2016, The Wall Street Journal reported that Patch had 23 million users, was profitable, and was expanding into new territories. In 2018, Patch completed its third profitable year in a row, attracting an average of 23.5 million unique visitors monthly. Patch employs nearly 150 people, including 110 full-time reporters, many from the nation's leading newsrooms.

Alison Bernstein was named CEO in September 2019, and later transitioned to the company's board. Rob Cain, formerly of Omron Adept, became Patch's CEO in November 2020. Charles Hale informed Recode in 2019 that his network of 1,200-plus hyperlocal news sites was generating more than $20 million in annual ad revenue, without a paywall.
