= Montclair, Virginia =

- Census-designated place (CDP)
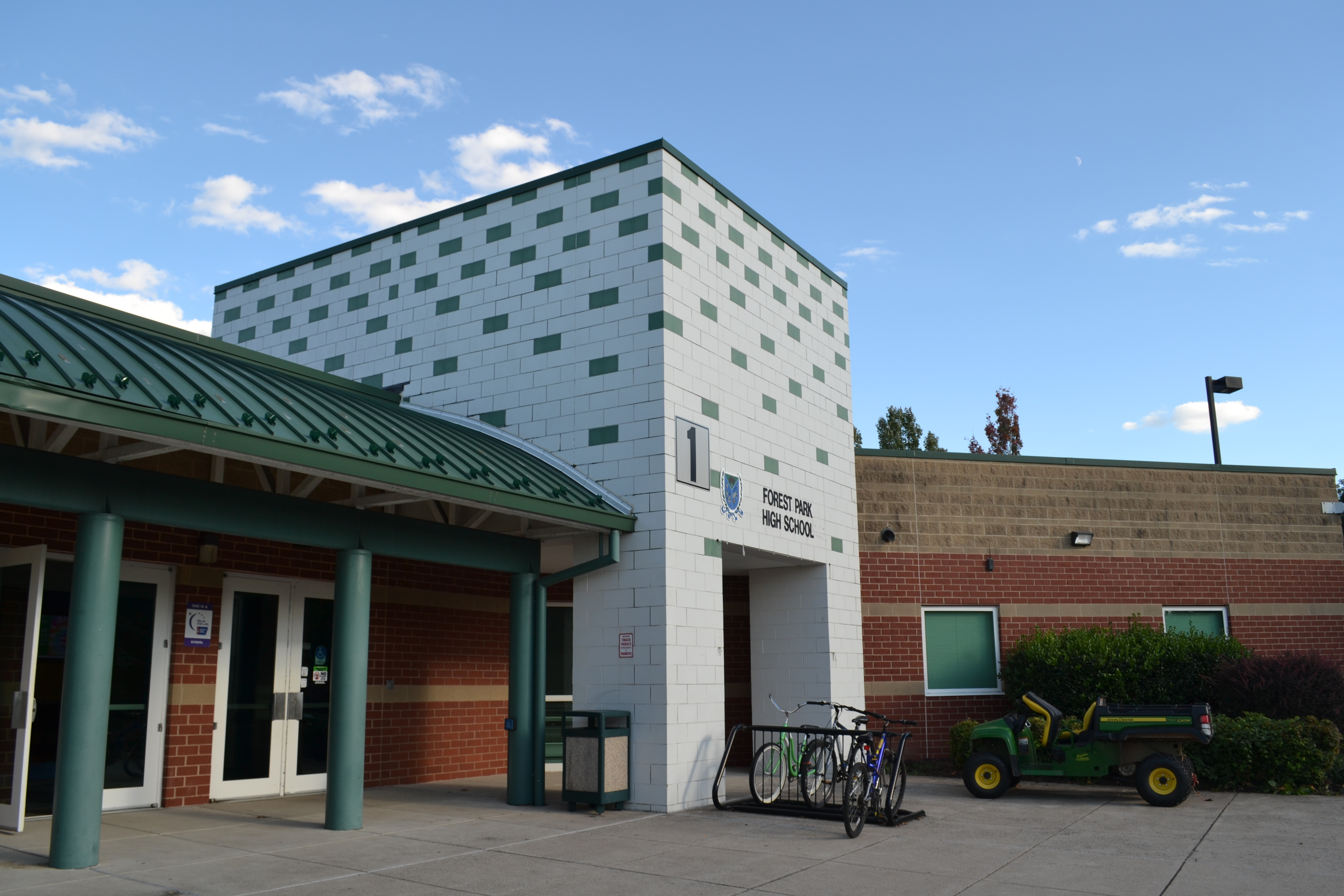
- Forest Park High School

- Location in Prince William County and the state of Virginia.
- Coordinates: 38°36′57″N 77°20′35″W
- Country: United States
- State: Virginia
- County: Prince William

Area
  - Total: 6.2 sq mi (16.0 km^{2})
  - Land: 6.0 sq mi (15.6 km^{2})
  - Water: 0.12 sq mi (0.3 km^{2})
- Elevation: 125 ft (38 m)

Population (2020)
  - Total: 22,279
  - Density: 3,700/sq mi (1,430/km^{2})
- Time zone: UTC−5 (Eastern (EST))
  - Summer (DST): UTC−4 (EDT)
- ZIP code: 22025
- Area codes: 571, 703
- FIPS code: 51-52658
- GNIS feature ID: 1867595

Montclair is a census-designated place (CDP) in Prince William County, Virginia, United States. The population was 22,279 in the 2020 census. An affluent residential community surrounding a man-made lake and golf course, development began in the late 1960s and new home construction ended during the 1990s.

== Geography ==
According to the United States Census Bureau, the CDP has a total area of 6.2 square miles (16.0 km^{2}), of which 6.0 square miles (15.6 km^{2}) is land and 0.1 square mile (0.3 km^{2}) (2.11%) is water.

== Demographics ==
=== 2020 census ===
As of the 2020 census, Montclair had a population of 22,279. The median age was 39.1 years. 25.6% of residents were under the age of 18 and 15.2% of residents were 65 years of age or older. For every 100 females there were 92.0 males, and for every 100 females age 18 and over there were 87.8 males age 18 and over.

100.0% of residents lived in urban areas, while 0.0% lived in rural areas.

There were 7,430 households in Montclair, of which 39.1% had children under the age of 18 living in them. Of all households, 64.8% were married-couple households, 9.9% were households with a male householder and no spouse or partner present, and 21.8% were households with a female householder and no spouse or partner present. About 16.4% of all households were made up of individuals and 7.4% had someone living alone who was 65 years of age or older.

There were 7,565 housing units, of which 1.8% were vacant. The homeowner vacancy rate was 0.6% and the rental vacancy rate was 2.8%.

Racial composition as of the 2020 census
| Race | Number | Percent |
|---|---|---|
| White | 11,561 | 51.9% |
| Black or African American | 4,820 | 21.6% |
| American Indian and Alaska Native | 108 | 0.5% |
| Asian | 1,865 | 8.4% |
| Native Hawaiian and Other Pacific Islander | 39 | 0.2% |
| Some other race | 1,109 | 5.0% |
| Two or more races | 2,777 | 12.5% |
| Hispanic or Latino (of any race) | 3,074 | 13.8% |

=== 2000 census ===
As of the census of 2000, there were 15,728 people, 5,084 households, and 4,326 families residing in the CDP. The population density was 2,605.0 inhabitants per square mile (1,005.8/km^{2}). There were 5,184 housing units at an average density of 858.6 per square mile (331.5/km^{2}). The racial makeup of the CDP was 77.63% White, 14.71% African American, 0.41% Native American, 3.02% Asian, 0.20% Pacific Islander, 1.08% from other races, and 2.94% from two or more races. Hispanic or Latino of any race were 4.51% of the population.

There were 5,084 households, out of which 51.0% had children under the age of 18 living with them, 72.8% were married couples living together, 9.6% had a female householder with no husband present, and 14.9% were non-families. 11.0% of all households were made up of individuals, and 1.4% had someone living alone who was 65 years of age or older. The average household size was 3.09 and the average family size was 3.35.

In the CDP, the population was spread out, with 32.4% under the age of 18, 6.9% from 18 to 24, 32.2% from 25 to 44, 25.2% from 45 to 64, and 3.4% who were 65 years of age or older. The median age was 34 years. For every 100 females, there were 96.9 males. For every 100 females age 18 and over, there were 92.7 males.

The median income for a household in the CDP was $88,496, and the median income for a family was $92,028. Males had a median income of $60,410 versus $39,255 for females. The per capita income for the CDP was $30,711. About 2.3% of families and 2.6% of the population were below the poverty line, including 3.0% of those under age 18 and 6.7% of those age 65 or over.

=== Government representation ===
Most citizens who live in Montclair are currently represented in Virginia's House of Delegates by Democrat Elizabeth Guzmán. Redistricting split the community into two districts and a small portion of Montclair is represented by Luke Torian.

== Government ==
Every year the Home Owners Association, known as MPOA (Montclair Property Owners Association), holds elections and confirms the newly elected Board at its annual meeting. MPOA governs the community making sure covenance is met, the lake is properly maintained, and the needs of the community are looked after.

== Education ==
Prince William County Public Schools is the local school district.

Forest Park High School is within the CDP boundaries; it has a Woodbridge postal address.
