= Neabsco Creek =

River in the United States of America

Coordinates: 38°36′1.43″N 77°15′25.94″W

Location
- Country: United States
- State: Virginia
- County: Prince William County

Physical characteristics
- Mouth
  - location: Potomac River
  - elevation: 0 feet (0 m)
- Length: 13.9 mi (22.4 km)

Neabsco Creek is a 13.9-mile-long (22.4 km) tributary of the lower tidal segment of the Potomac River in eastern Prince William County, Virginia. The Neabsco Creek watershed covers about 27 square miles (70 km^{2}). The name Neabsco is derived from a Doeg village recorded as Niopsco by early English colonists. The creek has served as a vital waterway for trade and commerce in northern Virginia since the eighteenth century.

The Neabsco's watershed is highly developed because of its proximity to the I-95 corridor and the Washington, D.C. metropolitan area. The EPA Office of Water recently identified the Neabsco Creek watershed as an "area of significant habitat degradation due to a loss of natural land cover and storm water management facilities designed without consideration for environmental conditions." Most of Dale City and Woodbridge empty into Neabsco Creek.

Prince William County has made significant investments to offset stormwater impacts throughout the watershed. The U.S. Army Corps of Engineers proposal to dredge Neabsco Creek to help alleviate flooding on Route 1 was never funded, and the area continues to flood on a routine basis. Congressman Tom Davis secured more than $4 million in funds to clean up the Dale Service Corporation's sewage treatment plant on Neabsco Creek.

Featherstone National Wildlife Refuge, 325 acres (1.32 km^{2}) of tidal marsh and riparian wetlands and woodlands, is located about 22 miles (35 km) south of Washington, D.C. at the confluence of Neabsco Creek and the Potomac River and provides a habitat for neotropical migrants, waterfowl, ospreys, and historically bald eagles.

Neabsco Creek was the site of Neabsco Iron Works, one of the first iron production furnace plantations in northern Virginia. It operated on the creek from 1737 to 1820 at a site just above the present-day I-95 crossing.

== See also ==
- List of rivers of Virginia
