= 1st Virginia General Assembly =

Virginia legislative term for 1776

2nd	→
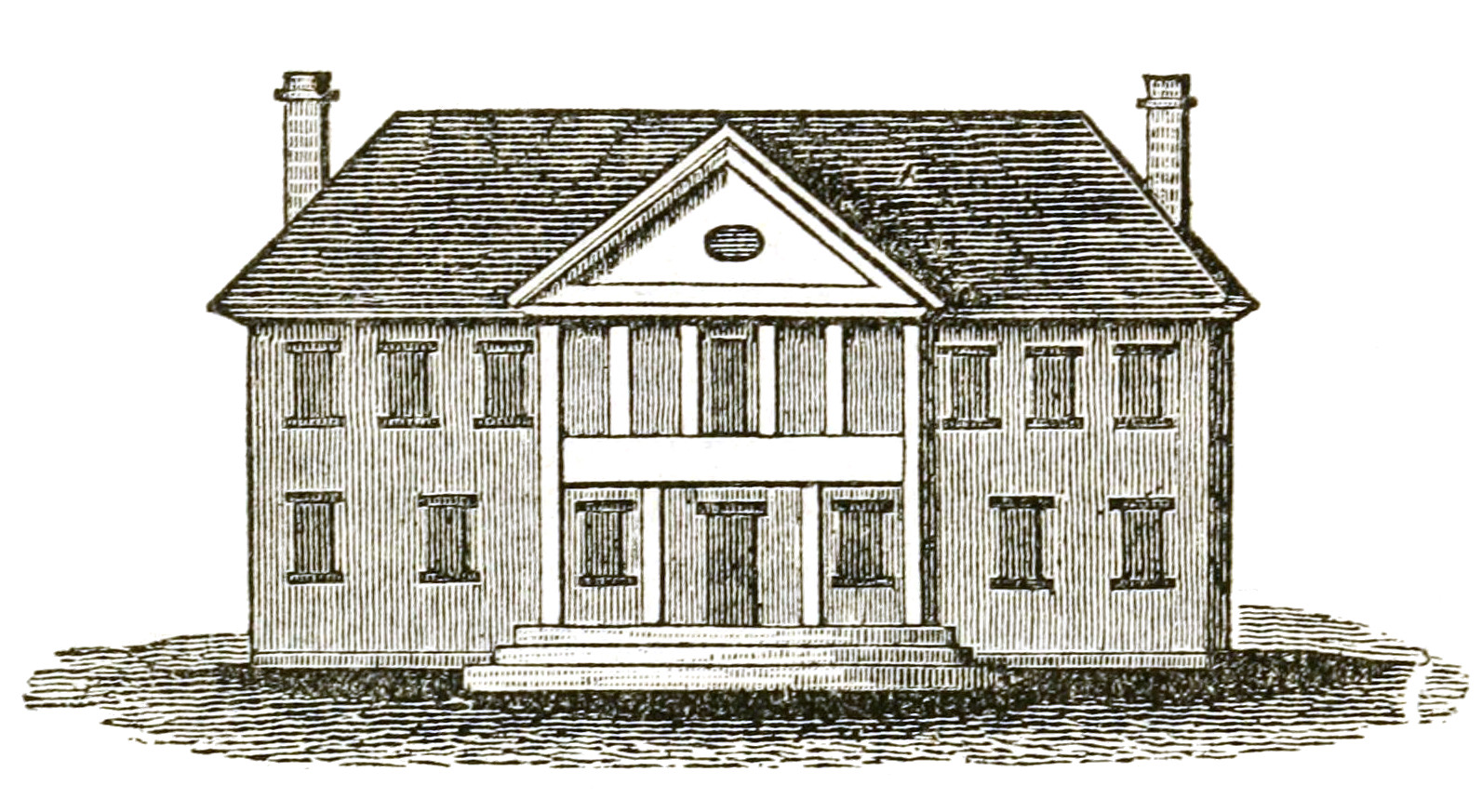
- 1845 engraving based on drawings of the second capitol at Williamsburg

Overview
- Legislative body: Virginia General Assembly
- Meeting place: Virginia Capitol, Williamsburg, Virginia
- Term: October 7, 1776 – December 21, 1776

Senate
- Members: 24
- Speaker: Archibald Cary

House of Delegates
- Members: 128
- Speaker: Edmund Pendleton

Sessions
- 1st: October 7, 1776 – December 21, 1776

The First Virginia General Assembly convened from October 7, 1776, to December 21, 1776, in regular session. This session took place while the Second Continental Congress was still in session.

== Major events ==
- December 25, 1776: George Washington lead about 2,400 soldiers across the Delaware River to launch a surprise attack on the British Army at Trenton, New Jersey.
- December 26, 1776: George Washington and his army surprised about 1,500 Hessian auxiliaries at the Battle of Trenton and took over 900 prisoners.

== Sessions ==
- 1st Regular session: October 7, 1776 – December 21, 1776

== Leaders ==
=== Senate leadership ===
- Speaker of the Senate: Archibald Cary

=== Assembly leadership ===
- Speaker of the Assembly: Edmund Pendleton

== Members ==
=== Members of the Senate ===
Members of the Senate of Virginia for the First Virginia General Assembly:

Class	Counties	Senator	Notes
1	Amelia, Chesterfield, & Cumberland	Archibald Cary	
1	Brunswick, Lunenburg, & Mecklenburg	John Jones	
1	Charles City, James City, & New Kent	John Armistead	
1	Henrico, Goochland, & Louisa	Thomas Mann	
1	Augusta & Dunmore	Sampson Mathews	
1	Lancaster, Richmond, & Northumberland	Richard Mitchell	Election was ruled invalid October 25, 1776.
2	Isle of Wight, Surry, & Prince George	Theodorick Bland	
2	Charlotte, Halifax, & Prince Edward	Paul Carrington	
2	Gloucester & Middlesex	Warner Lewis	
2	Spotsylvania, Orange, & Culpeper	Edward Stevens	
2	Loudoun & Fauquier	William Ellzey	
2	Frederick, Berkeley, & Hampshire	Robert Rutherford	
3	Dinwiddie, Southampton, & Sussex	David Mason	
3	Botetourt & Fincastle	William Christian	
3	Hanover & Caroline	Thomas Lomax	
3	Essex, King William, & King and Queen	George Brook	
3	Prince William & Fairfax	Henry Lee	
3	West Augusta	David Rogers	
4	Accomac & Northampton	Isaac Smith	
4	Princess Anne, Norfolk, & Nansemond	James Holt	
4	Buckingham, Albemarle, & Amherst	William Cabell	
4	Bedford & Pittsylvania	Edmund Winston	Election was ruled invalid October 9, 1776.
4	Elizabeth City, Warwick, & York	David Jameson	Resigned to join the Governor's privy council December 1776.
4	Westmoreland, Stafford, & King George	Thomas Ludwell Lee	

=== Members of the House of Delegates ===
Members of the Virginia House of Delegates for the First Virginia General Assembly:

County	Delegate	Notes
Accomac	Southey Simpson	
Accomac	James Henry	
Albemarle	Charles Lewis	
Albemarle	Thomas Jefferson	
Amelia	John Tabb	
Amelia	John Winn	
Amherst	Joseph Cabell	
Amherst	Gabriel Penn	
Augusta	Thomas Lewis	
Augusta	Samuel McDowell	
Bedford	John Talbot	
Bedford	Charles Lynch	
Berkeley	Philip Pendleton	
Berkeley	Thomas Hite	
Botetourt	John Bowyer	
Botetourt	Patrick Lockhart	
Brunswick	Frederick Maclin	
Brunswick	Henry Tazewell	
Buckingham	Charles Patteson	
Buckingham	John Cabell	
Caroline	Edmund Pendleton	
Caroline	James Taylor	
Charles City	William Acrill	
Charles City	Samuel Harwood	
Charles City	Benjamin Harrison	Departed during October, elected delegate to Congress.
Charlotte	Thomas Read	
Chesterfield	John Bolling	
Chesterfield	Benjamin Watkins	
Culpeper	Birkett Davenport	
Culpeper	French Strother	
Cumberland	John Mayo	
Cumberland	William Fleming	
Dinwiddie	John Banister	
Dinwiddie	Bolling Starke	
Dunmore	Abraham Bird	
Dunmore	John Tipton	
Elizabeth City	Wilson Miles Cary	
Elizabeth City	Henry King	
Essex	Meriwether Smith	
Essex	James Edmondson	
Fairfax	John West Jr.	
Fairfax	George Mason	
Fauquier	Martin Pickett	
Fauquier	James Scott	
Fincastle	Arthur Campbell	
Fincastle	William Russell	
Frederick	James Wood	
Frederick	Isaac Zane	
Gloucester	Lewis Burwell	
Gloucester	Mann Page	
Goochland	John Woodson	
Goochland	Tarlton Fleming	
Halifax	Nathaniel Terry	
Halifax	Micajah Watkins	
Hampshire	James Mercer	
Hampshire	Abraham Hite	
Hanover	Garland Anderson	
Hanover	John Syme	
Henrico	Nathaniel Wilkinson	
Henrico	Richard Adams	
Isle of Wight	John S. Wills	
Isle of Wight	Charles Fulgham	
James City	Robert C. Nicholas	
James City	William Norvell	
King and Queen	Thomas Coleman	
King and Queen	William Lyne	
King George	Joseph Jones	
King George	William Fitzhugh	
King William	Carter Braxton	
King William	Richard Squire Taylor	
Lancaster	Jesse Ball	
Lancaster	James Gordon	
Loudoun	Francis Peyton	
Loudoun	Josiah Clapham	
Louisa	George Meriwether	
Louisa	Thomas Johnson	
Lunenburg	David Garland	
Lunenburg	Lodowick Farmer	
Mecklenburg	Joseph Speed	
Mecklenburg	Bennett Goode	
Middlesex	Edmund Berkeley	
Middlesex	James Montague	
Nansemond	Willis Riddick	
Nansemond	William Cowper	
New Kent	William Clayton	
New Kent	Armistead Russell	
Norfolk	Matthew Godfrey	
Norfolk	John Wilson	
Northampton	Nathaniel L. Savage	
Northampton	George Savage	
Northumberland	Rodham Kenner	
Northumberland	John Cralle	
Orange	James Madison	
Orange	William Moore	
Pittsylvania	Benjamin Lankford	
Pittsylvania	Robert Williams	
Prince Edward	William Watts	
Prince Edward	William Booker	
Prince George	Richard Bland	Died October 26, 1776.
Prince George	Peter Poythress	Resigned due to illness October 17, 1776.
Prince George	Edmund Ruffin	
Prince William	Cuthbert Bullitt	
Prince William	Jesse Ewell	
Princess Anne	William Robinson	
Princess Anne	John Thoroughgood	
Richmond	Hudson Muse	
Richmond	Charles M. Carty	
Southampton	Edwin Gray	
Southampton	Henry Taylor	
Spotsylvania	Mann Page	
Spotsylvania	George Thornton	
Stafford	Charles Carter	
Stafford	William Brent	
Surry	Allen Cocke	
Surry	Nicholas Faulcon	
Sussex	Henry Gee	
Sussex	Gray Judkins	
Warwick	William Harwood, Jr.	
Warwick	Richard Cary	
West Augusta	John Harvie	
West Augusta	Charles Simms	
Westmoreland	Richard Henry Lee	
Westmoreland	John A. Washington	
York	Corbin Griffin	
York	William Digges	
Williamsburg	Joseph Prentis	
Norfolk Borough	William Roscow	
Norfolk Borough	Wilson Curle	

== Employees ==
- Senate Clerk: John Pendleton Jr.
- House Clerk: John Tazewell

== See also ==
- List of Virginia state legislatures
