= Fifth Virginia Convention =

Meeting of the Patriot legislature of Virginia in 1776

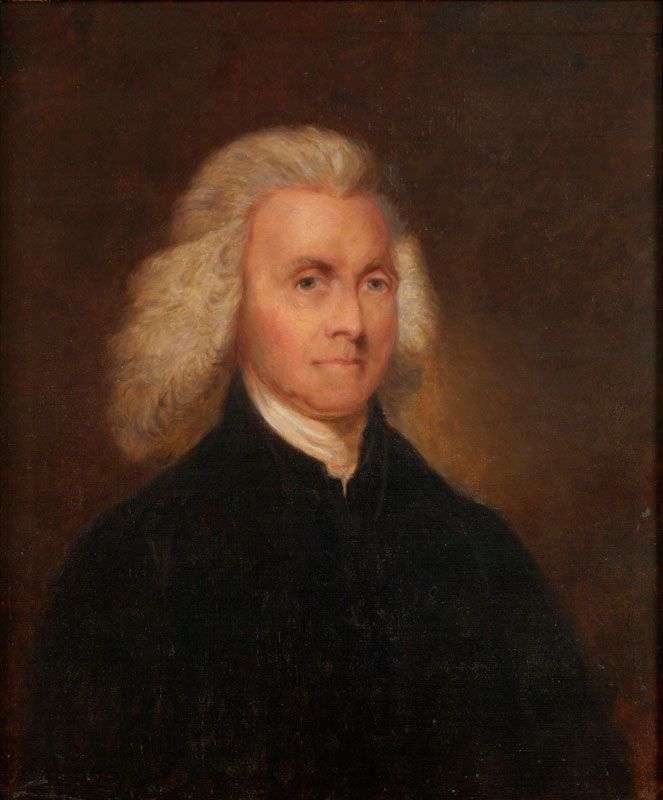
Edmund Pendleton, the presiding officer of the Fifth Virginia Convention

The Fifth Virginia Convention was a meeting of the Patriot legislature of Virginia held in Williamsburg from May 6 to July 5, 1776. This Convention declared Virginia an independent state and produced its first constitution and the Virginia Declaration of Rights.

== Background and composition ==
The previous Fourth Virginia Convention had taken place in Williamsburg, in December 1775. In Philadelphia, the Second Continental Congress appointed George Washington commander of the Continental Army troops that then surrounded Boston, and Virginia patriots defeated an advancing British force at the Battle of Great Bridge southeast of Norfolk.

The newly elected delegates to the Fifth Virginia Convention re-elected Edmund Pendleton as its president on his return from Philadelphia as presiding officer of the First Continental Congress. The membership could be thought of as belonging to one of three groups: radicals from western Virginia, who had agitated for independence from Britain even before 1775; philosophers of the American Enlightenment; and wealthy planters, largely from the east. A malapportionment of delegates granted disproportionate influence to this latter group.

== Meeting ==
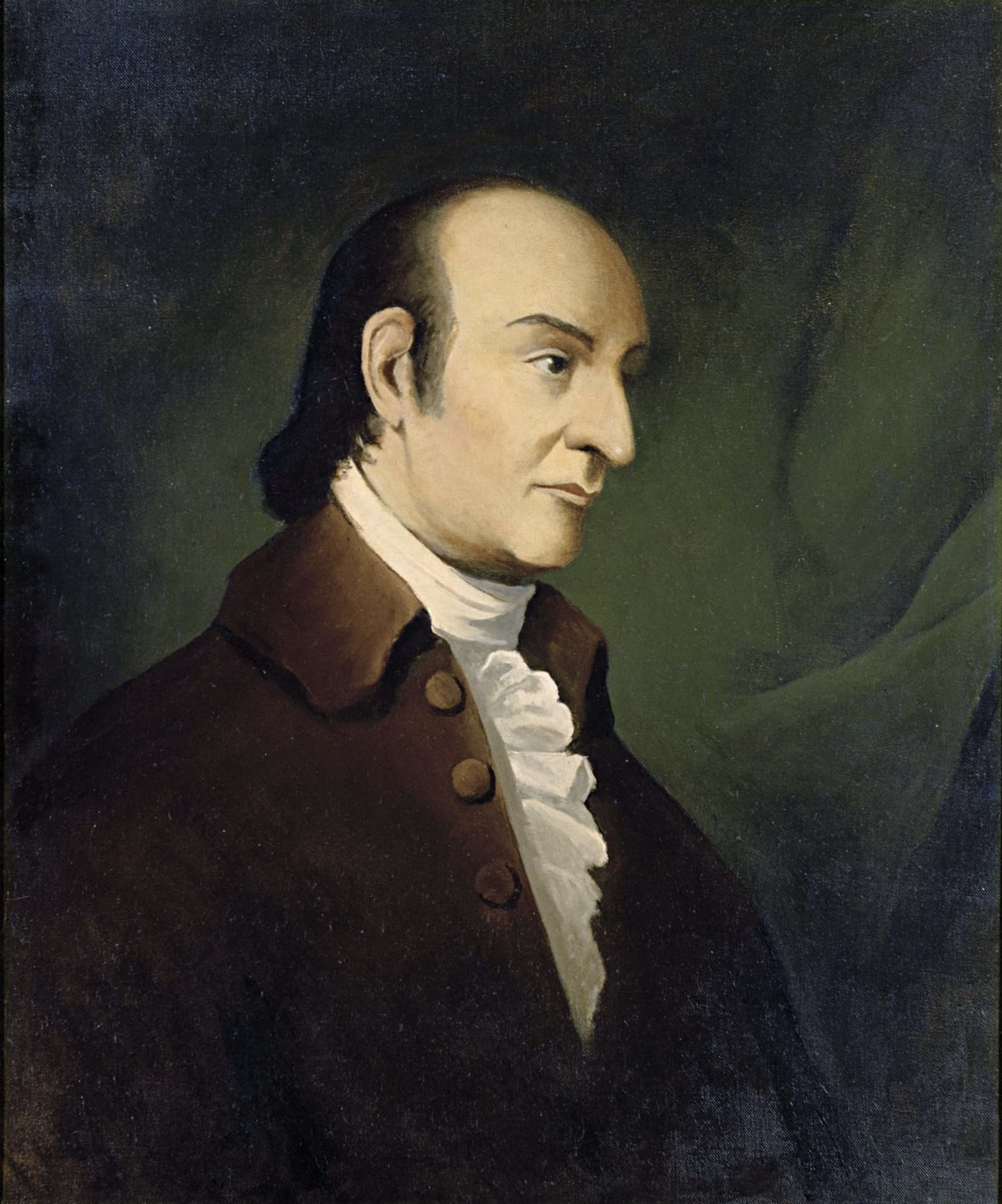
George Wythe, an influential Enlightenment-era lawyer

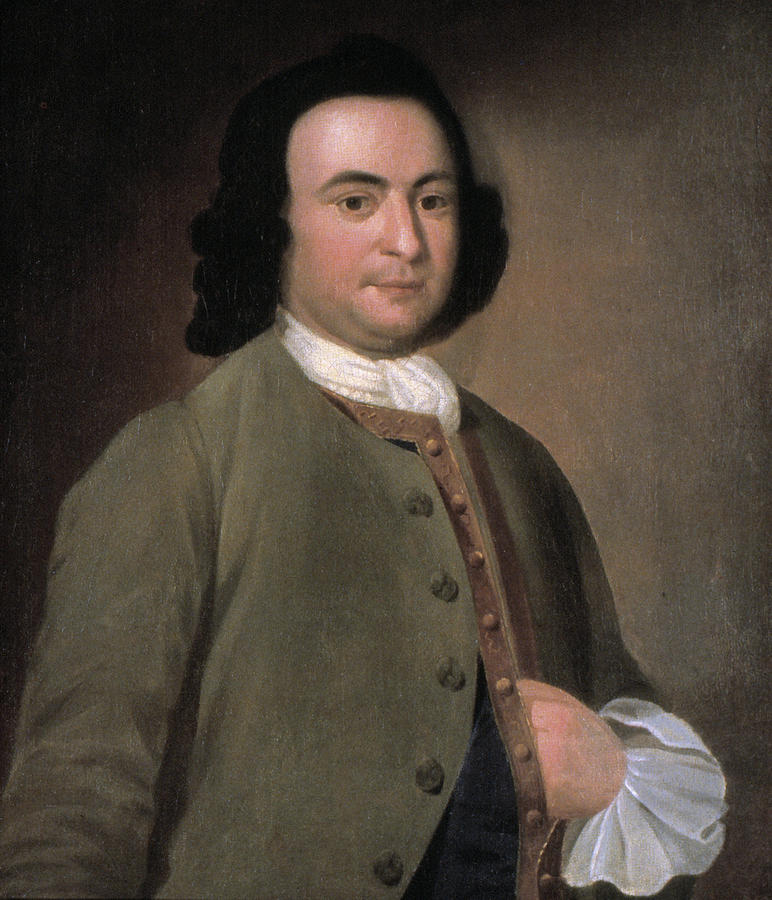
George Mason, author of the Virginia Bill of Rights

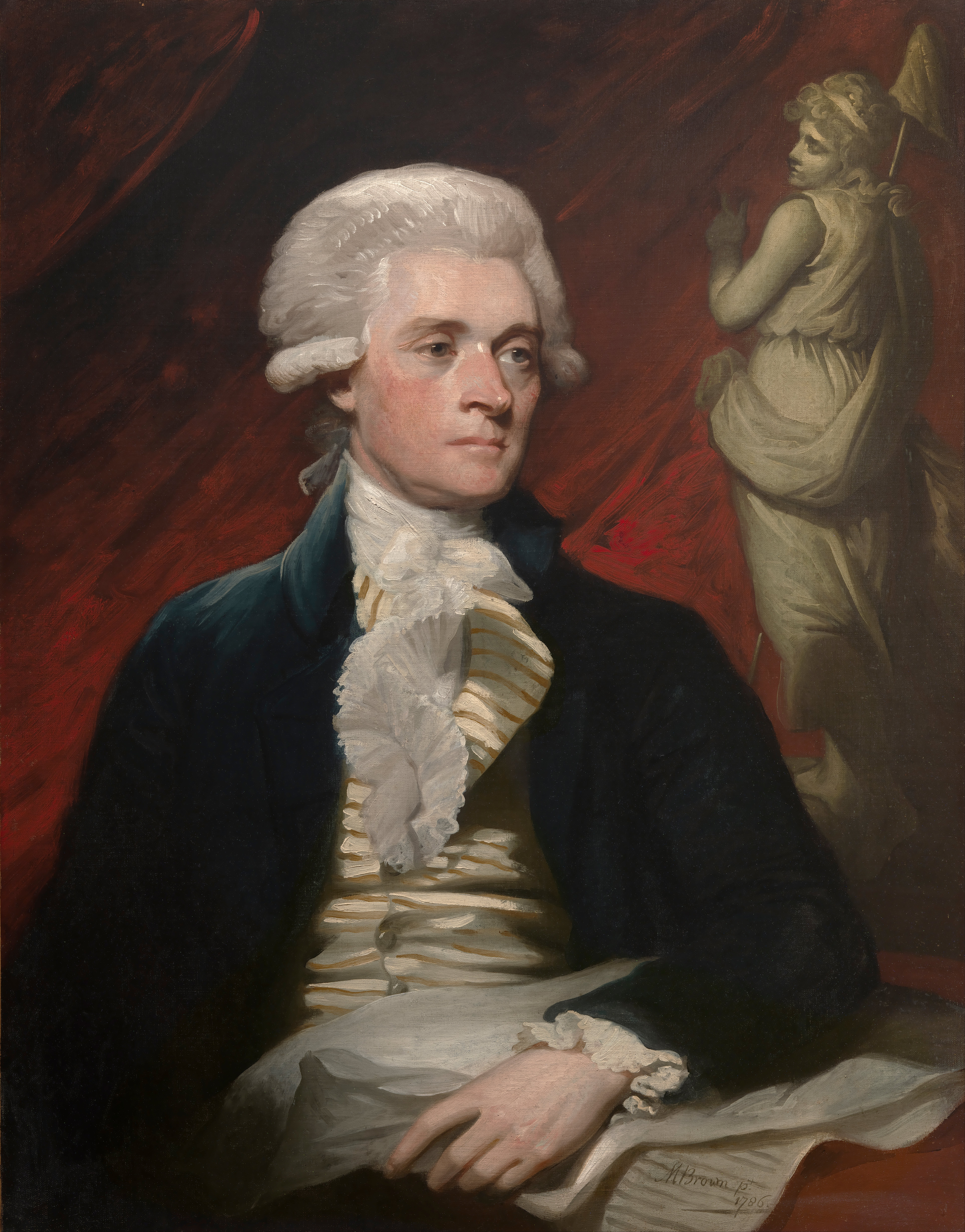
Thomas Jefferson at the Second Continental Congress in Philadelphia

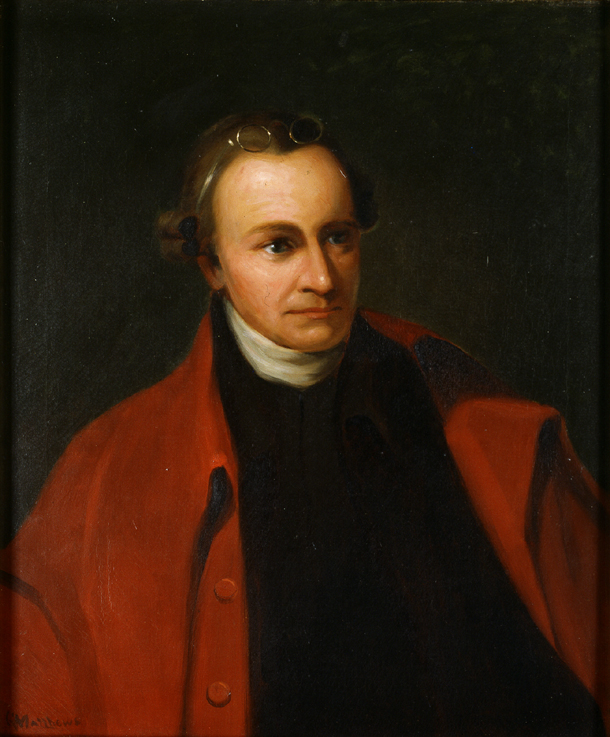
Patrick Henry, an early proponent of independence and the American Revolution

The Convention convened from May 6 to July 5, 1776, at the colonial capitol in Williamsburg. It elected Edmund Pendleton its presiding officer after his return as president of the First Continental Congress in Philadelphia.

There were three parties in the Fifth Convention. The first was mainly made up of wealthy planters, who sought to continue their hold on local government as it had grown up during colonial Virginia's history. These included Robert Carter Nicholas Sr., who opposed the Declaration of Independence from King George III. It dominated the convention by a malapportionment that lent an advantage to the slaveholding east. This party likely ensured the continuation of slavery at a time when other states had already begun ending it with gradual emancipation. It ensured the continued self-perpetuating gentry rule of county government with a franchise limited by property requirements underpinning the republican form of state government. The second party was made up of the intellectuals of the Enlightenment-era lawyers, physicians, and aspiring young men. These included the older generation of George Mason, George Wythe, Edmund Pendleton, and the younger Thomas Jefferson and James Madison. The third party was a minority of young men mainly from western Virginia in present-day West Virginia. This party was led by Patrick Henry and others who supported independence from Britain prior to 1775.

On May 15, the Convention declared that the government of Virginia as "formerly exercised" by King George III in Parliament was "totally dissolved" in light of the King's repeated injuries and his "abandoning the helm of government and declaring us out of his allegiance and protection". The Convention adopted a set of three resolutions: one calling for a declaration of rights for Virginia, one calling for the establishment of a republican constitution, and a third calling for federal relations with whichever other colonies would have them and alliances with whichever foreign countries would have them. It also instructed its delegates to the Continental Congress in Philadelphia to declare independence. Virginia's congressional delegation was the only one under unconditional positive instructions to declare independence; Virginia was already independent of Parliament as the "fourth realm" of British Empire, but its convention did not want their state, in the words of Benjamin Franklin, to "hang separately."

According to James Madison's correspondence for that day, Williamsburg residents marked the occasion by taking down the Union Jack from over the colonial capitol and running up a continental union flag, keeping the Union Jack of the British Empire in the canton and adding the thirteen red and white stripes of the self-governing East India Company.

== Outcomes ==
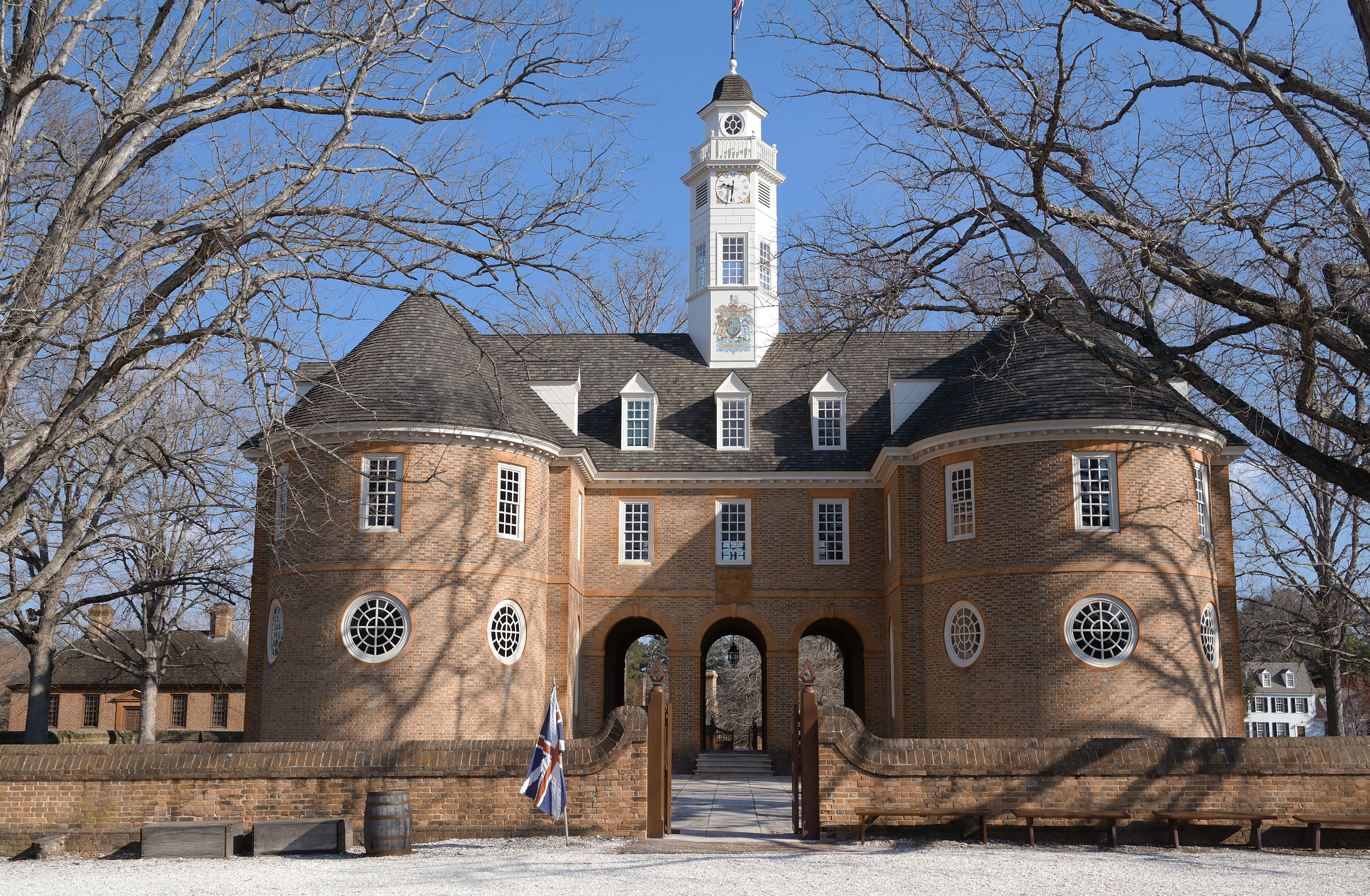
The colonial Virginia Capitol in Williamsburg, where the Fifth Virginia Convention met in 1776

On June 7, Richard Henry Lee, one of Virginia's delegates to the Second Continental Congress in Philadelphia, carried out the instructions to propose independence in the language the convention had commanded him to use: that "these colonies are, and of right ought to be, free and independent states." The resolution was followed in Congress by the adoption of the American Declaration of Independence, which reflected its ideas.

The convention amended, and on June 12 adopted, George Mason's Declaration of Rights, a precursor to the United States Bill of Rights. On June 29, the convention approved the first Constitution of Virginia. The convention selected Patrick Henry as the first governor of the new Commonwealth of Virginia, and Henry was inaugurated as governor on June 29, 1776, allowing Virginia to establish a functioning republican constitution a few days before the Second Continental Congress declared their independence on July 4, 1776.

== Notable attendees and chart of delegates ==
- John Banister
- Archibald Cary
- Patrick Henry
- Thomas Jefferson
- Joseph Jones
- Richard "Squire" Lee
- James Madison
- George Mason
- Robert Carter Nicholas Sr.
- John Page
- Edmund Pendleton
- French Strother
- John Augustine Washington
- George Wythe
- Col.Martin Pickett

The delegates to the Virginia Convention of 1776 – elected in 1776 (One hundred and thirty-two members, two from each county, and one each from the Boroughs of Jamestown, Williamsburg, Norfolk, and the College of William and Mary)

County/City	Name	Comments
Accomac	Southey Simpson	
Accomac	Isaac Smith	
Albemarle	Charles Lewis	
Albemarle	George Gilmer	for Thomas Jefferson
Amelia	John Tabb	
Amelia	John Winn	
Amherst	William Cabell	
Amherst	Gabriel Penn	
Augusta	Thomas Lewis	
Augusta	Samuel McDowell	
West Augusta	John Harvie	
West Augusta	Charles Simms	
Bedford	John Talbot	
Bedford	Charles Lynch	
Berkeley	Robert Rutherford	
Berkeley	William Drew	
Botetourt	John Bowyer	
Botetourt	Patrick Lockhart	
Brunswick	Frederick Maclin	
Brunswick	Henry Tazewell	
Buckingham	Charles Patteson	
Buckingham	John Cabell	
Caroline	Hon. Edmund Pendleton	Presiding officer
Caroline	James Taylor	
Chesterfield	Archibald Cary	
Chesterfield	Benjamin Watkins	
Charles City	William Acrill	
Charles City	Samuel Harwood	for Benjamin Harrison
Chesterfield	Hon. Paul Carrington	
Chesterfield	Thomas Read	
Culpeper	French Strother	
Culpeper	Henry Field	
Cumberland	John Mayo	
Cumberland	William Fleming	
Dinwiddie	John Banister	
Dinwiddie	Bolling Starke	
Dunmore	Abraham Bird	
Dunmore	John Tipton	
Elizabeth City	Wilson Miles Cary	
Elizabeth City	Henry King	
Essex	Meriwether Smith	
Essex	James Edmundson	
Fairfax	John West, Jr.	
Fairfax	George Mason	Bill of Rights
Fauquier	Martin Pickett	
Fauquier	James Scott	
Frederick	James Wood	
Frederick	Isaac Zane	
Fincastle	Arthur Campbell	
Fincastle	William Russell	
Gloucester	Thomas Whiting	
Gloucester	Lewis Burwell	
Goochland	John Woodson	
Goochland	Thomas M. Randolph	
Halifax	Nathaniel Terry	
Halifax	Micajah Watkins	
Hampshire	James Mercer	
Hampshire	Abraham Hite	
Hanover	Patrick Henry	
Hanover	John Syme	
Henrico	Nathaniel Watkinson	
Henrico	Richard Adams	
Isle of Wight	John S. Wills	
Isle of Wight	Charles Fulgham	
James City	Robert C. Nicholas	
James City	William Norvell	
King and Queen	George Brook	
King and Queen	William Lyne	
King George	William Fitzhugh	
King George	Joseph Jones	
King William	William Aylett	
King William	Richard Squire Taylor	
Lancaster	James Seldon	
Lancaster	James Gordon	
Loudoun	Francis Peyton	
Loudoun	Josiah Clapham	
Louisa	George Meriwether	
Louisa	Thomas Johnson	
Lunenburg	David Garland	
Lunenburg	Lodowick Farmer	
Mecklenburg	Joseph Speed	
Mecklenburg	Bennett Goode	
Middlesex	Edmund Berkeley	
Middlesex	James Montague	
Nansemond	Willis Riddick	
Nansemond	William Cowper	
New Kent	William Clayton	
New Kent	Bartholomew Dandridge	
Norfolk	James Holt	
Norfolk	Thomas Newton	
Northampton	Nathaniel L. Savage	
Northampton	George Savage	
Northumberland	Rodham Kenner	
Northumberland	John Cralle	
Orange	James Madison, Jr.	
Orange	William Moore	
Pittsylvania	Benjamin Lankford	
Pittsylvania	Robert Williams	
Prince Edward	William Watts	
Prince Edward	William Booker	
Prince George	Richard Bland	
Prince George	Peter Poythress	
Prince William	Henry Lee	
Prince William	Cuthbert Bullitt	
Princess Anne	William Robinson	
Princess Anne	John Thoroughgood	
Richmond	Hudson Muse	
Richmond	Charles McCarty	
Southampton	Edwin Gray	
Southampton	Henry Taylor	
Spotsylvania	Mann Page	
Spotsylvania	George Thornton	
Stafford	Thomas Ludwell Lee	
Stafford	William Brent	
Surry	Allen Cocke	
Surry	Nicholas Faulcon	
Sussex	David Mason	
Sussex	Henry Gee	
Warwick	William Harwood	
Warwick	Richard Cary	
Westmoreland	Richard Lee	
Westmoreland	John Augustine Washington	for Richard Henry Lee
York	Dudley Digges	
York	Thomas Nelson, Jr.	William Digges
Jamestown	Champion Travis	
Williamsburg	Edmund Randolph	for George Wythe
Norfolk Borough	William Roscow Wilson Curle	
College of William and Mary	John Blair	

== See also ==
- Virginia Conventions

== Bibliography ==
- Andrews, Matthew Page (1937). Virginia, the Old Dominion. Doubleday, Doran & Company. ASIN B0006E942K.
- Grigsby, Hugh Blair (1855). The Virginia Convention of 1776. Da Capo Press, NY. ISBN 978-1-4290-1760-2.
- Heinemann, Ronald L. (2008). Old Dominion, New Commonwealth: a history of Virginia, 1607-2007. University of Virginia Press. ISBN 978-0-8139-2769-5.
- Pulliam, David Loyd (1901). The Constitutional Conventions of Virginia from the foundation of the Commonwealth to the present time. John T. West, Richmond. ISBN 978-1-2879-2059-5.
- Tartar, Brent (2013). The Grandees of Government: the origins and persistence of undemocratic politics in Virginia. University of Virginia Press. ISBN 978-0-8139-3431-0.
