= 2nd Virginia General Assembly =

Virginia legislative term for 1777

←	1st	3rd	→
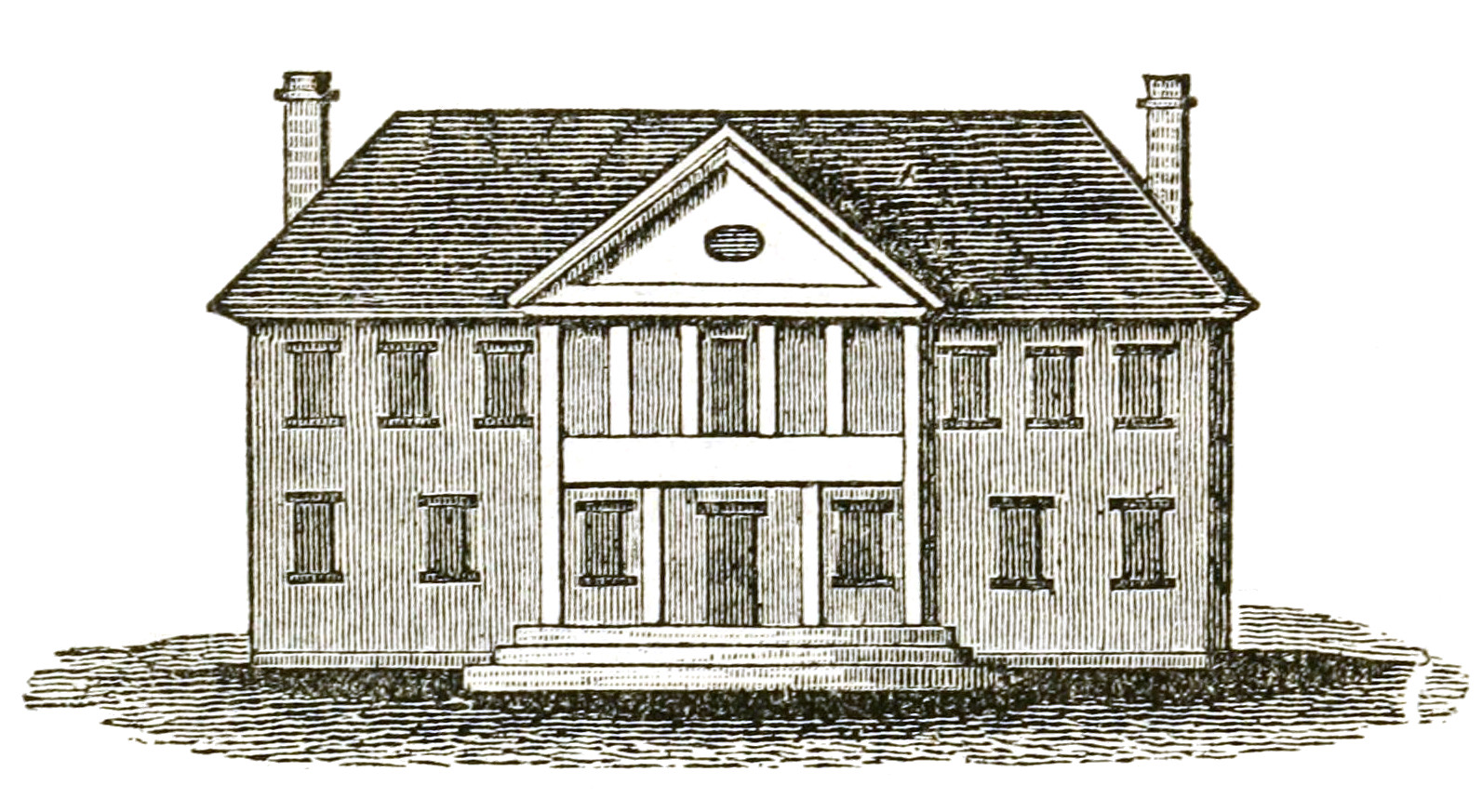
- 1845 engraving based on drawings of the second capitol at Williamsburg

Overview
- Legislative body: Virginia General Assembly
- Meeting place: Virginia Capitol, Williamsburg, Virginia
- Term: October 7, 1776 – December 21, 1776

Senate
- Members: 24
- Speaker: Archibald Cary

House of Delegates
- Members: 128
- Speaker: George Wythe

Sessions
- 1st: May 5, 1777 – June 28, 1777
- 2nd: October 20, 1777 – January 24, 1778

The Second Virginia General Assembly convened from May 5, 1777, to January 24, 1778, in two regular sessions.

== Sessions ==
- 1st Regular session: May 5, 1777 – June 28, 1777
- 2nd Regular session: October 20, 1777 – January 24, 1778

== Leaders ==
=== Senate leadership ===
- Speaker of the Senate: Archibald Cary

=== Assembly leadership ===
- Speaker of the Assembly: George Wythe

== Members ==
=== Members of the Senate ===
Members of the Senate of Virginia for the First Virginia General Assembly:

Class	Counties	Senator	Notes
1	Amelia, Chesterfield, & Cumberland	Archibald Cary	
1	Brunswick, Lunenburg, & Mecklenburg	John Jones	
1	Charles City, James City, & New Kent	Burwell Bassett	
1	Henrico, Goochland, & Louisa	Thomas Mann	
1	Augusta & Dunmore	Sampson Mathews	
1	Lancaster, Richmond, & Northumberland	Richard Mitchell	
2	Isle of Wight, Surry, & Prince George	Theodorick Bland	
2	Charlotte, Halifax, & Prince Edward	Paul Carrington	
2	Gloucester & Middlesex	Warner Lewis	
2	Spotsylvania, Orange, & Culpeper	James Walker	
2	Loudoun & Fauquier	William Ellzey	
2	Frederick, Berkeley, & Hampshire	Robert Rutherford	
3	Dinwiddie, Southampton, & Sussex	Edwin Gray	
3	Botetourt & Fincastle	William Fleming	
3	Hanover & Caroline	James Taylor	
3	Essex, King William, & King and Queen	George Brook	
3	Prince William & Fairfax	Henry Lee	
3	Monongalia, Yohogania, and Ohio	David Rogers	
4	Accomac & Northampton	Southey Simpson	
4	Princess Anne, Norfolk, & Nansemond	James Holt	
4	Buckingham, Albemarle, & Amherst	William Cabell	
4	Bedford & Pittsylvania	Edmund Winston	
4	Elizabeth City, Warwick, & York	Augustine Moore	
4	Westmoreland, Stafford, & King George	Thomas Ludwell Lee	

=== Members of the House of Delegates ===
Members of the Virginia House of Delegates for the Second Virginia General Assembly:

County	Delegate	Notes
Accomac	James Henry	
Accomac	James Arbuckle	
Albemarle	John Harvie	
Albemarle	Thomas Jefferson	
Amelia	Thomas Bolling Munford	
Amelia	John Winn	
Amherst	Hugh Rose	
Amherst	Gabriel Penn	
Augusta	John Poage	
Augusta	Samuel McDowell	
Bedford	John Talbot	
Bedford	Charles Lynch	
Berkeley	Philip Pendleton	
Berkeley	Thomas Hite	
Botetourt	John Bowyer	
Botetourt	Patrick Lockhart	
Brunswick	Frederick Maclin	
Brunswick	Henry Tazewell	
Buckingham	Charles Patteson	
Buckingham	John Cabell	
Caroline	Edmund Pendleton	
Caroline	Thomas Lowry	
Charles City	Benjamin Harrison	
Charles City	William Acrill	
Charlotte	William Hubard	
Charlotte	John Clayton	Elected in place of James Speed
Charlotte	James Speed	
Chesterfield	John Bolling	
Chesterfield	Jesse Cogbill	
Culpeper	Birkett Davenport	
Culpeper	French Strother	
Cumberland	Joseph Carrington	Selected to replace Fleming
Cumberland	William Fleming	Became deputy attorney
Cumberland	Beverley Randolph	
Dinwiddie	John Banister	
Dinwiddie	Bolling Starke	
Dunmore	Abraham Bird	
Dunmore	John Tipton	
Elizabeth City	Worlich Westwood	
Elizabeth City	Miles King	
Essex	John Edmondson	
Essex	William Smith	
Fairfax	Philip Alexander	
Fairfax	George Mason	
Fauquier	Martin Pickett	
Fauquier	Hugh Nelson	
Fluvanna	Thomas Napier	
Fluvanna	William Miles Cary	
Frederick	John Smith	
Frederick	Isaac Zane	
Gloucester	Lewis Burwell	
Gloucester	Mann Page	
Goochland	John Woodson	
Goochland	Thomas Underwood	
Halifax	Nathaniel Terry	
Halifax	Micajah Watkins	
Hampshire	Joseph Neavill	
Hampshire	Abraham Hite	
Hanover	Garland Anderson	
Hanover	John Syme	
Henrico	Nathaniel Wilkinson	
Henrico	Richard Adams	
Henry	Robert Hairston	
Henry	Abraham Penn	
Isle of Wight	John S. Wills	
Isle of Wight	Charles Fulgham	
James City	Robert C. Nicholas	
James City	William Norvell	
Kentucky	John Todd	
Kentucky	Richard Callaway	
King and Queen	Thomas Coleman	
King and Queen	William Lyne	
King and Queen	Henry Todd	
King George	Joseph Jones	
King George	Thomas Jett	
King William	Carter Braxton	
King William	William Dandridge Claiborne	
Lancaster	Cyrus Griffin	
Lancaster	James Gordon	
Loudoun	Thomson Mason	
Loudoun	Josiah Clapham	
Louisa	George Meriwether	
Louisa	James Dabney	
Lunenburg	John Glenn	
Lunenburg	Thomas Pettus	
Mecklenburg	Henry Delony	
Mecklenburg	Joseph Speed	
Middlesex	Beverley Daniel	
Middlesex	James Montague	
Monongalia	John Corbley	
Monongalia	John Pierce Duvall	
Montgomery	Walter Crockett	
Montgomery	John Montgomery	
Nansemond	Willis Riddick	
Nansemond	William Cowper	
New Kent	Richmond Allen	
New Kent	Lewis Webb	
Norfolk	Matthew Godfrey	
Norfolk	John Wilson	
Northampton	Nathaniel L. Savage	
Northampton	Thomas Parsons	
Northumberland	William Eskridge	
Northumberland	Daniel Muse	
Ohio	David McClure	
Ohio	George McCulloch	
Orange	Charles Porter	
Orange	William Moore	
Pittsylvania	Abraham Shelton	
Pittsylvania	Peter Perkins	
Prince Edward	William Booker	
Prince Edward	John Morton	Replaced having been elected Sheriff
Prince Edward	Thomas Flournoy	Chosen to replace John Morton
Prince George	Edmund Ruffin Jr.	
Prince George	Benjamin Harrison Jr.	
Prince William	Cuthbert Bullitt	
Prince William	Jesse Ewell	
Princess Anne	William Robinson	
Princess Anne	John Thoroughgood	
Richmond	William Smith	
Richmond	Williamson Ball	
Southampton	Henry Taylor	
Southampton	Richard Kello	
Spotsylvania	Beverley Winslow	
Spotsylvania	George Thornton	
Stafford	Charles Carter	
Stafford	William Fitzhugh	
Surry	William Browne	
Surry	John Hartwell Cocke	
Sussex	Henry Gee	
Sussex	Gray Judkins	
Warwick	Cole Digges	
Warwick	Francis Leigh	
Warwick	Edward Harwood	
Washington	Anthony Bledsoe	
Washington	William Cocke	
Westmoreland	Richard Henry Lee	
Westmoreland	Richard Lee	
Yohogania	John Cannon	
Yohogania	Joshua Wright	
York	Thomas Nelson Jr.	
York	Joseph Prentis	
Williamsburg	George Wythe	
Norfolk Borough	William Roscow	
Norfolk Borough	Wilson Curle	

== Employees ==
- Senate Clerk: John Pendleton Jr.
- House Clerk: John Tazewell

== See also ==
- List of Virginia state legislatures
