= Loudoun Resolves =

American Revolutionary War document

The Loudoun Resolves was a resolution adopted by a committee in Loudoun County in the colony of Virginia on June 14, 1774, during the very early stages of the American Revolution. It was one of the earliest public declarations objecting to the Intolerable Acts, passed by Parliament to punish Massachusetts Colonists for conducting and supporting the Boston Tea Party. The Loudoun Resolves also was the first colonial document implying its signers would employ force in resisting Britain's use of military power to implement the Acts, which it declared would cause a civil war. Loudoun colonists at the same time declared a boycott of all East India Company products and an end to commerce with England until the Boston Port Act, the first of the Intolerable Acts, was repealed and Parliament abandoned political control of its North American colonies.

== Background and drafting ==
After Parliament passed the Intolerable Acts, also known as the Coercive Acts, to punish Massachusetts for the Boston Tea Party, the Virginia House of Burgesses proclaimed that June 1, 1774, would be a day of "fasting, humiliation, and prayer" as a show of solidarity with Boston. In response, Lord Dunmore, Virginia's royal governor, dissolved the House of Burgesses. The Burgesses reconvened at the Raleigh Tavern on May 27 and called for Virginia's counties to elect and send delegates to a special convention meeting in August in Williamsburg.

In response, on June 14, 1774, Loudoun County "Freeholders and other inhabitants" met in the county court house in Leesburg to "consider the most effectual method to preserve the rights and liberties of N. America, and relieve our brethren of Boston, suffering under the most oppressive and tyrannical Act of the British Parliament." Chaired by Francis Peyton, the group drafted a document containing seven "resolutions" declaring their loyalty to Britain and the king but opposing any tax imposed without a representative voice in the decision. They similarly declared opposition to the Boston Port Act, the first of the Intolerable Acts, because it punished the people of Massachusetts without a trial, which they considered an unconstitutional act designed to "enslave a free and loyal people."

Loudoun signers declared they would sacrifice their "lives and fortunes" in resisting any military action Britain might take to enforce the Port Act or in punishing any North American colonists, which they declared would precipitate a civil war. They unanimously announced a boycott of tea and other East India Company products imported after June 1, 1774. Loudoun signers also declared an end to all commerce with England until the Boston Port Act was repealed and Parliament ended its political control of all its North American colonies.

== Text summary and effect ==
Explaining they sought "the most effectual method to preserve the rights and liberties of N. America" and to alleviate Bostonians' suffering caused by the harbor's obstruction, they resolved—declared—that:

- They are loyal British subjects who acknowledge the law;
- It Is unjust to tax people who lack representation in that decision;
- Parliament's Boston Port Act Is unjust, unconstitutional, and will lead to enslavement;
- Enforcing the Boston Port Act with military force will lead to civil war. If that comes, Loudoun citizens will give their lives and fortunes to support Boston or anyplace in North America so threatened, until their concerns are addressed and their liberties secured;
- They will boycott East India Company tea and all other products;
- The trade boycott was extended to Britain itself, ceasing all commerce until the Boston Port Act is repealed and Parliament abandons its rule over all North American domestic issues;
- They would stand by these declarations, first by sending two men to represent Loudoun County in an August 1 meeting In Williamsburg, called to gauge Virginia's view on the Port Act. Second, they will continue corresponding with other committees created to stand firm in seeing this Issue through to success.

Thomson Mason and Francis Peyton were named to represent Loudoun County at the August 1, 1774 meeting in Williamsburg. It also formed a three-person committee to correspond with other Virginia county committees responding to the Intolerable Acts.

Other local Resolves soon followed Loudoun's. By July 1774 the Fairfax Resolves, drafted by George Mason at George Washington's direction, was issued, making a considerably more philosophical but no less determined statement opposing the Intolerable Acts. Soon New York, North Carolina, Massachusetts, Maryland, and three more Virginia counties would issue their own Resolves opposing the Acts.

== Signatories ==
- Francis Peyton° – Chairman, representative to the Williamsburg meeting, correspondence committee member.
- Thomson Mason° - Representative to the Williamsburg meeting, correspondence committee member.
- Leven Powell° - Correspondence committee member.
- William Ellzey° - Correspondence committee member.
- John Thornton° - Correspondence committee member.
- George Johnston° - Correspondence committee member.
- Samuel Levi° - Correspondence committee member.
- John Morton
- Thomas Ray
- Thomas Drake
- William Booram
- Benj. Isaac Humphrey
- Samuel Mills
- Joshua Singleton
- Jonathan Drake
- Matthew Rust
- Thomas Williams
- James Noland
- Samuel Peugh
- William Nornail
- Thomas Luttrell
- James Brair
- Poins Awsley
- John Kendrick
- Edward O'Neal

° Named in the main document, his name does not appear signed at the end.
