= Leven Powell =

American politician (1737–1810)

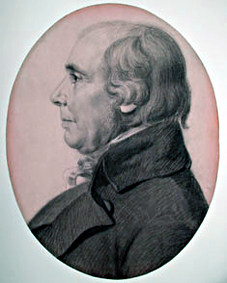

Member of the U.S. House of Representatives from Virginia's 17th district
- In office March 4, 1799 – March 3, 1801
- Preceded by: Richard Brent
- Succeeded by: Richard Brent

Member of the Virginia House of Delegates
- In office October 17, 1791 – October 20, 1793 Serving with Albert Russell, Joseph Lane
- Preceded by: William Gunnell
- Succeeded by: Albert Russell
- In office October 15, 1787 – October 18, 1789 Serving with Josiah Clapham, Richard Bland Lee
- Preceded by: Francis Peyton
- Succeeded by: Albert Russell
- In office May 3, 1779 – October 18, 1789 Serving with Josiah Clapham
- Preceded by: Thomson Mason
- Succeeded by: Francis Peyton

Personal details
- Born: 1737 near Manassas, Prince William County, Virginia Colony, British America
- Died: August 23, 1810 (aged 72–73) Bedford, Pennsylvania, U.S.
- Resting place: Old Presbyterian Graveyard
- Party: Federalist
- Spouse: Sally Harrison
- Children: several, including Cuthbert, Burr, Alfred
- Occupation: Planter, merchant, soldier

Leven Powell (1737 – August 23, 1810) was a Virginia planter, merchant, Continental Army officer and Federalist politician who served several terms in the Virginia House of Delegates as well as in the Virginia Ratification Convention representing Loudoun County, and one term as a United States representative for Virginia's 17th congressional district.

== Early and family life ==
Leven Powell was born near Haymarket in Prince William County in the Colony of Virginia.to the former Eleanor Peyton (daughter of prominent planter and burgess Valentine Peyton), and her ship captain and planter husband William Powell (circa 1705–1787). Powell's ship worked in the coastal trade and he moved from Somerset County, Maryland to Dumfries circa 1734, then also invested in land in Prince William and Loudoun counties before becoming a commissary furnishing beef to the patriot forces in the American Revolutionary War. Both parents could trace their descent from the First Families of Virginia. As was customary for his class, Leven received a private education.

Powell married Sarah (Sally) Harrison (1742–1812), the daughter of local planter Burr Harrison, who like Leven Powell would serve in the American Revolutionary War. The couple had several children, including William Harrison Powell born in 1766 and Leven Powell Jr. born in 1772, who remained in Loudoun county as a planter. Their sons Burr Powell, Cuthbert Powell and Alfred H. Powell became lawyers as well as followed their father's political career path—lawyer Burr Powell remained in Middleburg and served in both houses of the Virginia General Assembly, and his brother Cuthbert became mayor of Alexandria as well as a U.S. Congressman.

== Career ==
Powell began his public career deputy sheriff of Prince William County under his uncle Col. Henry Peyton.

However, Powell (like his father, Col. Peyton and his many cousins) primarily supported his family as a planter. He purchased 500 acres in newly formed Loudoun County and moved there in 1763, shortly after marrying his wife, Sally, whose planter father Burr Harrison owned a large estate further upstream along the Potomac River. Powell built a home he called "the Shades", as well as the first flour mill in the area. Over time, he came to operate what became five plantations totaling 1800 acres using enslaved labor. Powell owned 22 slaves, 18 horses, 24 cattle and a 2-wheeled carriage in 1787. He (or his son of the same name) owned 13 slaves in 1810, the year Powell died visiting a health spring in Pennsylvania. Powell also operated a store, and at some point purchased a mill on Hungry Run, which he named "Sally Mill" after his wife.

=== Military officer ===
As relations with Great Britain worsened in the years before the American Revolutionary War, Powell served on the 15-member Loudoun County Committee of Safety in 1774. In either 1774 or 1775 he accepted a commission as major in a company of Loudoun County minutemen that traveled to southeastern Virginia, where they harassed Lord Dunmore's troops in Norfolk and Hampton and were ultimately incorporated into the Continental Army. In January 1777, General Washington promoted Powell to lieutenant colonel of Grayson's Additional Continental Regiment (a/k/a Virginia's 16th Regiment). He and his troops fought at the Battle of Long Island, Battle of Brandywine and the Battle of Monmouth. However, health complications due to the harsh winter encampment at Valley Forge (which nearly caused him to lose an eye) led Powell to resign in 1778, although the Virginia General Assembly would later vote him a full share of frontier land for his service.

Three of his brothers also served with the Continental Army: Dr. John Thomas Powell (1745–1807) served as a surgeon, then returned to Dumfries. Lt. William Powell III (1745–1807) served three years under Lt. Col. Daniel Morgan, and the youngest brother Lt. John Peyton Powell (1760–1844) also served in Morgan's 11th Virginia Regiment (renamed the 7th Virginia Regiment in 1779), then received land and moved westward—first to Hardeman County, Tennessee and eventually died in Madison County, Alabama.

=== Politician ===
A local historian noted Powell's transition from military hero to politician and considered Powell the county's leading Federalist from the 1780s until the early 1800s, when Charles F. Mercer became prominent as a supporter of turnpikes.

Powell first won election to the Virginia House of Delegates in 1779, representing Loudoun County (part-time) alongside his cousin, veteran Francis Peyton. However, Peyton chose to become the new county's land commissioner and Powell the land office's deputy register, so one of them resigned and the other served alongside Col. Josiah Clapham in that legislative session. Powell definitely served alongside Col. Clapham in the session beginning October 15, 1787, then won re-election (but served alongside Richard Bland Lee) in the 1788 session. Powell also won election as one of Loudoun County's delegates to the Virginia ratification convention in 1788, this time alongside Stevens Thomson Mason, who unlike Powell but like his uncle George Mason voted against ratification. However, Powell did not again win election to the House of Delegates until 1791, when he served alongside Albert Russell, who had represented the county alongside bridgebuilder William Gunnell during the previous two sessions, then Powell won re-election and served alongside Joseph Lane.

Powell also helped found two towns in Loudoun County. The most important of them was Middleburg, on his land at the junction of the Alexandria to Winchester turnpike (now part of U.S. Route 50) and the road between the Loudoun county seat (Leesburg) and the Fauquier county seat (Warrenton). Powell had purchased 50 acres from Joseph Chinn (who in 1728 had built Chinn's Ordinary, now called the Red Fox Inn, near the center of that 50 acre parcel). The area had been called "Chinn's Crossroads", and became known as "Powell Town". The Virginia legislature incorporated the town in 1787, with nonresidents (but landowners and political veterans) Francis Peyton, William Bronaugh, William Heale, John P. Harrison, Burr Harrison, Josiah Clapham and Richard Bland Lee as trustees.

Powell collected ground rent but declined to have the town named after him, so it became "Middleburgh" (later shortened). In 1801 the Fairfax and Loudoun Turnpike Company of which Powell was a director was superseded by the Little River Turnpike Company (in which Mercer was prominent). Meanwhile, in 1790, Powell was one of the founding trustees of Matildaville, which was promoted by Lighthorse Harry Lee (Virginia's governor 1791–1795). Although the town did not become the new federal capital city as Lee had hoped, Matildaville became the headquarters of the Patowmack Company, which built a series of canals and locks to circumvent the falls of the Potomac River by 1802, but which never achieved financial success and was by 1828 subsumed in the Chesapeake and Ohio Canal Company.

Powell founded the Federalist Party in Loudoun County. In the 1796 presidential election, Powell stood alone among Virginia's 21 electors in voting for John Adams over Thomas Jefferson. Voters also elected Powell as a Federalist to the Sixth Congress (March 4, 1799 – March 3, 1801).

== Death and legacy ==
Powell died visiting health springs in Bedford, Pennsylvania in 1810, and was buried there in the Old Presbyterian Graveyard. His widow, who remained in Loudon County, survived him by two years. His birthplace, now known as the Powell-Allen House, was placed on the National Register of Historic Places in 1976.

U.S. House of Representatives
Preceded by Richard Brent	Member of the U.S. House of Representatives from Virginia's 17th congressional district 1799–1801	Succeeded by Richard Brent
