= Intolerable Acts =

Series of punitive laws passed by the British Parliament in 1774

The Intolerable Acts, sometimes referred to as the Insufferable Acts or Coercive Acts, were a series of five punitive laws passed by the British Parliament in 1774 after the Boston Tea Party. The laws aimed to collectively punish Massachusetts colonists for the actions of those protesting against the Tea Act, a measure enacted by Parliament in May 1773 to give the British East India Company a monopoly on tea sales, by dumping tea into Boston harbor. In Great Britain and the American colonies these laws were referred to as the Coercive Acts. The term Intolerable Acts did not arise until the 19th century. Many Massachusetts colonists considered them a "virtual declaration of war" by the British government. They were a key development leading to the outbreak of the American Revolutionary War in April 1775.

Four acts were enacted by Parliament in early 1774 after the Boston Tea Party of 16 December 1773: Boston Port, Massachusetts Government, Impartial Administration of Justice, and Quartering Acts. The acts took away self-governance and rights that Massachusetts had enjoyed since its founding, triggering outrage and indignation in the Thirteen Colonies.

The British Parliament hoped these punitive measures would, by making an example of Massachusetts, reverse the trend of colonial resistance to parliamentary authority that had begun with the Sugar Act 1764. A fifth act, the Quebec Act, enlarged the boundaries of what was then the Province of Quebec notably southwestward into the Ohio Country and other future mid-western states, and instituted reforms generally favorable to the francophone Catholic inhabitants of the region. Although unrelated to the other four Acts, it was passed in the same legislative session and seen by the colonists as one of the Intolerable Acts. The Patriots viewed the acts as an arbitrary violation of the rights of Massachusetts, and in September 1774 they organized the First Continental Congress to coordinate a protest. As tensions escalated, the Revolutionary War broke out in April 1775, leading to the declaration of an independent United States of America in July 1776.

== Background ==
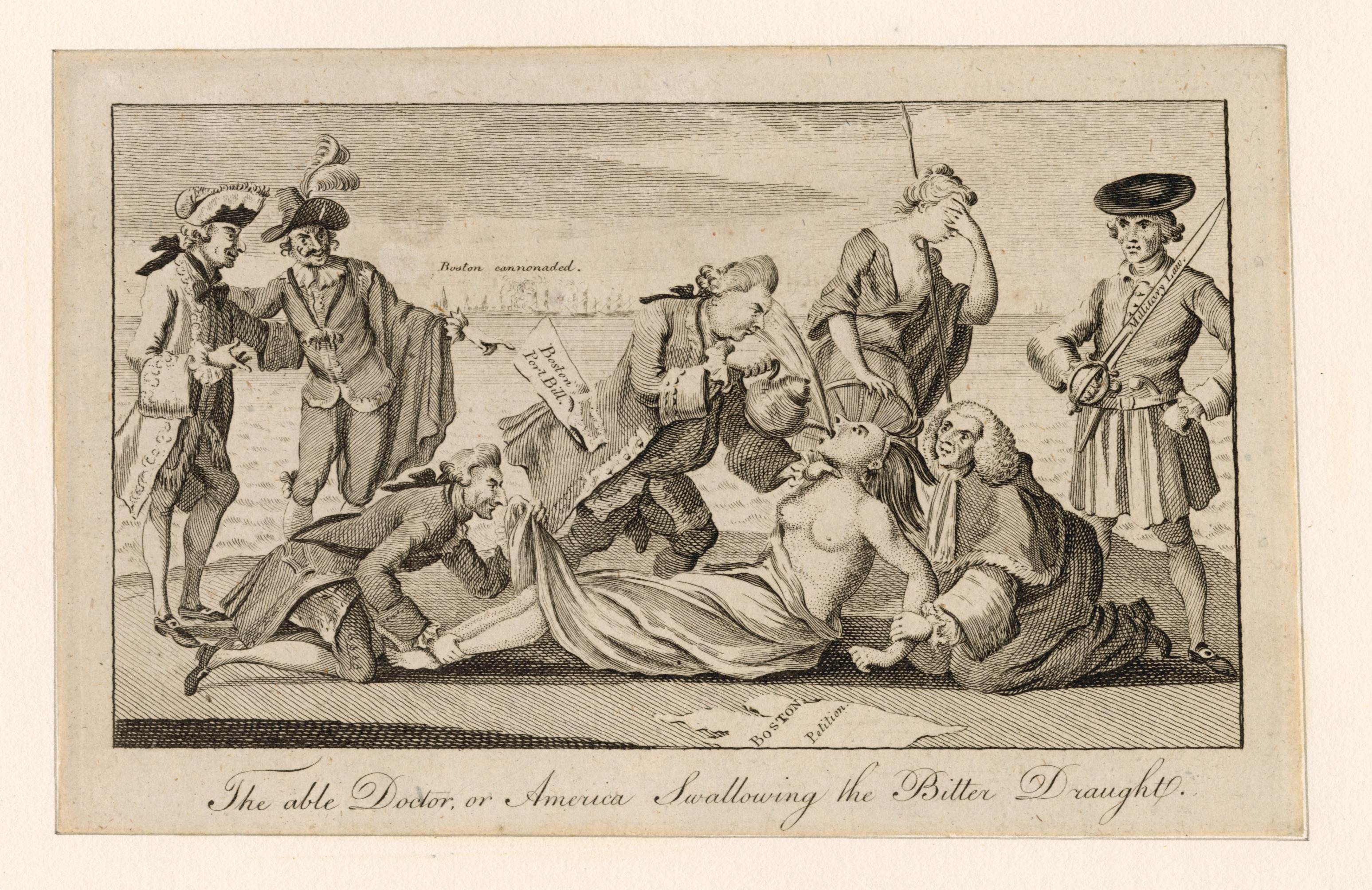
This Patriot cartoon depicting the Coercive Acts as the forcing of tea on a Native American woman (a symbol of the American colonies) was copied and distributed in the Thirteen Colonies.

Relations between the Thirteen Colonies and the British Parliament slowly but steadily worsened after the end of the Seven Years' War (French and Indian War) in 1763. The war had plunged the British government deep into debt, and so the British Parliament enacted a series of measures to increase tax revenue from the colonies. Parliament believed that these acts, such as the Stamp Act 1765 and the Townshend Acts of 1767, were legitimate means of having the colonies pay their fair share of the costs of maintaining the British Empire. Although protests led to the repeal of the Stamp and Townshend Acts, Parliament adhered to the position that it had the right to legislate for the colonies "in all cases whatsoever" in the Declaratory Act 1766.

Many colonists argued that under the unwritten British constitution, a British subject's property could not be taken from him (in the form of taxes) without his consent (in the form of representation in government). Therefore, because the colonies were not directly represented in Parliament, it followed that Parliament had no right to levy taxes upon them, a view expressed by the slogan "No taxation without representation". After the Townshend Acts, some colonial essayists took this line of thinking even further, and began to question whether Parliament had any legitimate jurisdiction in the colonies at all. This question of the extent of Parliament's sovereignty in the colonies was the issue underlying what became the American Revolution.

== Passage ==
On 16 December 1773, a group of Patriot colonists associated with the Sons of Liberty destroyed 342 chests of tea in Boston, Massachusetts, an act that came to be known as the Boston Tea Party. The colonists partook in this action because Parliament had passed the Tea Act, which granted the British East India Company an act that enabled said company to be excluded from the taxation of tea. This angered colonists, especially other merchants (Leading to said Tea Party).

News of the Boston Tea Party reached England in January 1774. Parliament responded by passing four laws. Three of the laws were intended to directly punish Massachusetts. This was for the destruction of private property, to restore British authority in Massachusetts, and to otherwise reform colonial government in America.

On 22 April 1774, Prime Minister Lord North defended the programme in the House of Commons, saying:

The Americans have tarred and feathered your subjects, plundered your merchants, burnt your ships, denied all obedience to your laws and authority; yet so clement and so long forbearing has our conduct been that it is incumbent on us now to take a different course. Whatever may be the consequences, we must risk something; if we do not, all is over.

== The Acts ==
The Boston Port Act was the first of the laws passed 31 March 1774 in response to the Boston Tea Party. It closed the port of Boston until the colonists paid for the destroyed tea and the king was satisfied that order had been restored. Colonists objected that the Port Act punished all of Boston rather than just the individuals who had destroyed the tea, and that they were being punished without having been given an opportunity to testify in their own defense.

The Massachusetts Government Act of 20 May 1774 provoked even more outrage than the Port Act because it unilaterally took away Massachusetts' charter and brought it under control of the British government. Under the terms of the Government Act, almost all positions in the colonial government were to be appointed by the governor, Parliament, or the king. The act also severely limited town meetings in Massachusetts to one per year, unless the governor called for one. Colonists outside Massachusetts feared that their governments could now also be changed by the legislative fiat of Parliament.

The Administration of Justice Act also of 20 May 1774 allowed the royal governor to order trials of accused royal officials to take place in Great Britain or elsewhere within the Empire if he decided that the defendant could not get a fair trial in Massachusetts. Although the act stipulated for witnesses to be reimbursed after having traveled at their own expense across the Atlantic, it was not stipulated that this would include reimbursement for lost earnings during the period for which they would be unable to work, leaving few with the ability to testify. George Washington called this the "Murder Act" because he believed that it allowed officials to harass colonists and then escape justice. Many colonists believed the act was unnecessary because British soldiers had been given a fair trial following the Boston Massacre in 1770.

The Quartering Act, which applied to all British colonies in North America, sought to create a more effective method of housing British troops. In a previous act, the colonies had been required to provide housing for soldiers, but colonial legislatures had been uncooperative in doing so. The new Quartering Act allowed a governor to house soldiers in other buildings if suitable quarters were not provided. While many sources claim that the Quartering Act allowed troops to be billeted in occupied private homes, historian David Ammerman's 1974 study claimed that this is a myth, and that the act only permitted troops to be quartered in unoccupied buildings.

Although unrelated to the aforementioned Acts, the Quebec Act, passed in the same parliamentary session, was considered by the colonists to be one of the Intolerable Acts. The Act expanded the territory of the Province of Quebec into the Great Lakes region and much of what is now the Midwestern United States, which appeared to void the land claims of the Ohio Company on the region. The guarantee of free practice of Catholicism, the majority religion in Canada, was seen by colonists as an "establishment" of the faith in the colonies which were overwhelmingly Protestant. Furthermore, colonists resented the lenient provisions granted to their erstwhile enemies whom they had fought hard against during the French and Indian War.

== Effects ==
Many colonists saw the Intolerable Acts as a violation of their constitutional rights, their natural rights, and their colonial charters. They, therefore, viewed the acts as a threat to the liberties of all of British America, not just Massachusetts. Legislation denouncing the act (the Loudoun Resolves and Fairfax Resolves) was swift, and Richard Henry Lee of Virginia described the acts as "a most wicked System for destroying the liberty of America".

The citizens of Boston viewed the Intolerable Acts as unnecessary and cruel punishment, further inflaming hatred toward Britain. Even more Bostonians turned against British rule.

Great Britain hoped that the Intolerable Acts would isolate radicals in Massachusetts and cause American colonists to concede the authority of Parliament over their elected assemblies. The calculated risk backfired: the harshness of some of the acts made it difficult for colonial moderates to speak in favor of Parliament. Instead, the acts only served to distance the colonies from the Crown, create sympathy for Massachusetts and encourage colonists from the otherwise diverse colonies to form committees of correspondence which sent delegates to the First Continental Congress. The Continental Congress created the Continental Association, an agreement to boycott British goods. Additionally, it was decided that if the Intolerable Acts were not reversed after a year, goods were to stop being exported to Great Britain as well. The Congress also pledged to support Massachusetts in case of attack, which meant that all of the colonies would become involved when the American Revolutionary War began at Lexington and Concord.
