= Fairfax Resolves =

1774 resolutions rejecting British authority in America

The Fairfax Resolves were a set of resolutions adopted by a committee in Fairfax County in the Colony of Virginia on July 18, 1774, in the early stages of the American Revolution. Written at the behest of George Washington and others, they were authored primarily by George Mason. The resolutions rejected the British Parliament's claim of supreme authority over the American colonies. More than thirty counties in Virginia passed similar resolutions in 1774, including the Loudoun Resolves issued in June, "but the Fairfax Resolves were the most detailed, the most influential, and the most radical."

== Background and drafting ==
After Parliament passed the Coercive Acts, also known as the Intolerable Acts, to punish Massachusetts for the Boston Tea Party, the Virginia House of Burgesses proclaimed that June 1, 1774, would be a day of "fasting, humiliation, and prayer" as a show of solidarity with Boston. In response, Lord Dunmore, the royal governor of Virginia, dissolved the House of Burgesses. The burgesses reconvened at the Raleigh Tavern on May 27 and called for Virginia's counties to elect delegates to a special convention to meet in August. George Washington and Charles Broadwater were elected as Fairfax County's representatives to the convention.

On July 5, 1774, Washington and others from Fairfax County met in Alexandria, Virginia, to appoint a committee to draft a statement that would, as Washington described it, "define our Constitutional Rights." The statement would also formally serve as instructions to Fairfax County's delegates to the Virginia Convention. The committee wrote a draft that was, in all likelihood, primarily the work of George Mason. Mason and Washington met at Washington's Mount Vernon home on July 17, and perhaps revised the resolutions. The following day in Alexandria, the Fairfax Resolves were endorsed in a meeting of freeholders chaired by Washington.

== Text summary and effect ==
In the Resolves, the freeholders expressed a desire to remain subjects of the British Empire, but they insisted that "we will use every means which Heaven hath given us to prevent our becoming its slaves."

The short document provided the following:

- a concise summary of American constitutional concerns on such issues as taxation, representation, judicial power, military matters and the colonial economy
- a proposal for the creation of a nonimportation effort to be levied against British goods
- a call for a general congress of the colonies to convene for the purpose of preserving the Americans' rights as Englishmen
- a condemnation of the practice of importing slaves as a "wicked, cruel, and unnatural trade"; its termination was urged

The Resolves directed Washington and Broadwater to present the resolutions to the Virginia Convention.

The Fairfax Resolves, like the many other similar resolutions passed in county meetings throughout the colonies, summarized the feelings of many colonists in mid-1774 — a conviction that their constitutional rights were being violated by British policies. The Resolves also marked a step forward in inter-colonial cooperation as more Americans began to realize that a threat against one colony was a threat against all. Finally, political rivalries in Virginia were muted to some degree, allowing such figures as Washington and Mason to work productively with the more radical Patrick Henry, Richard Henry Lee and others.

The non-importation protest called for in the Resolves recalled, with some modifications, the Virginia Association, which in turn provided the pattern for the Continental Association which was passed by the First Continental Congress on October 20, 1774.

== Signatories ==
- Robert Adam
- Charles Alexander
- Philip Alexander
- Charles Broadwater
- William Brown
- John Carlyle
- Martin Cockburne
- Townsend Dade, Jr.
- John Dalton
- George Gilpin
- Henry Gunnell
- Robert Hanson Harrison
- William Hartshorne
- James Kirk
- Thomas Lewis
- George Mason
- Lee Massey
- Edward Payne
- William Payne
- Thomas Pollard
- William Ramsay
- William Rumney
- Thomas Triplett
- George Washington
- John West
