= Battersea (Petersburg, Virginia) =

Historic house in Virginia, US

- U.S. National Register of Historic Places
- Virginia Landmarks Register
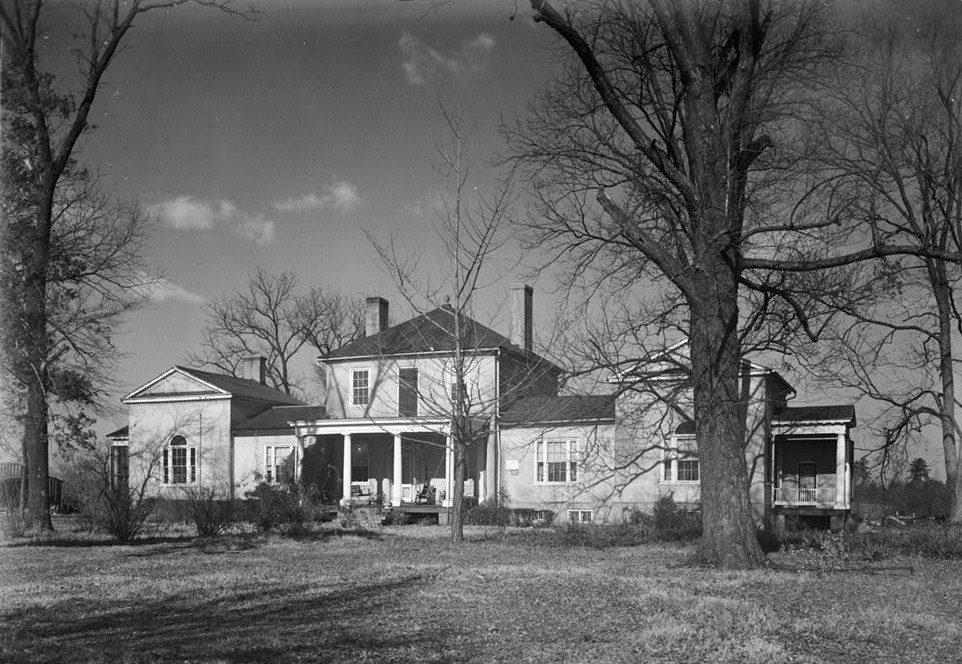
- Battersea, HABS Photo

- Location within Virginia Location within the United States
- Location: 1289 Upper Appomattox St., Petersburg, Virginia
- Coordinates: 37°13′38″N 77°25′45″W
- Area: 37 acres (15 ha)
- Built: c. 1768
- Architectural style: Anglo-Palladian
- NRHP reference No.: 69000344
- VLR No.: 123-0059

Significant dates
- Added to NRHP: November 12, 1969
- Designated VLR: May 13, 1969, December 7, 2005, April 12, 2006

Battersea is a historic plantation home located on the Appomattox River at Petersburg, Virginia. It was built in 1768 for U.S. Founding Father Colonel John Banister (1734–1788), the first mayor of Petersburg, a colonel of cavalry in the Revolutionary War, member of the Virginia House of Burgesses delegate to the Continental Congress, and signer of the Virginia Declaration of Rights, Virginia State Constitution, and the Articles of Confederation. It is a symmetrical five-part Palladian house consisting of a two-story central block topped by a pyramidal roof, one-story wings that act as hyphens, and 1 1/2-story end pavilions. Although modeled in the Palladian style, its unique character is adapted to a colonial American lifestyle. Battersea is similar in design to the Palladian mansion at Lower Brandon Plantation in nearby Prince George, also completed in the 1760s and perhaps designed by Thomas Jefferson. Although the designer of Battersea remains a mystery, he would have been conversant in European tastes of the day. Also on the property are the contributing greenhouse and a kitchen, which may have additionally served as a laundry and servants’ quarter. The brick greenhouse, or orangerie, is significant for its rarity and design. Built between 1825-1835, it is almost 190 years old and remains one of the few of its kind still in existence. The ruins of Bannister's Mill, a gristmill built in 1732, are located nearby on land that was part of Battersea plantation in the 18th century.

Battersea has been privately owned since 2006, and was purchased by the Battersea Foundation in 2011. Battersea Foundation is a nonprofit whose mission is to preserve Historic Battersea and offer educational, artistic and cultural experiences that inform, enrich and inspire the public. They host several events at Battersea throughout the year.

Battersea was listed on the National Register of Historic Places in 1969.
