= Thomas Lewis (Kentucky politician) =

American politician

Member of the Kentucky House of Representatives from Fayette County
- In office 1792–1792

Delegate to the 1792 Kentucky constitutional convention from Fayette County
- In office April 2, 1792 – April 19, 1792

Personal details
- Born: May 8, 1749 Fairfax County, Colony of Virginia
- Died: September 9, 1809 (aged 60) Olympia Springs, Bath County, Kentucky, U.S.
- Resting place: Lewis Manor graveyard, Lexington, Kentucky, U.S.
- Spouse: Elizabeth Payne
- Children: 13

Thomas Lewis (May 8, 1749 – September 9, 1809) was an American Revolutionary War veteran, early Kentucky politician and settler who was later known as Colonel Thomas Lewis. (Note: Lewis has sometimes been identified with a Continental Army officer named Thomas Lewis who served in the 15th and 11th Virginia regiments and retired in February 1781. A 2018 study by Arend Flick distinguishes that officer from Thomas Lewis (1749–1809) of Lexington and notes that no corresponding Colonel Thomas Lewis appears in Heitman's register of Continental Army officers; Flick suggests that Lewis's title may instead have reflected militia service or been honorific.) He was one of the signers of the Fairfax Resolves in 1774. He later participated in the framing of Kentucky's first constitution, represented Fayette County in Kentucky's first legislature, and administered the oath of office to the state's first governor, Isaac Shelby, in 1792.

== Early life and settlement ==
Lewis was born in Fairfax County, Virginia, on May 8, 1749. By the beginning of the American Revolution he was involved in the political affairs of Fairfax County.

In the mid-1780s, Lewis and his wife moved from Fairfax County to Kentucky. Lewis and Major Henry Payne jointly acquired a 2,000-acre military grant originally surveyed for Evan Shelby. In 1788 they divided the tract, with Lewis receiving the northern 1,000 acres on which Lewis Manor was established.

== Political career ==
At the Fairfax County meeting that adopted the Fairfax Resolves in July 1774, Lewis was one of twenty-five men named to a county committee that also included George Washington, George Mason and Lewis's father-in-law Edward Payne. The committee was empowered to call county meetings and adopt measures in response to emergencies. The body subsequently functioned as the Fairfax County Committee of Safety. (Note: The Fairfax County Committee of Safety was a local body and was distinct from the eleven-member Virginia Committee of Safety established by the Third Virginia Convention in 1775.)

After settling near Lexington, Lewis became involved in the civic government of the developing town. In 1788 he was one of seven commissioners appointed to oversee construction of Lexington's second courthouse. The commissioners selected the courthouse site on the public square and contracted for construction of the building.

In April 1792, Lewis represented Fayette County at the convention in Danville that drafted Kentucky's first state constitution. Following Kentucky's admission to the Union, Lewis was elected as one of Fayette County's nine members of the first Kentucky House of Representatives. He was also one of the first electors chosen under the state's original system for selecting members of the Kentucky Senate. Lewis administered the oath of office to Kentucky's first governor, Isaac Shelby.

Lewis simultaneously held judicial responsibilities in Fayette County. In 1792 he was one of three magistrates, with Robert Todd and John McDowell, who composed the first Fayette Court of Quarter Sessions. After Kentucky established its circuit court system, Lewis and Todd served as assistant judges of the Lexington circuit. Lewis served only a short time in that position.

After a fire destroyed the Fayette County clerk's office and many of its records in 1803, Governor James Garrard appointed Lewis and several other prominent residents as commissioners to reconstruct the lost county records from surviving copies and testimony. A later history of the Fayette County bench credited Lewis with having the surviving records recopied in the condition in which they had been left by the fire.

According to historian and author Benjamin F. Van Meter, Lewis was "possessed of considerable means when he came to Kentucky, consisting of money, slaves and livestock. He made extensive investments in lands, and soon became one of the influential and wealthy men of this region of the country. He was a very intelligent, enterprising old-fashioned Kentucky gentleman, who kept his well-trained body-servant close at hand wherever he went; was noted, like most of the gentlemen of this region and of Virginia in that day, for hospitality and high living."

== Lewis Manor ==
His home in Lexington, Lewis Manor (circa 1800), is listed on the National Register of Historic Places. Although urban development has encroached upon Lewis Manor's former rural surroundings, the historic one-story Federal house has been beautifully restored in recent years and remains in excellent condition.

Kentucky Historical Marker 1558, placed along Villey Road between Leestown Pike and Old Frankfort Pike, is titled "Early Land Grant" and reads as follows: "This spring 900 feet to the west was discovered in 1775 by Joseph Lindsay, who was killed at the Battle of Blue Licks. Spring and surrounding 2,000 acres were later surveyed for Evan Shelby, father of the first governor of Kentucky. The house on this site, 'Lewis Manor', was built by Thomas Lewis, circa 1800. Presented by Lexington-Fayette County Historic Commission."

An image of Lewis Manor is one of the homes featured on the cover of Antebellum Architecture of Kentucky, a book by Clay Lancaster.

== Personal life ==
Lewis married Elizabeth Payne on October 27, 1773. They had thirteen children. Lewis Manor remained the center of the family for decades, and all of the couple's daughters were married there.

Their children were:

- Anne Nancy Conyers Payne Lewis (1774–1835), who married James Garrard Jr., son of Kentucky governor James Garrard, at Lewis Manor on December 18, 1793. They later lived at Fairfield in Bourbon County, adjoining Governor Garrard's Mount Lebanon estate.
- Sarah "Sallie" Ann Lewis (1776–1867), who married Green Clay, a militia general, politician and wealthy landowner. Their children included Kentucky congressman and diplomat Cassius Marcellus Clay. Following Clay's death, Sallie married Jeptha Dudley, who had previously been married to her sister Elizabeth "Betsy" Lewis.
- Hector P. Lewis (1778–1857)
- Asa R. Lewis (1781–1850)
- Elizabeth "Betsy" Lewis (1782–1807), who married Jeptha Dudley.
- Edward Lewis (1785–1808)
- Catherine "Kitty" Lewis (1787–1829), who married her cousin Henry Payne and lived on the Payne estate adjoining Lewis Manor. A boundary stone between the Lewis and Payne properties bearing the initials of Thomas Lewis and Henry Payne survived on the property.
- Stephen O. Lewis (1789–1870)
- Mary "Polly" Lewis (1792–1792)
- Thornton Lewis (1794–1872)
- Sophia Lewis, who married John Telemachus Johnson, who served in the United States House of Representatives, the Kentucky legislature and the Kentucky Court of Appeals, and was a brother of Vice President Richard Mentor Johnson.
- Alpheus Lewis (1799–1865), who operated a large distillery and built Oakwood near Winchester, Kentucky, about 1820. The house was listed on the National Register of Historic Places in 1979.
- Douglas Payne Lewis (1804–1867)

Lewis's will, dated April 25, 1809, named his sons Hector, Asa, Stephen, Thornton, Alpheus and Douglas, and his daughters Nancy Garrard, Sallie Clay, Kitty Payne and Sophia Lewis. It also named his son-in-law Jeptha Dudley and grandson Edward Ambrose Dudley. The will was proved in October 1809.

Lewis died on September 9, 1809, at Olympia Springs in Bath County, Kentucky, while traveling to Virginia. His body was returned to Lexington and buried in the family graveyard at Lewis Manor. Following Elizabeth Lewis's death, Lewis Manor passed to their sons Thornton and Douglas Lewis in 1829.
