= Richard Brent (politician) =

American politician (1757–1814)

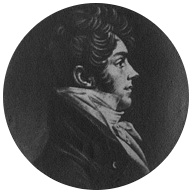

United States Senator from Virginia
- In office March 4, 1809 – December 30, 1814
- Preceded by: Andrew Moore
- Succeeded by: James Barbour

Member of the Virginia Senate from Prince William and Fairfax Counties
- In office 1808–1809
- Preceded by: John C. Hunter
- Succeeded by: William Tyler

Member of the U.S. House of Representatives from Virginia's 17th district
- In office March 4, 1801 – March 3, 1803
- Preceded by: Leven Powell
- Succeeded by: Thomas Claiborne
- In office March 4, 1795 – March 3, 1799
- Preceded by: Richard B. Lee
- Succeeded by: Leven Powell

Member of the Virginia House of Delegates from Prince William County
- In office 1800–1801
- In office 1793–1795

Member of the Virginia House of Delegates from Stafford County
- In office 1788–1789

Personal details
- Born: 1757 Stafford County, Virginia Colony, British America
- Died: December 30, 1814 (aged 56–57) Washington, D.C., U.S.
- Party: Democratic-Republican

Richard Brent (1757 – December 30, 1814) was an American planter, lawyer, and politician who represented Virginia in both the U.S. House and the U.S. Senate, and at various times Fairfax, Prince William and Stafford counties as he served at various times in both houses of the Virginia General Assembly.

== Early and family life ==
Brent was born in 1757, the eldest son of lawyer and future patriot legislator William Brent (1732-1782), at his father's plantation estate, 'Richland' on the Potomac River in Stafford County in the Colony of Virginia. Nearly a century earlier George Brent had emigrated across the Atlantic Ocean to the Virginia Colony to avoid England's Civil Wars and persecution as a Catholic and established 'Woodstock' plantation; others from that prominent Catholic family would include Margaret Brent, and Eleanor Carroll, sister of the future Archbishop John Carroll, who as a priest in Maryland crossed the Potomac River to serve the Brents and other Catholics in Northern Virginia Privately educated, Brent also read law, but never married.

== Career ==
Admitted to the Virginia bar, Brent had a private legal practice in northern Virginia. Although Virginia had several laws (including one requiring an oath the support the Church of England, which restricted Catholics from practicing law and sitting in the legislature, those were not enforced against him. Before his birth, some relatives moved to Prince William County, Virginia and established Brent Town (modern Brentsville) to avoid such anti-Catholic legislation, although such mostly grew after William Brent's death, first when it became the Prince William County government seat, and later with the development of the Orange and Alexandria Railroad.

After his father's death Brent continued his family tradition and several times won election to the Virginia House of Delegates, representing Stafford County in 1788 and representing Prince William County in 1793, 1794, 1800 and 1801.

In 1794, Brent won election to the United States House of Representatives and represented Virginia's 17th congressional district during the 4th and 5th Congresses, serving from March 1795 to March 1799, when he returned to the Virginia House of Delegates, again winning election from Prince William County. Brent again won election to the U.S. House and served another two-year term during the 7th Congress from March 1801 to March 1803. He served in the Virginia State Senate from 1808 to 1810.

Following his service in the Virginia State Senate, fellow delegates elected Brent to the United States Senate, where he served from March 1809 until his death in Washington, D.C., on December 30, 1814.

He is buried at the private Brent family cemetery near Aquia in Stafford County, Virginia.

== See also ==
- List of members of the United States Congress who died in office (1790–1899)

U.S. House of Representatives
Preceded by Richard B. Lee	Member of the U.S. House of Representatives from Virginia's 17th congressional district March 4, 1795 – March 4, 1799	Succeeded by Leven Powell
Preceded by Leven Powell	Member of the U.S. House of Representatives from Virginia's 17th congressional district March 4, 1801 – March 4, 1803	Succeeded by Thomas Claiborne
U.S. Senate
Preceded by Andrew Moore	U.S. senator (Class 1) from Virginia; March 4, 1809 – December 30, 1814; Served alongside: William B. Giles	Succeeded by James Barbour
