= Burr Harrison (patriot) =

American politician (1734–1790)

Member of the Virginia House of Delegates representing Prince William County
- In office May 4, 1778 – December 24, 1779 Serving with Jesse Ewell, John Hooe
- Preceded by: Cuthbert Bullitt
- Succeeded by: Lynaugh Helm

Personal details
- Born: June 16, 1734 Chapawomsic plantation, Prince William County, Virginia
- Died: August 2, 1790 (aged 56) Prince William County, Virginia
- Spouse: Mary Ann Barnes
- Occupation: planter, soldier, politician

Military service
- Allegiance: Continental Army
- Branch/service: Virginia Militia
- Rank: corporal
- Unit: 3rd Virginia Regiment
- Battles/wars: American Revolutionary War

Burr Harrison (June 16, 1734 – August 2, 1790) was a Virginia planter, soldier and politician who served in the Virginia militia during American Revolutionary War, then two terms in the Virginia House of Delegates representing Prince William County.

== Family ==
Coat of Arms of Burr Harrison

Born at his father's Chappawomsic plantation (other spellings include "Chippawamsic") in Prince William County in 1734, Harrison became the fifth man in his family to share the same name, although he would become the first of that name to serve in the Virginia General Assembly. His grandfather, Burr Harrison (1637–1706) had fled the armies of Oliver Cromwell and emigrated from near Winchester, England to the Virginia Colony, then became one of the negotiators with the Piscataway native Americans in 1699, established Chappawomsic plantation in what was then vast Stafford County, Virginia, where he died. He named one of his sons Burr Harrison (1668–1722), who became Burr Harrison's (patriot) father. However, his uncle Thomas Harrison (1702–1774) became the first in the immediate family to serve in the House of Burgesses, representing Prince William County (which had been created from Stafford County). A cousin born in Fauquier County (later separated from Prince William County), Burr Harrison (1738–1802) also served in the revolutionary Patriot forces and farmed using enslaved labor, but moved to South Carolina, where he died. This Harrison family is distinct from the Harrison family further south in Virginia's Tidewater region, which gave rise to Benjamin Harrison.

== Life ==
Burr Harrison received a private education appropriate for his class. He married Mary Ann Barnes, whose family also had plantations nearby, and the couple had four sons and five daughters. His daughter Sarah in 1763 married Col. Leven Powell, who would distinguish himself in the Continental Army before resigning for health reasons, then became an important politician, including serving as a presidential elector and two terms in the U.S. House of Representatives.

== American Revolutionary War ==
Having enlisted as a corporal in the Virginia militia on February 15, 1776, Harrison served under Colonel Thomas Marshall and Capt. John Francis Mercer, who led the 3rd Virginia Regiment.

== Career ==
Like his father and grandfather, Harrison farmed in Prince William County using enslaved labor. In the 1787 Virginia tax census, he owned eleven enslaved children and seven enslaved adults in Prince William County, as well as 13 horses, 30 cattle and a two-wheeled carriage.

Prince William County voters elected him to the Virginia House of Delegates in 1778 and re-elected him the following year.

== Death and legacy ==
Harrison died on August 2, 1790, and was buried in the family graveyard, now part of Quantico Marine Base. More than a century later, his descendant Burr Harrison served in the Virginia Senate and U.S. House of Representatives.

== Sources ==
Harrison DNA Patriarchs Page, Lineage 22, Subgroup 22a
