= Burr Harrison =

American politician (1904–1973)

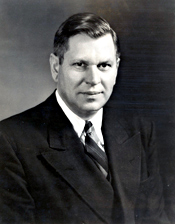

Member of the U.S. House of Representatives from Virginia's 7th district
- In office November 5, 1946 – January 3, 1963
- Preceded by: A. Willis Robertson
- Succeeded by: John O. Marsh Jr.

Member of the Virginia Senate from the 25th district
- In office January 10, 1940 – December 1942
- Preceded by: T. Russell Cather
- Succeeded by: Burgess E. Nelson

Commonwealth's Attorney for Frederick County
- In office January 1, 1932 – December 31, 1939
- Preceded by: T. Russell Cather
- Succeeded by: W. Erle Edwards

Personal details
- Born: July 2, 1904 Winchester, Virginia, U.S.
- Died: December 29, 1973 (aged 69) Winchester, Virginia, U.S.
- Party: Democratic
- Parents: Thomas W. Harrison; Nellie Cover Harrison
- Education: Hampden-Sydney College; University of Virginia; Georgetown University
- Occupation: Lawyer; judge; politician

Burr Powell Harrison (July 2, 1904 – December 29, 1973) was a Virginia lawyer, judge and Democratic politician who was a member of the Byrd Organization and served as U.S. Congressman representing Virginia's 7th congressional district (as had his father).

== Early and family life ==
Born in Winchester, Virginia to Virginia lawyer and soon-to-be Congressman Thomas W. Harrison and his wife, Burr Harrison was descended from the First Families of Virginia and named for his great-great-grandfather Burr William Harrison (1793–1865) who represented Loudoun County in the Virginia General Assembly in the 1840s and great-great-great-great-grandfather Burr Harrison (1734–1790), who represented Prince William County and fought in the American Revolutionary War. This Burr Harrison attended the public schools, then Woodberry Forest School, Virginia Military Institute, Hampden-Sydney College, and the University of Virginia. He graduated from Georgetown University Law School, Washington, D.C., in 1926.

== Career ==
Harrison was admitted to the Virginia bar the same year and commenced practice in Winchester, Virginia with his father (who died in 1935). Harrison was the attorney for Frederick County in 1932–1940. During the years 1940–1943, Harrison represented Frederick County (part-time) in Senate of Virginia. His colleagues elected him as judge of the seventeenth judicial circuit and the corporation court of Winchester in 1943–1946.

Voters of Virginia's 7th congressional district (which his father had represented during World War I and before the Great Depression) elected Harrison as a Democrat to the Seventy-ninth and to the Eightieth Congress, initially by special election to fill the vacancy caused by the resignation of United States Representative A. Willis Robertson (who successfully ran for election as U.S. Senator). Burr was elected in November 1946 and so was not sworn in to the House until the Eightieth Congress convened. Voters reelected Harrison to the seven succeeding Congresses (November 5, 1946 – January 3, 1963).

Harrison was appointed to the exclusive Ways and Means Committee in the Eighty-second Congress and returned to after the hiatus of the Republican Eighty-third Congress. "He put in hard work on an effort to revise the Hatch Act that governed civil service employment; a revision that amounted to a voluntary Federal Fair Employment bill was eventually produced. He was handed the chairship of the Subcommittee on Administration of Social Security Laws, which required a level of activity on a very public and very important government service for a great many people. Four of his tax bills became law. With the new Kennedy Administration’s push for what eventually became Medicare, Harrison came up with his own plan, which would have provided catastrophic coverage, though his plan never amounted to a bill."

He was a member of the House Un-American Activities Committee during the McCathy era. Like his father, Harrison was a member of the Byrd Organization led by Virginia's U.S. Senator Harry F. Byrd (of Winchester) and accordingly supported Massive Resistance to the U.S. Supreme Court decisions in Brown v. Board of Education. He signed the 1956 Southern Manifesto that opposed the desegregation of public schools.

Harrison did not seek his party's renomination to the Eighty-eighth Congress in 1962, but instead resumed his legal practice in Winchester, Virginia. He said being a congressman was a young man's job because of strenuous work and long hours. Fellow Democrat John O. Marsh, Jr. succeeded to the Congressional seat.

== Death and legacy ==
Harrison died in Winchester on December 29, 1973, and was interred in Winchester's Mount Hebron Cemetery.

== Electoral history ==
- 1946; Harrison was elected to the U.S. House of Representatives in a special election with 62.53% of the vote, defeating Republican Karl Jenkins. He was simultaneously elected in the general election with 62.32% of the vote, defeating Republican Jenkins.
- 1948; Harrison was re-elected with 60.43% of the vote, defeating Republican Stephen D. Timberlake.
- 1950; Harrison was re-elected with 69.41% of the vote, defeating Republican Jacob A. Garber.
- 1952; Harrison was re-elected with 79.09% of the vote, defeating Republican Glenn W. Ruebush.
- 1954; Harrison was re-elected with 74.17% of the vote, defeating Republican John P. Ruddick.
- 1956; Harrison was re-elected with 69.04% of the vote, defeating Republican A.R. Dunning.
- 1958; Harrison was re-elected with 76.64% of the vote, defeating Independent Henry A. Oder.
- 1960; Harrison was re-elected unopposed.

== See also ==
- List of members of the House Un-American Activities Committee

== Sources ==
- United States Congress. "Burr Harrison (id: H000264)". Biographical Directory of the United States Congress.

U.S. House of Representatives
Preceded by A. Willis Robertson	Member of the U.S. House of Representatives from Virginia's 7th congressional district 1946–1963	Succeeded by John O. Marsh, Jr.
