= Valentine Peyton =

Virginia plantation owner and military officer (1687–1751)

Member of the House of Burgesses from Prince William County
- In office 1736-1740 Serving with Thomas Osborne, Peter Hedgman
- Preceded by: Dennis McCarty
- Succeeded by: William Fairfax

Personal details
- Born: 1686 Westmoreland County, Virginia Colony, British America
- Died: 1751 Prince William County, Virginia, U.S.
- Spouse(s): Anne; Frances Linton
- Children: seven including Henry Peyton, Francis Peyton
- Occupation: Planter, politician

Valentine Peyton (1687–October 1, 1751), was a Virginia planter and military officer who served in the House of Burgesses representing Prince William County (part-time) from 1736 through 1740, as well as in local offices. As explained below, he was named for a great-uncle who emigrated to the Virginia colony and served as a burgess for then-vast Westmoreland County in 1663-64.

== Early and family life ==
This Valentine Peyton was born in Westmoreland County to the former Anne Thornton and her planter husband, Henry Peyton (b.1656). He was named to honor his great-uncle, Col. Valentine Peyton (1627-1665), who had served in the British Royal Army after graduating from Trinity College in 1647, then emigrated to the Virginia colony by 1652 when he patented 1000 acres on Aquia Creek for transporting 20 indentured servants to the colony. That Valentine Peyton, a younger son of Henry Peyton of Lincoln's Inn in London (1590-1656), was also an attorney and served in the House of Burgesses in 1663-64, as well as Colonel of the Westmoreland County militia before his death in 1665, and the death of his sole son in 1687 (he had married the widow Frances Gerrard Speake, who would subsequently outlive husbands Capt. John Appleton and Col. John Washington as well as marry William Hardidge, all of whom served as burgesses at various times). The earlier Valentine Peyton had convinced his younger brother (this man's grandfather) Henry Peyton Sr. (1631-after 1659) to emigrate to the Virginia Colony, and more than 20 relations would share the name "Valentine Peyton" in northern Virginia in the 17th and 18th centuries. This Valentine Peyton had several siblings, including a brother John to whom he sold half of a 200-acre parcel on Aquia Creek in 1728.

He married twice, first in 1725 to Anne, whose original surname has not survived but who bore children. After her death, Peyton remarried, to Frances Linton, daughter of merchant Moses Linton. She emigrated from Scotland and bore several children, including Henry (b. 1725) who served in the House of Burgesses and administered his father's will, and Francis Peyton (b. 1733), who would serve many years in the Virginia General Assembly representing Loudoun County. One family genealogist names other siblings or half-siblings as Eleanor (c. 1720) who married Willliam Powell Jr., Valentine Jr., Robert who married Anne Guffey by 1765, John (b. 1728) who married Seth Harrison and Craven (b. 1732) who married Ann West.

== Career ==
Beginning around 1711, Peyton began buying land in what became Prince William County, and in 1728 sold half of a 200-acre tract on Aquia Creek that he had inherited from their father (probably surrounding "Stony Hill") to his brother John. Like his grandfather, father and brothers, Valentine Peyton operated those plantations using indentured and (increasingly) enslaved labor. In 1736, he, Richard Blackburn and Bertrand Ewell certified the accounts of the estate of William Linton (either his father-in-law or brother-in-law), which included several enslaved adults and children.

The Virginia General Assembly established Prince William County in 1731, and Prince William County voters elected Valentine Peyton as one of their representatives in the House of Burgesses in 1736, the year the assembly expelled his co-burgess Thomas Osborne. In that year the legislature authorized building of a tobacco warehouse. Peyton was first elected a justice of the peace for Prince William county in 1738 and served until 1743. He also was elected the Prince William County sheriff in 1749. He also became a warden of Dettingen Parish in 1745 and a vestryman in 1749.

However, Peyton became involved in controversy. In 1740 fellow burgesses censured him and two other Prince William justices of the peace for refusing to certify two petitions of constituents to the General Court in Williamsburg, thus depriving them of their right to petition the government for redress of grievances. The petitions might have been circulated by Scottish-born local merchants who wanted a new town established on Quantico Creek (near the present Quantico Marine Base), but which Peyton wanted built on his land by the courthouse. In 1749 the General Assembly chartered the town as Dumfries, Virginia (to honor the Scottish port). During the controversy, Prince William voters elected William Fairfax as Peyton's successor, and Fairfax also shepherded through the creation of Fairfax County in 1741, before being elevated to the Governor's Council (upper house of the assembly)].

== Death and legacy ==
Peyton died in 1751 and his eldest surviving son Henry was appointed executor of his estate. Henry Peyton would also serve as a burgess for Prince William County, although the member of this branch of the family with the longest legislative service in Prince William County would be John Henry Peyton. Although Dumfries' port silted up by the end of the century, and it lost its position as county seat, Dumfries is now the oldest chartered town in Virginia.

Several of Valentine Peyton's children would continue the westward movement. His son John Peyton and youngest son Francis Peyton moved tot Loudoun County, which Francis would represent in the House of Burgesses, Virginia Conventions and Virginia House of Delegates. This man's grandson Col. Leven Powell, who served in the Continental Line during the Revolutionary War, supported ratification of the federal Constitution, donated acreage to found Middleburg (the Loudoun County seat) and also served a term in the U.S. Congress. A great-grandson, Dr. Samuel Oldham Peyton (1804-1870) was born in Bullitt County, Kentucky and served in the Kentucky House of Representatives as well as in the U.S. Congress before the Civil War.
