= Tuscarora, Maryland =

Unincorporated community in Maryland, United States

- Unincorporated community
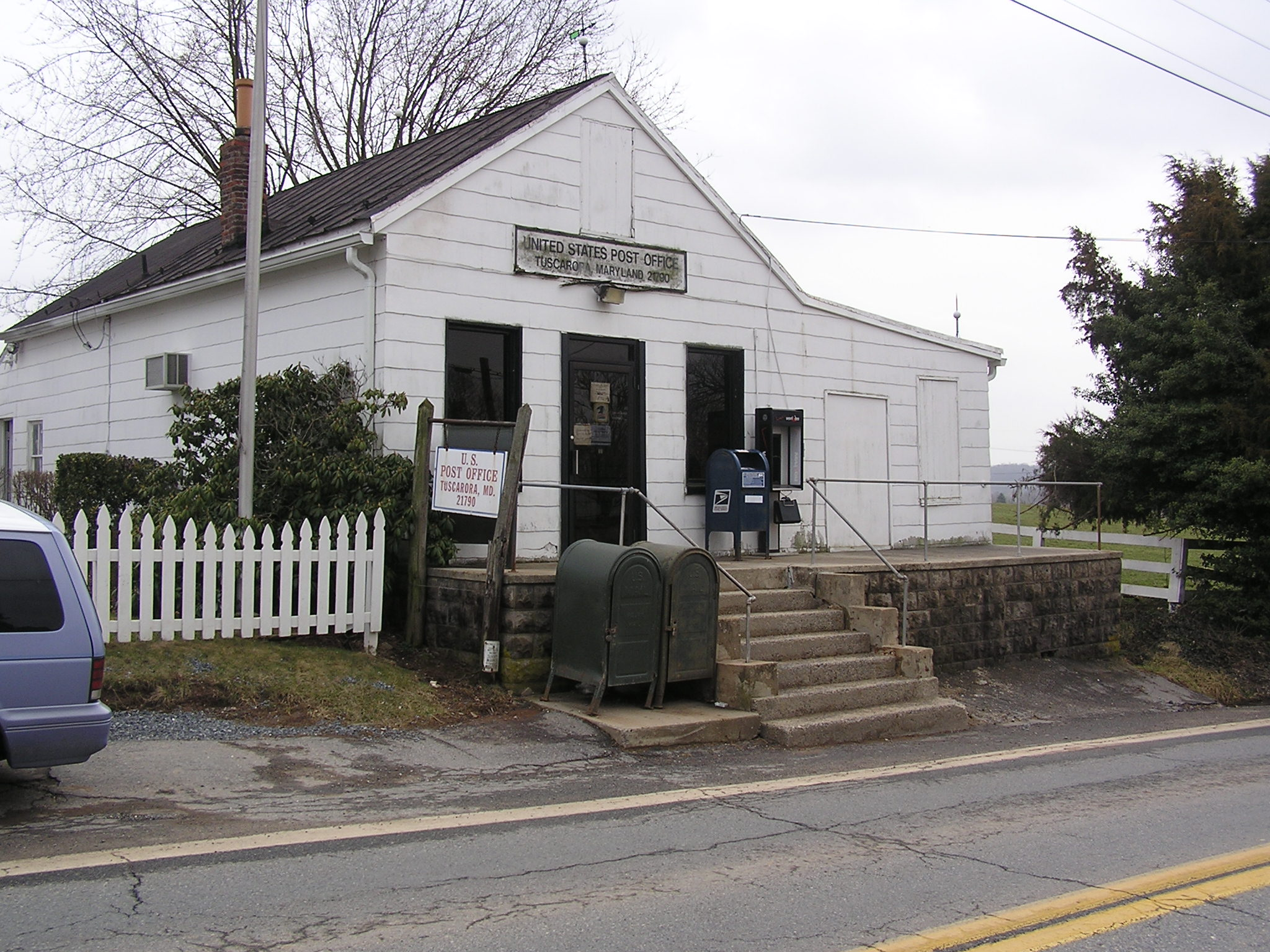
- The Tuscarora post office in March 2004

- Location in Maryland Tuscarora (the United States)
- Coordinates: 39°15′24″N 77°28′13″W
- Country: United States
- State: Maryland
- County: Frederick
- Elevation: 292 ft (89 m)
- GNIS feature ID: 591442

Tuscarora is a small unincorporated community in southern Frederick County, in the U.S. state of Maryland. Maryland Route 28 runs through the village. The community was named for Tuscarora Creek that runs in the area. There is an old, small post office that is in the area along Route 28. The area was formerly named "Licksville" after another creek in the area. It is bordered by Point of Rocks to the west and Adamstown to the north. The Nolands Ferry I Archeological Site was listed on the National Register of Historic Places in 1985.
