= Nolands Ferry I Archeological Site =

Coordinates: 39°15′N 77°29′W

- U.S. National Register of Historic Places
- Location within Maryland Location within the United States
- Nearest city: Tuscarora, Maryland
- NRHP reference No.: 85003152
- Added to NRHP: October 18, 1985

Nolands Ferry I Archeological Site is an archaeological site near the historic Noland's Ferry boat landing at mile 44.58 on the C&O Canal and Tuscarora. The Archeological Site is a prehistoric occupation site located in the Monocacy region of southern Frederick County, Maryland. Diagnostic artifacts at the site indicate that the site was almost continuously inhabited from the Paleo-Indian period to the early 19th century, with the most substantial inhabitation occurring during the Late Woodland period.

The site was listed on the National Register of Historic Places in 1985.

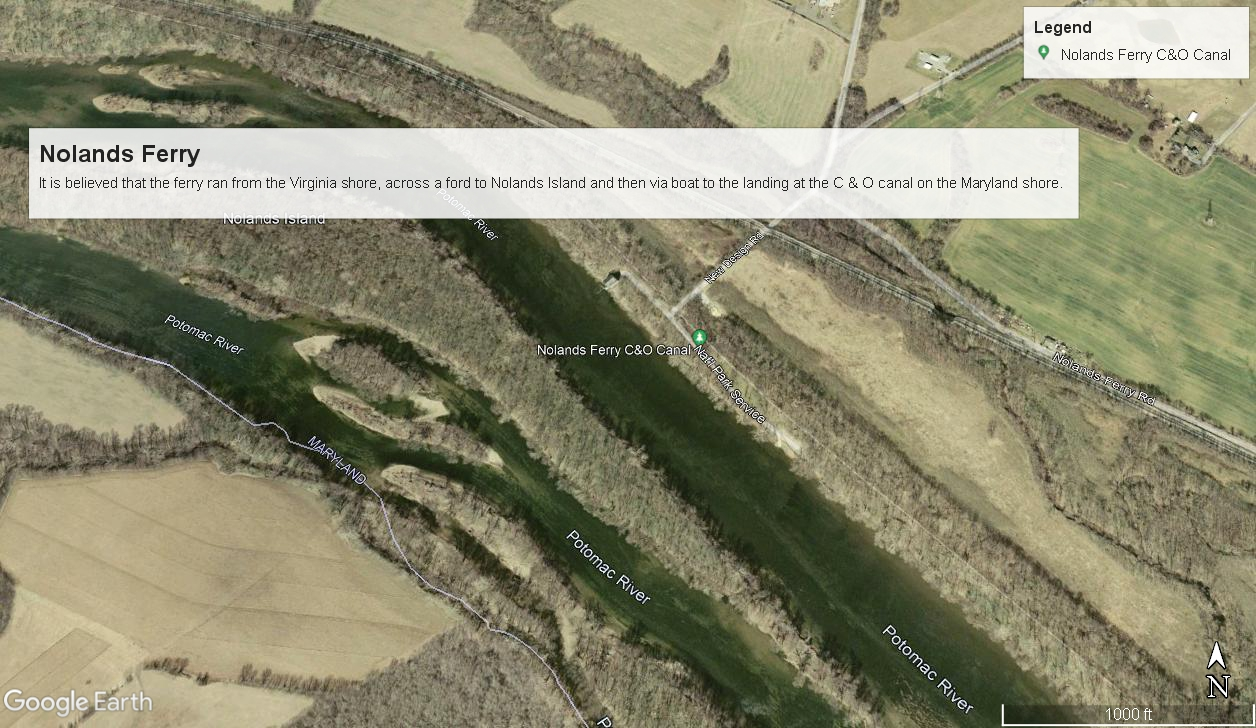
Nolands Ferry and Nolands Island

Noland's Ferry, for which the site is named, has a broad history from the mid-1700s, with some of America's founding leaders among its customers.

== Ferry history ==
Noland's Ferry began operating in the mid-1700s and carried travelers, their wagons, carriages and livestock across the Potomac River between Loudoun County, Virginia and Frederick County, Maryland. During the American Revolutionary War it was used by the U. S. Army and during the Civil War, by the armies of both the North and South. The ferry remained in operation until the early 1900s. Philip Noland was the first Noland to run the ferry and his wife was the daughter of Francis Awbrey (also Aubrey). Awbrey was granted a license for a ferry in 1738 which ran near the Noland Ferry crossing site. The family ferry business got its start at that time and their son Thomas continued to run Noland's Ferry. Thomas Noland's wife Mary Eleanor Luckett is the daughter of William Luckett who had a nearby ferry that Thomas took over.

The first original record that mentions Noland's Ferry pre-dates Loudoun County and is in the Fairfax County records of March 20, 1754. The registration for the Catoctin Rural Historic District, section 8 page 3, states that "... As early as 1748 Philip Noland had established a ferry at the site...". In 1756, in a political infight, Philip Noland was denied a license to operate the ferry by the Virginia House of Burgesses which awarded a license to Josiah Clapham (who was a voting member of that legislature). In 1778 Clapham's license was discontinued and Philip Noland, who appears to have stayed in business without a Virginia license, was awarded one. Because the Potomac River is totally in Maryland, as is Noland's Island, approval from Virginia's House of Burgesses appears not to have been critical.

In the yellow fever epidemic of 1793, in an attempt to keep the fever out of Virginia, the governor ordered that Nolands and six other Potomac ferries limit travel for those coming from Philadelphia who were required to wait on the Maryland side of the river for six days and were only allowed to proceed if they were without symptoms.

=== Potomac River crossing ===
Travel between Virginia and Maryland necessitated crossing the Potomac River, the fourth largest east coast river, which has always been an obstacle for travel over land. Several ferries were established to serve that area and Noland's Ferry ran from Leesburg to Maryland for over 150 years. Noland's Ferry Road leads to a boat ramp on the C&O canal outside Washington, D.C., which was the ferry's Maryland location. In Leesburg, just across the river, the location is marked by Noland's Ferry Road and a house on that road which was built around 1800 by a Noland who ran the ferry. Noland's Island is nearby in the Potomac River.

==== Carolina Road ====
The ferry was often used by travelers heading to the Carolinas. The location of the Carolina Road in Northern Virginia is near today's Route 15. In the 1700s, Noland's Ferry was a link between the Virginia and Maryland sections of the Carolina Road.

=== Revolutionary War ===
Noland and Luckett family members were strong supporters of American independence. William Luckett was a colonel in the Maryland militia and Thomas No[w]land fought in the Maryland "Flying Camp", a quick response group. Thomas Hussey Luckett and David Luckett were members of the Continental Army. During the Revolutionary War, the American army sent troops and POWs across the ferry and stored munitions in the ferry warehouses.

=== Washington and Jefferson ===
George Washington and Thomas Jefferson were among the ferry's customers. Jefferson noted that he went via Noland's Ferry in July 1802 on the way from Washington to Monticello and Washington wrote in his diary that he ate at "Knowlands Ferry" on August 9, 1785.

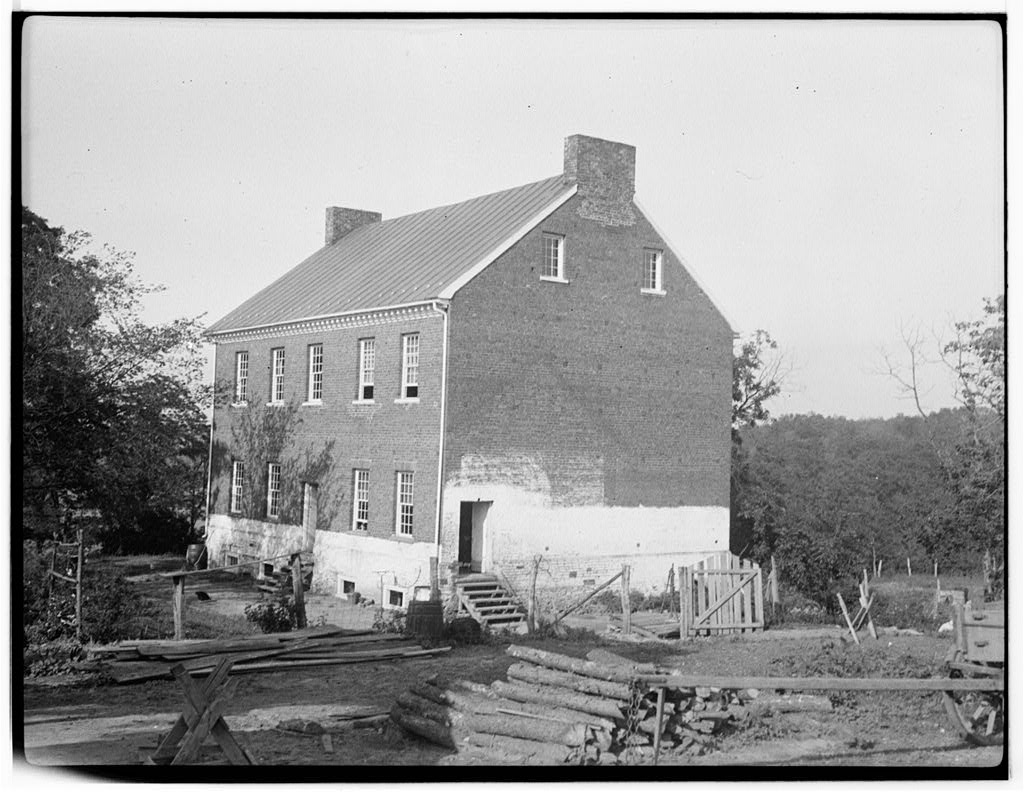
Noland Ferry house, Leesburg, VA

=== Unfinished ferry house ===
Sometime after the Revolutionary War ended, a large house was built on the grounds of the ferry and although construction was completed enough to be weathertight, key elements of the house were not finished, including interior woodwork and plaster. The house remained unfinished until the 1950s and the mystery as to why was the subject of a Washington Star magazine article in 1949 with the inaccurate title "200 Year Old House That Was Never Finished".
