= Francis Peyton =

American politician

Member of the Virginia Senate from Loudoun and Fauquier Counties
- In office 1791-1811
- Preceded by: Stevens Thomson Mason
- Succeeded by: John Scott

Member of the Virginia House of Delegates from Loudoun County
- In office 1784-1787 Serving with Richard Bland Lee
- Preceded by: Stevens Thomson Mason
- Succeeded by: Leven Powell
- In office 1780-1783 Serving with Josiah Clapham, John Alexander, John Carter
- Preceded by: Leven Powell
- Succeeded by: Stevens Thomson Mason
- In office 1776 Serving with Josiah Clapham
- Preceded by: position established
- Succeeded by: Thomson Mason

Member of the House of Burgesses from Loudoun County
- In office 1769-1775 Serving with James Hamilton, Josiah Clapham, Thomson Mason
- Preceded by: Francis Lightfoot Lee
- Succeeded by: position abolished

Personal details
- Born: June 27, 1733 Prince William County, Virginia Colony, British America
- Died: between 1811 and 1815 Leesburg, Loudoun County, Virginia, U.S.
- Spouse: Frances Dade
- Occupation: Planter, politician

Francis H. Peyton (June 27, 1733 – c. 1815) was a Virginia planter and patriot in the American Revolutionary War, and who represented Loudoun County, Virginia in the House of Burgesses, Virginia Conventions and both houses of the Virginia General Assembly.

His nephew of the same name, Francis Peyton (1751 or 1764 – 1836) was a Revolutionary War captain and paymaster who became a prominent Alexandria merchant and politician (serving on its city council (1794-1797) and as mayor (1797-1798)) and corresponded with Thomas Jefferson.

== Early and family life ==
Born in Prince William County in 1733 (two years after its formation) to the former Frances Linton, Francis was among the youngest sons of Col. Valentine Peyton, a planter who served in various county offices and in the House of Burgesses, as would his eldest son (this man's eldest brother) Henry (circa 1720-1781). Francis Peyton outlived not only Henry but his brothers John Peyton (1728-1774) and Craven Peyton (1732-1777). Like his brothers, Francis Peyton received a private education appropriate to his class. His eldest sister, Eleanor Peyton, married William Powell Jr., a Maryland ship captain and commissary during the American Revolutionary War who bought land in Prince William and neighboring Loudoun County, as did their son (this man's nephew), Leven Powell. Several more of this man's nephews would fight as patriots in that conflict.

In April 1755, at St. Paul's church in what had become King George County, Peyton married Frances Dade (1734-1814). (Note: Various sources list her mother's surname as Hooe or Massey, both of them prominent landholding families in the region.) Her father Henry Dade was a prominent landowner, though members of that family would not win a seat in the Virginia General Assembly until 1807. Meanwhile, the couple had five daughters before the birth of their first son, Dr. Francis Peyton Jr. (who died in Leesburg in December 1808 in a duel with William Littlejohn, the son of the town's longtime Methodist minister). Thus, only their final child Townsend Dade Peyton (1774-1852), daughters and grandchildren survived their parents. Their daughters Margaret and Ann did not marry: Ann cared for her father in his final years and received the family plantation to support her in her final years. Her sister Elizabeth Peyton married William Hale, Letitia Peyton married Leven Luckett and Mary Peyton married Mr. Waugh; they all had children remembered in this man's will. Dr. Francis Peyton in 1802 had married the widowed niece of the late President George Washington, Francis Thornton Washington Ball (1763-1815), and helped raise her children from her previous marriage, but their only child together, Adeleide (1803-1805) died as an infant. Townsend Dade Peyton, who became his father's executor, married twice and had several grandchildren. One son by his first wife, Harriet Colston Beale, Robert Peyton accidentally shot himself, his elder brother Alfred Peyton may have served in the Confederate States Army, and their daughter Frances Dade Peyton married CSA General Joseph R. Davis. At some time after his second marriage in 1822, to Sarah Yates (1800–1864) of King George County, Townsend Peyton sold his slaves and moved down the Ohio river to Oxford, Ohio where he died, although his only son by that second marriage, Col. Robert Ludwell Yates Peyton (1822-1863) never married and became a member of the Confederate States Senate and Colonel of the 3rd Missouri Cavalry, and died in 1863 of malaria incurred defending Vicksburg, Mississippi.

== Career ==
When the Virginia General Assembly created Loudoun County from Prince William County in 1757, Francis Peyton became one of the new county's thirteen judges (who served administrative as well as judicial roles). Voters first elected him as one of Loudoun County's representatives in the House of Burgesses in 1769, then began a string of re-elections to that part time position. In 1769-1771 he served alongside James Hamilton until the latter resigned to become the county coroner in 1770, then Peyton served alongside Josiah Clapham, then in 1772-1774 alongside Thomson Mason and in 1775-1776 again alongside Josiah Clapham.

When Loudoun County voters held a meeting to discuss the Boston Tea Party on June 14, 1774, drafting the Loudoun Resolves, Peyton presided. Peyton and Clapham then served with Leven Powell and thirteen other men on the Committee of Safety. After Governor Lord Dunmore suppressed the Virginia legislature, Loudoun County voters continued to elect Peyton and Clapham as their representatives to all five Virginia Conventions (with Thomson Mason as the county's third representative at the first revolutionary convention). Following the creation of the Virginia House of Delegates, he and Clapham jointly represented Loudoun County for one more term.

After the war concluded, voters in Loudoun again elected Peyton to the House of Delegates in 1779, but he instead chose to serve as the county's land commissioner, then reconsidered in 1780, and voters again elected and re-elected him to represent Loudoun County in the House of Delegates, where he served alongside Josiah Clapham then John Alexander and John Carter before failing to win re-election in 1783 Peyton then again won one of the seats representing Loudoun county in 1784, and served three terms alongside Richard Bland Lee. In 1791, voters in Loudoun and neighboring Fauquier Counties elected Peyton to the state senate, and again continued to re-elect him until his death.

Peyton farmed using enslaved labor. He owned nine enslaved children under age 16 and 10 enslaved adults in the 1787 Virginia tax census. The federal census of 1810 also enumerated his slaves. He also bought land near Licking Creek in Kentucky, that in his will he bequeathed to his son Townsend.

== Death and legacy ==
Peyton died in Leesburg, probably in late 1815, for the will he had written in 1810 was formally presented to the probate court on January 8, 1816. (Note: Townsend "Paton" owned 19 slaves and Nancy "Paton" owned 8 slaves in Loudoun County in the 1820 census.) He was buried in the Ball Burying Ground in Loudoun County.
