= Bolling Starke =

Bolling Starke (September 21, 1733 – January 25, 1788) was a member of the House of Burgesses in 1761 and 1770. He was a prominent figure in the American Revolution, a delegate of the Convention of 1776. Thomas Jefferson appointed him to be an auditor in 1781. He was on the Governor's Council.

== Early years ==
Bolling Starke was the son of Mary Bolling (born 1708) and Dr. Richard Starke, who moved within Virginia to Prince George County from York County. Starke's parents were married in 1727. His father died in 1755. Starke was born September 21, 1733, in Petersburg, Virginia. His siblings were William and Robert.

== Marriage ==
Starke married Elizabeth Belfield, born in 1732, and they had a daughter Elizabeth, born in 1755. She married John Williamson in 1780. Daughter Elizabeth died in 1800 and John died in 1820.

== Career ==
Starke was a member of the House of Burgesses, representing Dinwiddie, from 1761 to 1770. He was a prominent figure in the American Revolution, a delegate of the Convention of 1776. Thomas Jefferson appointed him to be a State Auditor in 1781. He was on the Governor's Council.

== Death ==
Elizabeth died in 1782 and Starke died on January 25, 1788, in Dinwiddie, Virginia.
