= Henry Peyton (burgess) =

Member of the House of Burgesses from Prince William County
- Preceded by: Henry Lee
- Succeeded by: John Baylis
- In office 1756-1761

Personal details
- Born: 1725 Prince William County, Virginia Colony, British America
- Died: 1781 Prince William County, Virginia, U.S.
- Spouse(s): Anne Thornton; Margaret Gallagher
- Relations: Francis Peyton
- Occupation: Planter, politician

Henry James Peyton (1725–1781), nicknamed "Colonel Harry Peyton" was a Virginia planter and military officer who served in the House of Burgesses representing Prince William County, as well as in local offices.

== Early and family life ==
He was born to the former Frances Linton and her planter husband, Valentine Peyton. He was named to honor his grandfather, royalist emigrant great grandfather, and great-great grandfather, a barrister of Lincoln's Inn. He had several siblings, of whom his younger brother Francis Peyton would become known as a patriot during the American Revolutionary War and follow family tradition by serving in the Virginia General Assembly.

He married twice, first in 1747 to Anne Thornton, who bore children. After he death, Peyton remarried in 1757 to Margaret Gallagher.

== Career ==
Like his father and grandfather, Harry Peyton operated plantations using enslaved labor.

He was elected the Prince William County sheriff in 1751 (the year of his father's death), and three years later was elected one of the justices of the peace who governed the county. He also served as county lieutenant (leading the local militia) in 1755. Harry Peyton was first elected as one of Prince William County's representatives in the House of Burgesses in 1756, after the courts invalidated the election of Harry Lee, and won re-election in 1758. The other Prince William County burgess in 1756 was John Bell, and in 1758 through 1760, Harry Peyton served alongside Henry Lee.

== Death and legacy ==
Peyton's will was admitted to probate on August 6, 1781.
