= James Henry (Continental Congress) =

American judge

Delegate from Virginia to the Continental Congress
- In office 1780–1781

Member of the Virginia House of Delegates for Accomac County
- In office May 3, 1779 – April 30, 1780 Serving with John Teacle
- Preceded by: Isaac Smith
- Succeeded by: Thomas Bailey
- In office October 7, 1776 – May 3, 1778 Serving with Southey Simpson, James Arbuckle
- Preceded by: position created
- Succeeded by: Isaac Smith

Member of the House of Burgesses
- In office 1772–1774 Serving with Southey Simpson
- Preceded by: Thomas Parramore
- Succeeded by: Isaac Smith

Personal details
- Born: 1731 Aberdeen, Scotland, Kingdom of Great Britain
- Died: December 9, 1804 (aged 72–73) "Fleet's Bay" plantation, Northumberland County, Virginia
- Spouse: Sarah Scarburgh
- Children: at least 3 sons and 3 daughters
- Education: University of Edinburgh
- Occupation: lawyer, politician, judge

James Henry (1731 – December 9, 1804) was an American lawyer from Aberdeen, Great Britain. He moved to Virginia, where he was a delegate to the Continental Congress and later becoming a judge in the newly independent United States. He immigrated from Aberdeen, Scotland to Pennsylvania then Virginia's Eastern Shore, where he practiced law and held legislative offices (including of the House of Burgesses, House of Delegates and Continental Congress) before becoming a judge of the Virginia court of admiralty and of the Virginia General Court.

== Early life and education ==
James Henry was born in Aberdeen, Scotland. One source claimed his grandfather Alexander Henry married Jean Robinson, who descended from James I of Scotland. Henry studied law at the University of Edinburgh before moving to the British colonies in North America. He started working in Pennsylvania before he settled on the eastern shore of Virginia in Accomack County.

== Career ==
Henry received payment in 1761 for surveying Onancock town and may have built a still-existing historic house known as "Sea View" about 1762, but which was extensively renovated circa 1805. Other Accomack properties he and his wife owned included 50 acres and a mill acquired from Joseph Custis and his wife in 1770 (which Henry split and sold in 1784 and 1791), 487.5 acres acquired from John Thompson about 1760 (sold to Major John Savage in 1788), 100 acres from Thomas Bayly and wife in 1766 (resold to James Arbuckle), 864 acres from the estate of William Andrews (resold in 1776 to Nathaniel Savage), and 300 acres formerly owned by Hancock Custis (which Henry deeded to Samuel Wilson).

Meanwhile, Henry also began a political career. Accomack County voters elected Henry as one of their representative to the Virginia House of Burgesses in 1772, where he served alongside Southey Simpson, but was replaced by Isaac Smith in 1775. Despite the Royal Governor of Virginia dissolving the House of Burgesses, Henry chaired a meeting with other elected members at Accomack Courthouse. During the meeting, they declared allegiance to King George III but also demanded their liberties and rights of Englishmen and protested against the Parliament of Great Britain's actions in Boston, Massachusetts. That assembly also resolved to push for reconciliation between the colonies and the British authorities.

After British Governor Lord Dunmore dissolved the legislature, Accomac voters elected Henry together with Southey Simpson and Isaac Smith to the First Virginia Revolutionary Convention, although only Simpson and Smith were representatives to the Second, Third and Fourth Revolutionary Conventions. Following the declaration of independence, Accomack voters elected Henry as their representative to the Virginia House of Delegates in 1776-78 and with a gap, again in 1779. Fellow legislators first elected Henry as one of Virginia's representatives to the Continental Congress on December 17, 1779, but he did not appear at a session until April 1780. Although Henry was elected again the following year, he attended no other sessions.

In 1779, Virginia legislators appointed Henry a judge of the court of admiralty and thus a judge of the first Court of Appeals. In 1789, when the Court of Appeals was reorganized, he was made a judge of the general court, where he served until 1800.

During his judicial service, Henry moved to a house he called "Fleet's Bay" in nearby Northumberland County, Virginia, presumably after he represented Accomac County in the House of Delegates. In the 1787 Virginia tax census for Northampton County, Henry owned 19 enslaved adults and 14 teenagers, as well as 14 horses, 71 cattle and 6 conveyances with a total of wheels including a phaeton and chair, and also paid taxes for two men who may have been "free negroes".

== Personal life ==
Henry married Sarah Scarburgh, who was descended from the First Families of Virginia. Their children who reached adulthood married within that class. Eldest son Samuel H. Henry married Mary Beale and inherited "Pleasant Hill" plantation in King and Queen County, formerly the home of Speaker John Robinson; Edward Hugh Henry married Martha Catherine Henry, daughter of Governor Patrick Henry, and after her death married Elizabeth Washington Peyton, and John Henry moved to "Woodlawn" plantation in Halifax County after marrying another Beale sister. Daughter Mary married prominent Eastern Shore politician John Wise (who by his second wife became the father of Virginia governor John Wise); her sister Tabitha married Hancock Eustace, and Elizabeth married William Moncure of what later became Stafford County.

== Death and legacy ==
Henry died on December 9, 1804 at his home, Fleet's Bay. His last will and testament which he had prepared in 1801 was admitted to probate in 1805.
