= Josiah Clapham =

Virginia colonial politician

Josiah Clapham (also spelled Josias; died 1803) was a colonial merchant, military officer, and politician in Virginia who served as a member of the House of Burgesses and later the Virginia General Assembly, representing Loudoun County.

== Biography ==
Born in Virginia, Clapham served as a lieutenant in the Virginia militia beginning in the 1750s. Clapham had a variety of business ventures, including a water mill, warehouse, mercantile, and ferry.

In 1757, Clapham was approved with a license to operate the Potomac Crossing Ferry. He convinced the government of Virginia to approve a less expensive toll. He was one of the founding trustees of the Town of Leesburg, Virginia in 1758. In 1776, Clapham was a delegate to the Fifth Virginia Convention which established its first constitution and the Virginia Declaration of Rights. In 1778, Clapham's ferry license was discontinued. Clapham served as a member of the House of Burgesses from 1771 to 1779 and as a member of the Virginia General Assembly from 1779 to 1788. During the American Revolutionary War, Clapham served as a colonel and member of the Loudoun County Committee of Safety.

In 1779, Clapham purchased the 200-acre Chestnut Hill estate in Loudoun County, Virginia. In 1790, Clapham was one of the first trustees of Matildaville, Virginia. Clapham died in 1803.
