= John Banister (lawyer) =

American Founding Father and lawyer

Colonel John Banister
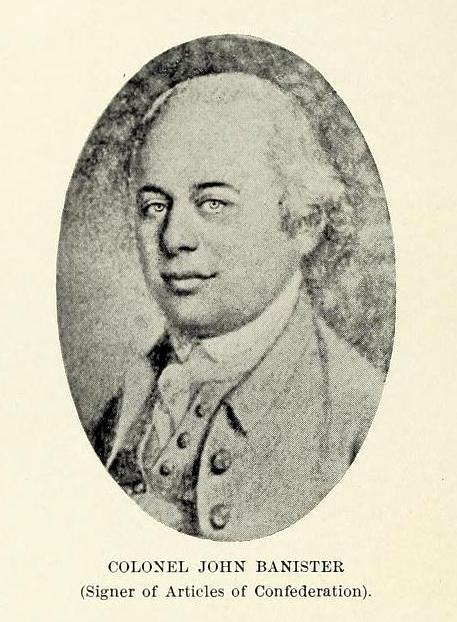
- Portrait in The History of the Blair, Banister, and Braxton Families Before and After the Revolution by Frederick Horner, 1898

Virginia House of Burgesses
- In office 1765–1769
- In office 1772–1775

Virginia House of Delegates
- In office 1776–1778
- In office 1781–1784

Second Continental Congress
- In office March 1778 – September 1779

Mayor (1st), Petersburg, Virginia
- In office 1785–1786

Personal details
- Born: December 26, 1734 Hatcher's Run Dinwiddie County, Virginia
- Died: September 30, 1788 (aged 53) Virginia, United States
- Resting place: Hatcher's Run Plantation
- Spouse(s): Elizabeth Bland (married circa. 1760s); Ann Blair (married Feb 26, 1779)
- Parents: Captain John Banister (father); Wilmuth (mother)
- Education: Middle Temple, London, England
- Occupation: Politician; Lawyer; Continental Army Officer

John Banister (December 26, 1734 – September 30, 1788) was an American Founding Father, lawyer, planter, and slave owner from Petersburg, Virginia. As a member of the Second Continental Congress, he signed the Articles of Confederation, which became the nation's first constitution in 1781.

== Life ==
The son of Captain John Banister and grandson of John Banister the naturalist, he was educated at Middle Temple in London, England, admitted on September 27, 1753. Banister served in the House of Burgesses (1765–1769, 1772–1775), Virginia House of Delegates (1776–1778, 1781–1784), and Second Continental Congress (1778–1779). While a delegate to the Continental Congress, he was a framer of the Articles of Confederation, which he signed on July 8, 1778. Banister also had served as a member of the Virginia Conventions, which declared Virginia an independent state in 1776. He was appointed the first mayor of Petersburg in 1784.

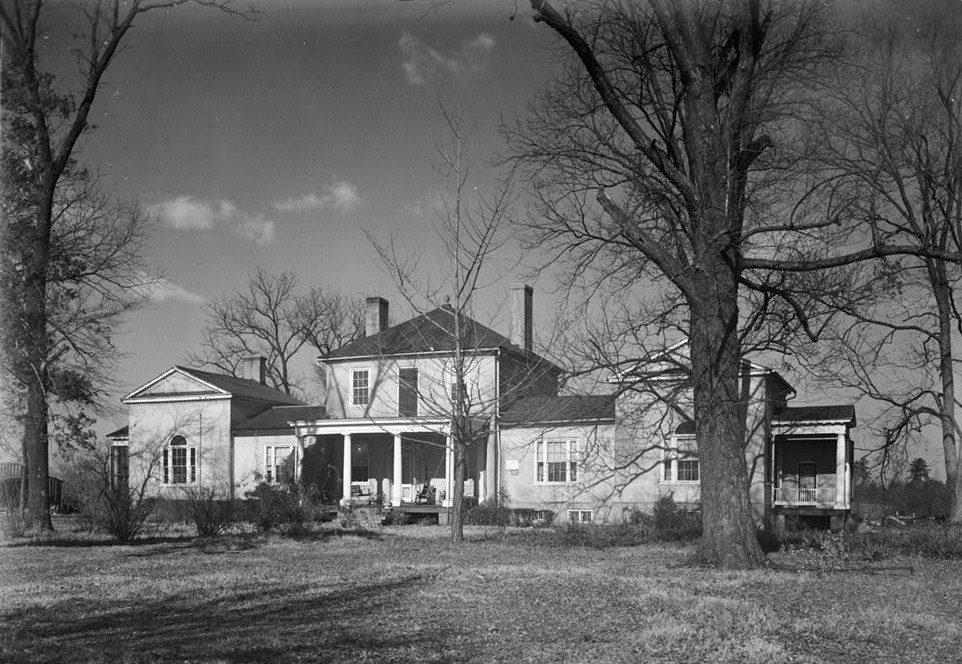
Battersea Plantation, Petersburg, Virginia

Banister was married twice. He first he married Elizabeth Bland, the daughter of Theodorick Bland of Cawsons and the sister of Colonel Theodorick Bland. His first wife died in 1777, and two years later Banister married Ann Blair of Williamsburg, daughter of John Blair Sr.

Banister's suburban villa in Petersburg, Battersea, was built around 1768 in a five-part Palladian style. In 1782, Banister was listed in Dinwiddie County records with three free males, 46 adult slaves, 42 slaves under age, 28 horses, 126 cattle, and one chariot.

== Revolutionary War ==
During the Revolutionary War, Banister was a lieutenant colonel of cavalry in the Virginia line militia. General and Commander-in-Chief George Washington regarded him highly, as witnessed by a letter he wrote to him from Valley Forge. In 1781, he aided in supplying his militia and in repelling the British from his state. Much of his personal property was lost. British forces under General William Phillips would commonly stop at his home in Battersea.

== Death ==
On September 30, 1788, John Banister died in Virginia. He was likely buried in his family plot at Hatcher's Run, his family plantation estate in Dinwiddie County, Virginia.

== Namesake ==
A distinguished Pennsylvania jurist, John Bannister Gibson (1780-1853), was named after John Banister, although using a slightly different spelling of the name.

== Sources ==
- Simmons, Davis (2025). The Proprietor of Battersea: The Life and Legacy of American Founder John Banister (1734–1788) (MA thesis). Virginia Commonwealth University. doi:10.25772/3J57-T312.
- "National Register of Historic Places, Registration form for Battersea" (PDF). 2006. Archived from the original (PDF) on 2007-11-13.
