= Joseph Jones (Virginia politician) =

American politician

Personal details
- Born: 1727 King George County, Virginia, British America
- Died: October 28, 1805 (aged 77-78) Fredericksburg, Virginia
- Spouse: Mary Taliaferro (m. 1758)
- Relations: James Monroe (nephew)

Joseph Jones (1727 – October 28, 1805) was an American lawyer and statesman from King George County, Virginia. He was an Anti-Federalist.

== Biography ==
Jones was born in King George County, Virginia, part of the Northern Neck, in 1727. Jones was born to James Jones and Hester Lampton Jones (Davis)., His father ran a country store and tavern and later became a successful merchant with many contacts to England. Jones was educated nearby but went to England to continue his education; he went to the Inner Temple in London in 1749 and the Middle Temple in 1751, becoming a barrister.

Jones then returned to Virginia and achieved success as a lawyer in the growing town of Fredericksburg. In 1754, Jones become King's attorney for Fredericksburg. In 1758, he married Mary Taliaferro, the daughter of Colonel John Taliaferro of Spotsylvania County.

In 1772, Jones became a member of the Virginia House of Burgesses, the colonial legislature. Jones was a "cautious patriot" and served on the committee of safety in 1774-75. In 1776, Jones was a supporter of the Revolution during Virginia's second state committee of safety. Also in 1776, Jones was elected to the Fifth Virginia Convention, which produced the Virginia Declaration of Rights.

Jones served as a Virginia delegate to the Second Continental Congress in 1777 and 1778. He was appointed to serve as judge of the Virginia General Court on January 23, 1778, and resigned in October 1779. Jones then returned to the Continental Congress, serving as a Virginia delegate from 1780 to 1783.

Jones was a close friend of Thomas Jefferson. Jones served in the House of Delegates in 1787, where he split with his longtime friend James Madison over the Constitution. Jones wrote in an October 29, 1787, letter to Madison that he had "many objections" to the Constitution and wished to see a declaration of rights attached to it.

Jones was a member of the 1788 Virginia Ratifying Convention, which ratified the federal Constitution. At the Convention, Jones was at first a supporter of the proposed constitution, but later turned against it, joining with Patrick Henry, George Mason, and others to draft proposed amendments to the Constitution. Jones subsequently became "embittered over what he believed was Madison's betrayal of the rights of Virginians" and voted against ratification.

Jones was then appointed once more as judge of the Virginia General Court, on November 19, 1789. Jones served as a major general of the Virginia militia.

During the presidency of George Washington, Jones was a supporter of the Jeffersonian faction. He died at his home in Fredericksburg on October 28, 1805. Jones was the uncle of James Monroe.

His "Letters" were published in 1889.
