= Lee House =

Lee House may refer to:

== United States ==
=== Alaska ===
- Jesse Lee Home for Children, Seward

=== Arkansas ===
- Carl and Esther Lee House, Damascus
- R.E. Lee House, Pine Bluff

=== Connecticut ===
- Thomas Lee House, East Lyme
- Daniel and Mary Lee House, Portland

=== Georgia ===
- Gordon-Lee House, Chickamauga
- Lee and Gordon Mill, Chickamauga
- Agnes Lee Chapter House of the United Daughters of the Confederacy, Decatur, listed on the NRHP in DeKalb County
- W. G. Lee Alumni House, Macon, listed on the NRHP in Bibb County

=== Idaho ===
- J.O. Lee House, Jerome, listed on the NRHP in Jerome County
- J.O. Lee Honey House, Jerome, listed on the NRHP in Jerome County

=== Iowa ===
- Lee House (Independence, Iowa)

=== Kentucky ===
- Addison W. Lee House, Louisville, listed on the NRHP in Jefferson County
- Lee House (Maysville, Kentucky)

=== Massachusetts ===
- Hooper-Lee Nichols House, Cambridge
- Jeremiah Lee House, Marblehead

=== Michigan ===
- John and Rosetta Lee House, Lapeer

=== Minnesota ===
- Olaf Lee House, St. Paul

=== Mississippi ===
- Lee House (Batesville, Mississippi)
- S. D. Lee House, Columbus
- Lee-Mitts House, Enterprise, listed on the NRHP in Clarke County
- Lee-Dubard House, Grenada, listed on the NRHP in Grenada County

=== Montana ===
- Lee Homestead, Decker, listed on the NRHP in Big Horn County
- Johnson-Lee House, Kalispell, listed on the NRHP in Flathead County

=== Nebraska ===
- George F. Lee Octagon Houses, Nebraska City

=== New Jersey ===
- Stokes–Lee House, Collingswood

=== North Carolina ===
- Gen. William C. Lee House, Dunn
- Lovett Lee House, Giddensville
- Harry Fitzhugh Lee House, Goldsboro
- Jones-Lee House, Greenville
- William H. Lee House, Lewiston
- Malcolm K. Lee House, Monroe
- James H. Lee House in the Monroe Residential Historic District (Monroe, North Carolina)
- Heck-Lee, Heck-Wynne, and Heck-Pool Houses, Raleigh

=== Ohio ===
- Samuel Lee House, Coshocton, listed on the NRHP in Coshocton County

=== Oklahoma ===
- Jeff Lee Park Bath House and Pool, McAlester, listed on the NRHP in Pittsburg County

=== Oregon ===
- Dr. Norman L. Lee House, Junction City, listed on the NRHP in Pittsburg County
- Jason Lee House, Salem

=== Tennessee ===
- Samuel B. Lee House, Duplex
- James Lee House (239 Adams Avenue, Memphis) in Tennessee
- James Lee House (690 Adams Avenue, Memphis), also known as the Harsson-Goyer-Lee House and operated as a business called "James Lee House"
- Lt. George W. Lee House, Memphis, listed on the NRHP in Shelby County
- Lt. George W. Lee House, Memphis, listed on the NRHP in Shelby County
- Lee and Fontaine Houses of the James Lee Memorial, Memphis

=== Texas ===
- Walter J. Lee House, Belton, listed on the NRHP in Bell County
- Link-Lee House, Houston

=== Utah ===
- John Ruphard Lee House, Beaver, listed on the NRHP in Beaver County
- John E. Lee House, Hyde Park
- Charles W. and Leah Lee House, Torrey

=== Vermont ===
- Lee Farm, Waterford

=== Virginia ===
- Arlington House, The Robert E. Lee Memorial, Arlington, also known as Custis-Lee Mansion
- Robert E. Lee Boyhood Home, Alexandria
- Lee-Fendall House, Alexandria
- Lee Hall Mansion, Newport News
- Stewart-Lee House, Richmond

=== West Virginia ===
- Mattie V. Lee Home, Charleston
- Lee-Longsworth House, Harpers Ferry
- Lee-Throckmorton-McDonald House, Inwood
- Lighthorse Harry Lee Cabin, Mathias

== See also ==
- James Lee House (disambiguation)
- Lee Hall (disambiguation)
- Fong Lee Company, Oroville, California, listed on the NRHP in Butte County
- Don Lee Building, San Francisco, California, listed on the NRHP in San Francisco
- Lee Hotel, Yuma, Arizona
- Robert E. Lee Hotel (disambiguation)
- Robert E. Lee Monument (disambiguation)
- Robert E. Lee School (disambiguation)
