= Richard Lee I =

English-born merchant, planter and politician (1618–1664)

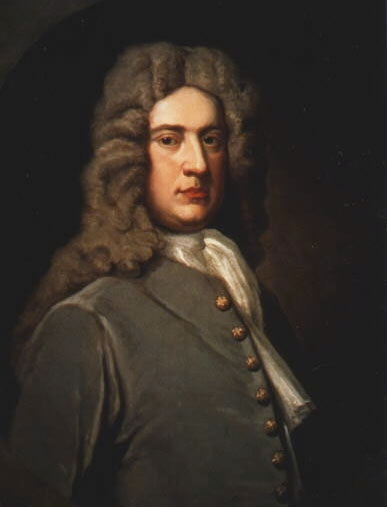

Member of the Virginia Governor's Council
- In office 1651, 1660-1664

Member of the House of Burgesses representing York County
- In office 1647–1648 Serving with Francis Morgan, William Taylor
- Preceded by: Hugh Gwin
- Succeeded by: Rowland Burnham

Attorney General for the Virginia colony
- In office 1643 – possibly 1651
- Preceded by: n/a
- Succeeded by: Peter Jenings

Personal details
- Born: 1618
- Died: 1 March 1664 (aged 45–46)
- Spouse: Anne Constable
- Children: 10 (including Richard Lee II and Hancock Lee)
- Parent(s): John Lee I Jane Hancock
- Relatives: Zachary Taylor (great-great-grandson); Robert E. Lee (great-great-great-grandson)
- Occupation: Lawyer, Planter, Soldier, Politician

Richard Lee I (c. 1618 – 1 March 1664) was an English-born merchant, planter and politician who was the first member of the Lee family to live in America. Poor when he arrived in the colony of Virginia in 1639, Lee may have been both the colony's wealthiest inhabitant and its largest landholder by the time of his death, owning 15,000 acres (23 sq mi) in Virginia and Maryland. In addition to holding several important government and military posts, he became a merchant, planter and politician and served a term in the House of Burgesses. He managed to negotiate several major political upheavals for his economic gain.

== Personal life ==
Lee was christened on 22 March 1618. He was the son of John Lee I (c. 1588–1630) and his wife Jane Hancock. He had at least two brothers, John Lee, who became a merchant in London, and Thomas Lee. According to family tradition, genteel ancestors owned Coton Hall in Shropshire, England but more recent genealogical research links both sides of the family to merchants in Worcester, about 20 miles (32 km) south of Coton Hall, and Worcestershire. Lee's father died in February 1630 and his mother remarried but died in 1639, leaving a will which favored her sons John and Thomas rather than Richard. John was apprenticed to a maternal kinsman who was a wine merchant in London, and Richard sailed to the Virginia colony when he was 21.

Lee married his wife Anne or Anna in a newly built brick church at Jamestown in late 1641 or early 1642, and outgoing Governor Francis Wyatt gave the bride away. They had 10 children before returning to England in 1663. However, Richard Lee returned a final time to Virginia, probably accompanied by a son, and his final will required his widow and most of his sons to return to the colony. Though generations of Lees did not know her original surname, she now appears to possibly have been a daughter of London publisher Francis Constable, baptized in 1622, and a ward of Sir John Thorowgood, a personal attendant upon King Charles I.

== Career ==
According to family tradition Richard Lee arrived at Jamestown, Virginia, in 1639 with little wealth, but on the same ship as Virginia's incoming royal governor, Sir Francis Wyatt (who had been the colony's first governor two decades earlier). Wyatt would become an important mentor before receiving an order recalling him to England in late 1641 (and departing the following spring). Another passenger on that ship was Anne Constable. Lee began his career as a government official handling land records (among other duties), and would hold several important colony-wide as well as local offices, as discussed below.

Early in his American career, in addition to his offices discussed below, Lee traded with his brother John in England as well as Native Americans, including for furs. His first land patent (in which he designated himself as a "gentleman") was for land on the north side of the York River at the head of Poropotank Creek, in what was then York, later Gloucester County. Lee received the title to this 1,000 acre (4 km^{2}) tract on 10 August 1642, supposedly through the headrights of thirty-eight immigrants unable to pay their own passage. However, Lee did not take title to this land until 1646, and a record exists of his purchasing 100 acres (0.4 km^{2}) at this location. Also, Lee may have actually transported those emigrants in his own ship when returning from Breda in the Netherlands in 1650. In any event, the Lee family's first home was likely a log cabin on leased land on the same side of the York river, at the head of Tindall's Creek near the Native American community of Capahosic Wicomico. Lee moved his bride and infant son John away from the capital city (notoriously unhealthy due to stagnant waters nearby in summers), and they lived near the frontier of settlement. However, on 18 April 1644, Powhatan warriors led by Chief Opchanacanough massacred many newcomers to the area and their native allies. They killed 300, but colonists successfully counterattacked and drove the raiders away. Nonetheless, the English abandoned the north side of the York river for several years.

Lee and his family escaped the 1644 raid, then settled at New Poquoson on the lower peninsula south of the York River, where it was safer from attack. They lived at the new 90 acres (360,000 m^{2}) plantation for nine years, which was a comfortable ride from Jamestown and Lee's government duties. Later, as discussed below, Lee moved his family further north in Virginia's Tidewater region, becoming among the first white settlers in what became known as the northern neck of Virginia between the Rappahannock and Potomac Rivers.

Meanwhile, on 20 August 1646 Lee took out a patent for 1,250 acres (5 km^{2}) on the Pamunkey River in York, later New Kent County, at the spot "where the foot Company met with the Boats when they went Pamunkey March under ye command of Capt. William Claiborne" during the counteroffensive against the Indians after the massacre of 1644. He did not develop these lands, but exchanged them in 1648 for a tract along the north side of the York near the present Capahosic, retaining the 400 acres (1.6 km^{2}) he called "War Captain's Neck" and selling the other 850 acres (3.4 km^{2}).

=== Colonial politician and officeholder ===
Lee's first Virginia office was as Clerk of the Quarter Court at Jamestown, within the Secretary of State's office. He later became Clerk to the burgesses of the Virginia General Assembly in 1640 and 1641. In 1643 the new governor, Sir William Berkeley, on the recommendation of his predecessor Sir Francis Wyatt, appointed Lee as Attorney General of the Colony, and he also continued as clerk. Like both his superiors, Lee was a loyal supporter of King Charles I of England, and his public offices technically ceased after Oliver Cromwell seized power in England in 1649 (although Lee would ultimately negotiate terms of accommodation with the new government before temporarily ending his public career in 1652).

Fellow colonists in York County elected Lee a Burgess in the Assembly of 1647–1648. In 1649 Lee was appointed a member of the King's Council (both a primitive executive branch of government and the precursor of the upper house of Virginia's legislature). As Secretary of State, Lee was next in authority to the Governor, Sir William Berkeley (1606–1677). That same year, Charles I, King of England (1600–1649), was beheaded and Oliver Cromwell (1599–1658) began his control. In part because people in the distant colonies could not believe the news from England, they remained loyal to the Crown and to Charles II (1630–1685), heir to the throne. In 1650, Secretary of State Lee sailed to the Netherlands to report Virginia's loyal adherence to the exiled Charles II, and returned with a new (but worthless) commission from the late King's heir for Governor Berkeley. During the next two years (and Berkeley's forced retirement), Lee negotiated the Virginia colony's capitulation to the Commonwealth of England, and was satisfied with the terms that were laid out.

Lee then retired from public office, but continued to represent the Virginia interests in London. Between 1652 and his death in 1664, Lee spent nearly as much time in London (36 months), as he did in Virginia (46 months), though he continued to hold local Virginia offices. When Charles II took the throne in 1660, Berkeley was restored as governor, and Lee continued to serve on the Council of State.

Meanwhile, Lee served a time as High Sheriff as well as held various offices in the local counties where he lived, as discussed below, including as a Justice of the York County Court, and as a colonel in the Northumberland County Militia.

=== Merchant and planter ===
Lee would come to characterize himself as a merchant, but early in his career he became a real estate investor, and after Cromwell came to power, became a tobacco planter. He became a part owner of a trading ship, whose cargoes brought indentured servants with headrights that Lee used to enlarge his Virginia property. Lee also became involved in the slave trade as his landholdings grew, and he needed labor to operate plantations. He both employed and imported both English indentured servants (i.e. employees who paid for their passage to America with seven years of labor) and at least 90 African slaves (for which he claimed 4000 acres of headrights in 1660).

After returning from his Continental voyage on Gov. Berkeley's behalf in 1650, Lee began acquiring many land grants on the Middle Peninsula between the York and the Rappahannock River, although the colonial capital would not move to the "Middle Plantation" and later to Williamsburg until after his death. After peace with the Indians had been concluded and the lands north of the York reopened for settlement in 1649, Lee acquired a patent for 500 acres (2 km^{2}) on 24 May 1651, on land adjacent to "War Captain's Neck". That same year he also acquired an additional 500 acres (2 km^{2}) on Poropotank Creek. He sold 150 acres (0.6 km^{2}) of his original grant, the tract on Poropotank Creek. This left 850 acres (3.4 km^{2}) at the original site, to which he later gave the name "Paradise", and resided from 1653 to 1656 in the newly created Gloucester County.

After a trip back to London with his wife in 1654-1655 (leaving their children in Virginia), in 1656 Lee moved his family to Virginia's Northern Neck, the peninsula formed between the Rappahannock and Potomac Rivers. Leaving the "Paradise" tract to overseers, they resettled on a spot acquired from the Wicomico Indians, which consisted of 1,900 acres (8 km^{2}). In 1648 the Virginia General Assembly had created Northumberland County in this area, and in 1653 separated Westmoreland County from Northumberland County. The new plantation was called "Dividing Creek", near what is today the town of Kilmarnock in Northumberland County. Later generations of Lees came to call parts of this plantation "Cobbs Hall" and "Ditchley". Lee later purchased another 2,600 acres (11 km^{2}) at Machodoc Creek, which also seemed a possible port along the Potomac River where ships could traffic with England, and which became part of Westmoreland County. This tract was patented on 18 October 1657, and re-patented the following year on 5 June 1658 as 2,000 acres (8 km^{2}). Later generations of Lees developed this area into the "Mount Pleasant" and "Lee Hall" plantations. Lee also acquired 4,000 acres (16 km^{2}) farther up the Potomac, near and westward of where the city of Washington, D.C., would rise, in what became Westmoreland County (but after various subdivisions became part of modern Fairfax and Alexandria). Part of one tract would eventually become Mount Vernon plantation, and later generations of Lees would develop "Leesylvania" and "Stratford" plantations.

Disposing of several lesser properties he had obtained, Lee consolidated and developed four major plantations. He had two in Gloucester County: "War Captain's Neck" and "Paradise", and two on the Northern Neck: "Dividing Creek" in Northumberland County and "Machodoc" in Westmoreland County. At the end of his life, Lee also acquired a plantation called "Lee's Purchase", located across the Potomac in Maryland, which after its reacquisition by the Lee family would give rise to the "Blenheim" branch of Lee descendants.

During a trip to England in 1658 with his eldest son John, Lee acquired a residence at Stratford Langthorne, in the County of Essex, then a pleasant suburb of London. In 1661 he moved his wife and children there, although the steward he had found to manage his Virginia property (and to whom he had promised to marry one of his daughters) had grown homesick and returned with them. Essex County borders London on the east, and persons of means developed the village of Stratford Langthorne to avoid unhealthy London. It is located about a mile from Stratford-at-Bow on the north side of the Thames in West Ham Parish, and later became the site of great wharves, docks, and the congestion of east London. Lee in part returned to England so that his younger children would have a proper education, since his oldest two sons, John and the scholarly Richard Lee II, had enrolled as students at Oxford. Nevertheless, in his final days, described below, Lee decided he wanted his children to reside in Virginia, and continued in his role as a Virginia planter and merchant.

== Death and legacy ==
Just before returning to Virginia to oversee his interests in the Colony, Lee executed a will in London (on 6 February 1663–4). Lee died on 1 March 1664, in the Virginia colony, probably after an illness at his "Dividing Creek" plantation based on gaps in his service in the Northumberland County court. On 20 April 1664 his son John (who had probably returned to Virginia with his father) made an application for land due to his father, "deceased".

Lee's final will directed that his wife and children, "all except Francis if he be pleased", were to return to Virginia. Francis Lee had become a London merchant. His property at Stratford in England was to be sold, and the proceeds be used to discharge his debts, as well as pay for the education of his two eldest sons (John and Richard), and if any remained, to provide dowries for his daughters (Elizabeth and Anne). Lee left the rest of his land to his widow Anne for her lifetime, then to be divided among all his sons as instructed. Following Anne's death, the "Dividing Creek" and "Mocke Nock" plantations were to be divided among his three youngest sons; his son John would inherit the "Machodoc" plantation and three islands in Chesapeake Bay; Richard Lee II received the "Paradise" plantation; Francis Lee received "Paper-makers Neck" and "War Captain's Neck"; William Lee received "all the land on the Maryland side", and his two youngest sons (Hancock and Charles) received the remaining plantations and land. Lee specifically left his widow 5 "negro" slaves for "during her widowhood and no longer" as well as 10 English (indentured) servants. He gave John 10 "negro" slaves as well as 10 English (indentured) servants. He left Richard II the indentures (contracts) of English servants (i.e. employees) on the "Paradise" plantation, and Francis received five "negro" slaves and the indentures of 10 English servants. Other property that was divided among his 8 surviving children included livestock and furniture. Francis also received Lee's share in 2 trading ships Francis.

His widow Anna (or Anne) obeyed his wishes and returned to Virginia. She remarried, to Edmund Lister, also a Northumberland County colonist with extensive English ties, who would sue his stepson John Lee (also executor of his father's estate; the documents being lost) before his death on 24 September 1666. The date of her death is unknown, although family tradition claims that she was buried beside Lee near the house at "Dividing Creek".

== Children ==
Richard Lee I and his wife Ann had ten children:

1. John Lee (1643–1673) of "Mount Pleasant", who became a Burgess and High Sheriff, as well as served as his father's executor until his death, but never married
2. Col. Richard Lee II of "Paradise", "the Scholar" (1647–1715), who became his father's executor as well as inherited the Machodoc plantation that his brother John had inherited, upon John's death, and who married Laetitia Corbin (c.1657–1706), daughter of Hon. Henry Corbin, Sr. (1629–1676) and Alice (Eltonhead) Burnham (c.1627–1684). Great-Great-grandfather of General Robert E. Lee
3. Francis Lee (1648–1714), who remained in England as a merchant until 1670, then sold his inheritance, except for two trading ships and returned to England in 1677 where he remained and prospered; he married Tamar
4. Henry Lee (1650–1696) The Society of the Lees of Virginia do not recognize this son.
5. Capt. William Lee (1651–1696), who is not known to have ever married or to have fathered any children, but who bequeathed considerable acreage to widow Mary Heath, who married Batholomew Schreever which caused considerable litigation before its return to the Lee family
6. Capt. Hancock Lee, Hon. (1653–1709) of "Ditchley", who married 1) Mary Kendall (1661–1694); 2) Sarah Allerton (1671–1731), daughter of Col. Isaac Allerton, Jr. (1630–1702) (son of Isaac Allerton of the Mayflower and grandson of William Brewster of the Mayflower) and his second wife, Elizabeth (Willoughby). Great-grandfather of President Zachary Taylor
7. Elizabeth (Betsey) Lee (1654–1714), who married 1) Leonard Howson Sr (1648–1704); 2) John Turberville (1650–1728), son of George Turberville IV (1638-c.1659) and Bridget
8. Anne Lee (1654–1701), who married Maj. Thomas Youell Jr (1644–1695), son of Thomas Youell (1615–1655) and Anne Sturman (d. 1672)
9. Capt. Charles Lee Sr (1655–1701) who inherited the middle third of the Dividing Creek property and erected "Cobbs Hall" (though the structure was replaced in 1720 and 1853); he married Elizabeth Medstand daughter of Thomas Medstand (−1675).
10. Anne Lee (1655), who died young

Today the Lee family identifies different branches as: "Cobb's Hall", "Mount Pleasant", "Ditchley", "Lee Hall", "Blenheim", "Leesylvania", "Dividing Creek", and "Stratford". These were the estate names of the descendants of Richard Lee I that are still referred to today when talking of Lee descendancy. An interesting note is that Lee had patented somewhere in the neighbourhood of 15,000 acres (61 km^{2}) on both sides of the Potomac, in Maryland and in Virginia.

== See also ==
- McGaughy, J.K., Richard Henry Lee of Virginia: a portrait of an American revolutionary Chapter 1 Richard Henry Lee of Virginia: A Portrait of an American Revolutionary
- Lee, Casenove, Lee Chronicle, published by New York University Press, New York, NY, in 1957.
