= James Lee House =

James Lee House may refer to:

- James Lee House (239 Adams Avenue, Memphis), Tennessee, listed on the National Register of Historic Places (NRHP) in Shelby County
- James Lee House (690 Adams Avenue, Memphis), Tennessee, also known as the Harsson-Goyer-Lee House and operated as a business called "James Lee House," also listed on the NRHP
- James H. Lee House in the Monroe Residential Historic District (Monroe, North Carolina)

== See also ==
- Lee House (disambiguation)
- James Lee (disambiguation)
- James House (disambiguation)
