= James House =

James House may refer to:

- James House (singer) (born 1955), American country music artist
  - James House (1989 album)
- James House (Rogers, Arkansas), a historic house
- James House (Pensacola, Florida), a historic house
- James House (Hampton, New Hampshire), one of the oldest buildings in New Hampshire

== See also ==
- Randolph James House, El Dorado, Arkansas
- Dr. James House, Searcy, Arkansas
- C. N. James Cabin, Augusta, Kansas
- D. L. James House, Carmel Highlands, California
- T. L. James House, Ruston, Louisiana
- Capt. Benjamin James House, Scituate, Massachusetts
- Joseph K. James House, Somerville, Massachusetts
- Jesse James House, St. Joseph, Missouri
- Benjamin James House, Hampton, New Hampshire
- Charles Worth James House, Logan, Ohio, listed on the NRHP in Hocking County
- W. Leland James House, Portland, Oregon, listed on the NRHP in Multnomah County
- Morgan James Homestead, New Britain, Pennsylvania
- William Apollos James House, Bishopville, South Carolina
- Louie James House, Greer, South Carolina
- James House (Belton, Texas), listed on the NRHP in Bell County
- John P. and Sarah James House, Paradise, Utah, listed on the NRHP in Cache County
- Francis Wilcox James House, Port Townsend, Washington, listed on the NRHP in Jefferson County
- Samuel D. James House, Waukesha, Wisconsin, listed on the NRHP in Waukesha County
