= Longsworth =

Longsworth may refer to:

- Charles Longsworth (born 1929), an American company director
- Lewis G. Longsworth (1904–1981), an American chemist and biochemist
- Lee-Longsworth House, a house in Bolivar, West Virginia
