= John Lee (Virginia politician) =

American planter

Member of the Virginia House of Burgesses representing Westmoreland County
- In office 1673–1673 Serving with Valentine Peyton
- Preceded by: Richard Lee II
- Succeeded by: John Appleton

Personal details
- Born: 1643 York County, Virginia
- Died: 1673 (aged 29–30) Westmoreland County, Colony of Virginia
- Relations: Richard Lee II, Hancock Lee (brothers)
- Parent(s): Richard Lee I and Anne Constable
- Education: Oxford University
- Occupation: planter, soldier, legislator, justice of the peace

John Lee (1643 – 1673) was the eldest son of Lee family progenitor Richard Lee I.

Educated at the University of Oxford, he accompanied his father on several voyages between London and the Virginia colony, becoming a planter and official in Westmoreland County. He served a term in the House of Burgesses shortly before his death.

== Early and family life ==
Lee Family Coat of Arms

Named after his paternal grandfather or uncle, John Lee was born near Tindall's Creek on the north side of the York River shortly after his newly married parents moved away from the Virginia colony's capital at Jamestown, and as an infant escaped with them from a major Native American raid in 1644 that killed many English settlers and their native allies. He grew up at his father's various newly established plantations in Virginia, then sailed to England to study at Oxford University in preparation to becoming a physician.

== Career ==
However, after graduation he did not become a doctor, but instead assisted his father with the family's business interests, both mercantile and agricultural. John Lee probably accompanied his father on his last voyage to Virginia, where Richard Lee died on his Northumberland County plantation, after naming John Lee as his executor.

John Lee inherited three islands in Chesapeake Bay from his father, as well as the Machodoc plantation in Westmoreland County. In addition to operating the plantation (using his own, indentured and enslaved labor), Lee became an important person in Westmoreland County. He led its militia, including representing it on a joint committee with neighboring Northumberland and Stafford Counties to defend against Native American raids in 1666, and in 1673 he, Col. John Washington and others served on a commission to arrange the boundary line between Lancaster and Northumberland Counties. Lee also served as Westmoreland County's high sheriff at various times, as well as justice of the county court. Westmoreland County voters elected John Lee as one of the county's two delegates to the House of Burgesses in 1673, and he succeeded his younger brother Richard Lee II (who had served as one of the county's two delegates to the House of Burgesses in 1671 and 1672).

== Death and legacy ==
John Lee never married, and died at his home later that year. Although Richard Lee II had only inherited property in Gloucester County from his father, after his brother John's death, he not only inherited his brother's significant library, but also assumed responsibility as their father's executor, as well as inherited the Machodoc plantation (to which he moved his family). Machodoc would burn down in 1729, but a historical marker notes its continued use as the Lee family cemetery.
