= Ditchley (Kilmarnock, Virginia) =

Historic house in Virginia, United States

- U.S. National Register of Historic Places
- Virginia Landmarks Register
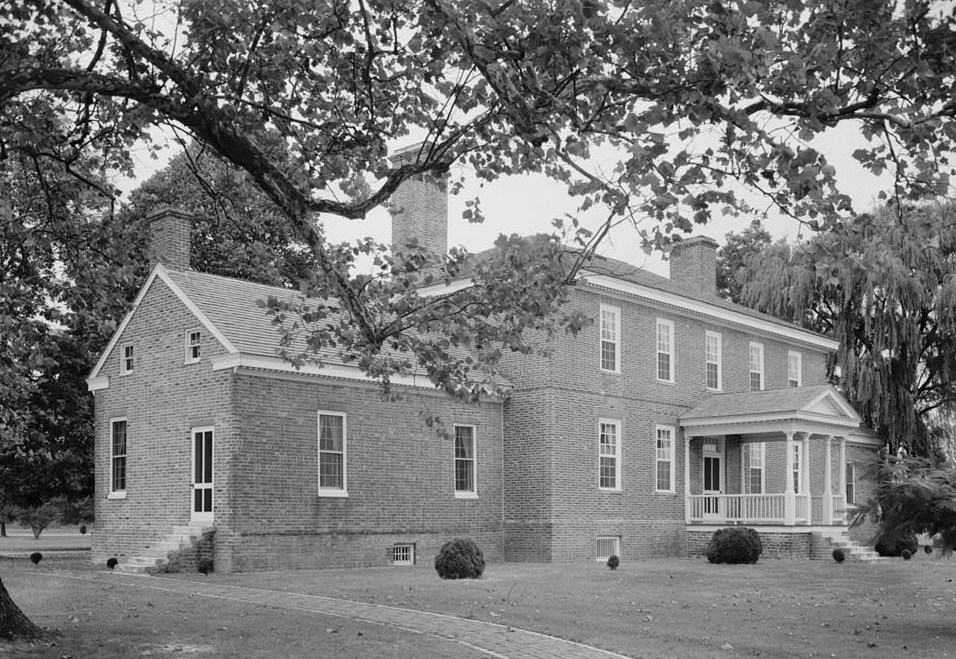
- Ditchley, HABS Photo

- Location within Virginia Location within the United States
- Location: 1571 Ditchley Road, Kilmarnock, VA 22482
- Coordinates: 37°44′01″N 76°20′11″W
- Area: 156 acres (63 ha)
- Built: 1762
- Architectural style: Georgian
- NRHP reference No.: 92001272
- VLR No.: 066-0004

Significant dates
- Added to NRHP: September 24, 1992
- Designated VLR: April 22, 1992

Ditchley is a historic plantation house located near Kilmarnock, Northumberland County, Virginia. It was built in 1762, and is a two-story, Georgian style brick mansion with a hipped roof. It consists of a five bay main block flanked by one-story wings. The house was renovated and modernized in the 1930s by noted philanthropist Jessie Ball duPont (1884-1970). Also on the property are two contributing smokehouses and the Lee family cemetery and site of a kitchen building.

Original built in 1687. This plantation was a grant to Col. Richard Lee I, progenitor of the Lee Family of Virginia, and was named for a Lee estate near Oxford, England. House was built by Kendall Lee, grandson of Richard Lee and son of Captain Hancock Lee, Hon. (1653–1709) and Mary Kendall (1661–1694).

It was listed on the National Register of Historic Places in 1992.
