= Lee Hall =

Lee Hall may refer to:

== People ==
- Lee Hall (artist) (1934–2017), American abstract painter, writer, educator, and former university president
- Lee Hall (playwright) (born 1966), English playwright and screenwriter
- Jesse Lee Hall (1849–1911), American Western lawman
- Lee Hall (died 1955), pilot of United Airlines Flight 629, destroyed by a bomb in 1955

== Places ==
- Lee Hall, Virginia, a community within Newport News, Virginia
  - Lee Hall Mansion, the historic NRHP-listed house for which the community is named
  - Lee Hall Depot, the historic NRHP-listed train station that served the community from the late 19th to the late 20th century
- Lee Hall (Virginia Tech), a residence Hall on the campus of Virginia Tech
- Leigh Hall (Gainesville, Florida)
- Lee Hall, a building at Wolfson College, Cambridge, England
