= Cobbs Hall =

Historic house in Virginia, United States

- U.S. National Register of Historic Places
- Virginia Landmarks Register
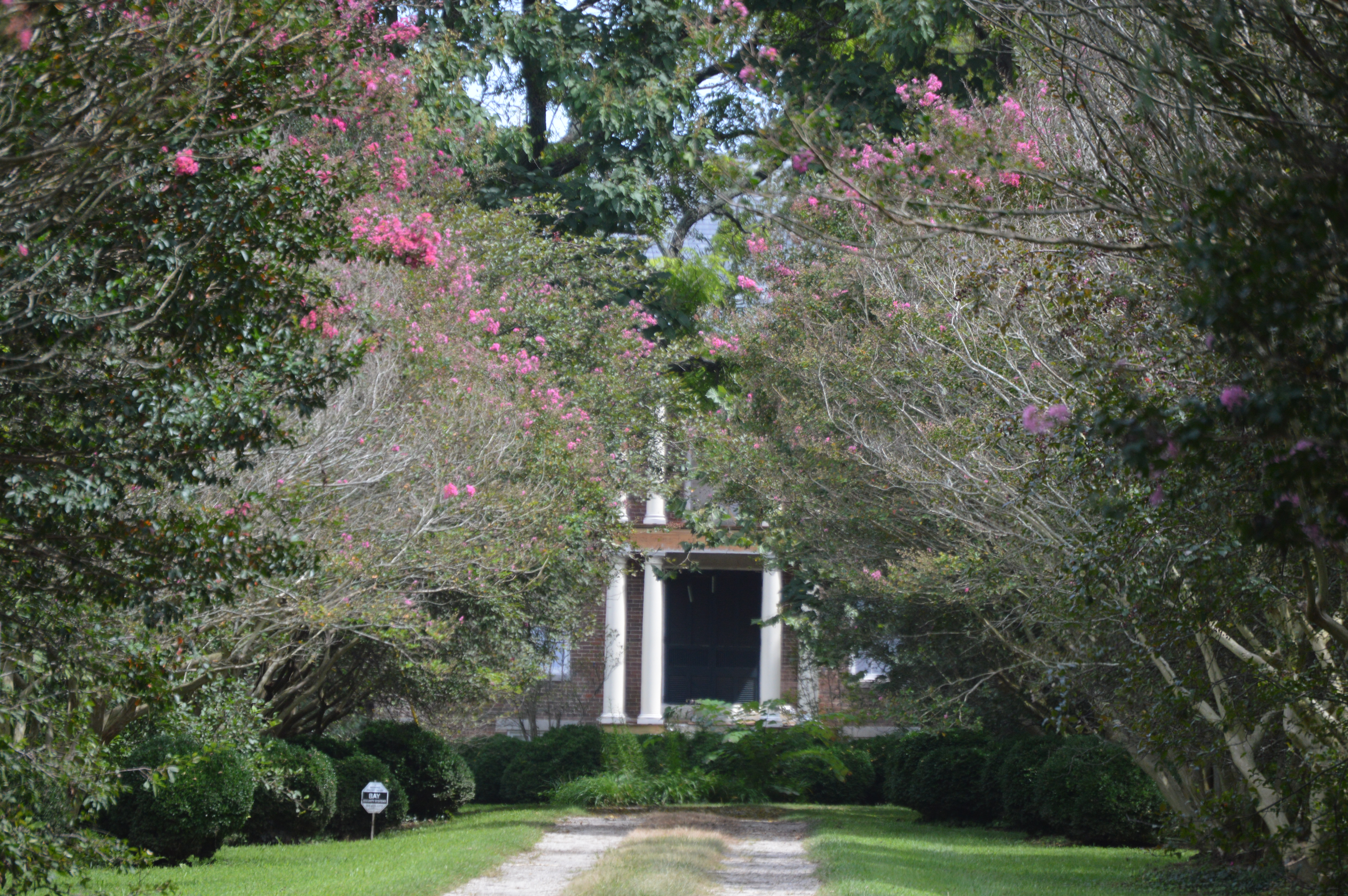
- Facade from the end of the lane

- Location within Virginia Location within the United States
- Location: 582 Cobbs Hall Ln., Kilmarnock, Virginia
- Coordinates: 37°44′38″N 76°20′23″W
- Area: 6.9 acres (2.8 ha)
- Built: 1853
- Built by: Mrs. Martha Lee Harvey
- Architectural style: Mid 19th Century Revival
- NRHP reference No.: 01000699
- VLR No.: 066-0003

Significant dates
- Added to NRHP: July 5, 2001
- Designated VLR: March 14, 2001

Cobbs Hall is a historic plantation house located at Kilmarnock, Northumberland County, Virginia. It was built in 1853, on the foundations of an earlier dwelling of the same design. It is a two-story, five-bay, double pile brick dwelling with a gable roof. The front and rear facades feature similar porches supported by Tuscan order columns. The ends have two semi-exterior end chimneys flanking the peak of the gable. Also on the property are the contributing Cobbs Hall graveyard containing Lee family remains, the remains of a 1 1/2-story brick dwelling, and a brick meat house. Cobbs Hall is one of the noted Northern Neck plantations associated with the Lee family of Virginia since the middle of the 17th century.

It was listed on the National Register of Historic Places in 2001.
