= Capt. Benjamin James House =

Historic house in Massachusetts, United States

- U.S. National Register of Historic Places
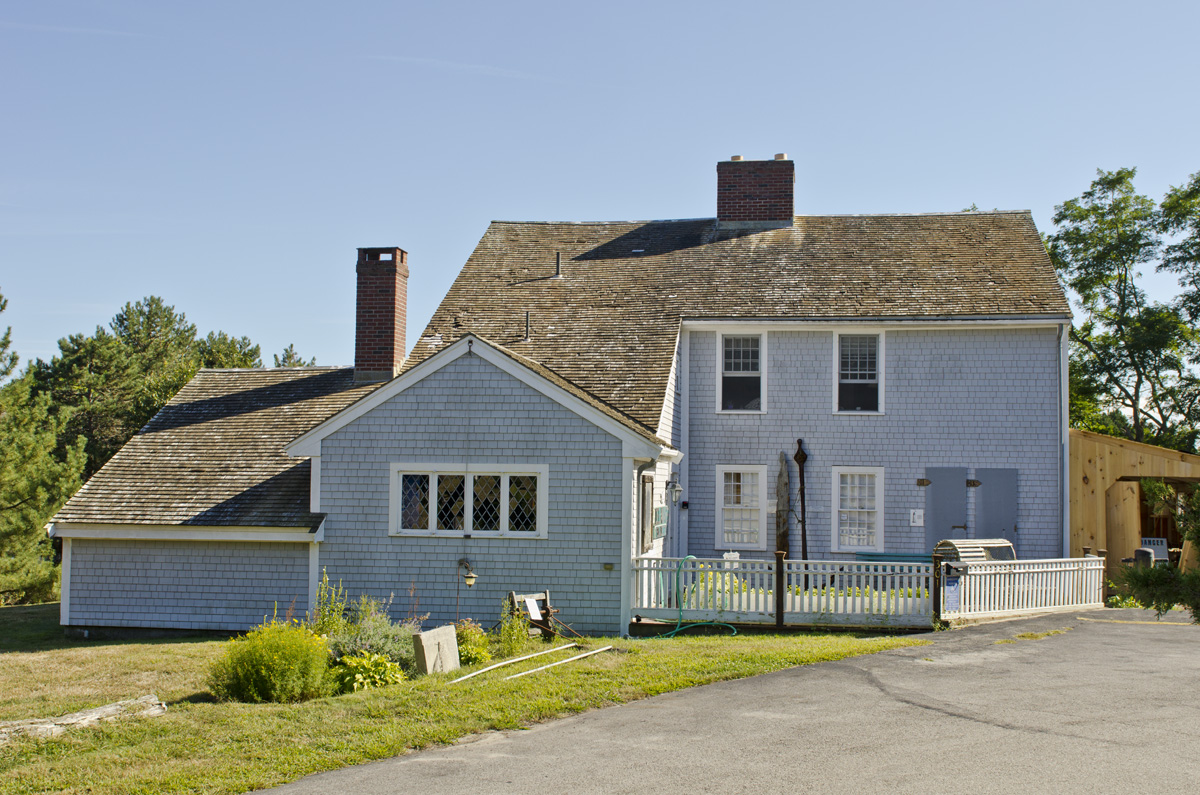

- Location within Massachusetts Location within the United States
- Location: Scituate, Massachusetts
- Coordinates: 42°10′37″N 70°44′35″W
- Built: 1700
- NRHP reference No.: 83004095
- Added to NRHP: November 29, 1983

The Capt. Benjamin James House is a historic First Period house, now a museum, at 301 Driftway in Scituate, Massachusetts. The oldest part of this 2 1/2-story timber-frame house was built c. 1700 by Captain Benjamin James. During the 18th century it was enlarged to its present five-bay saltbox configuration. After James' death in 1788, the house was used by the town as a "pest house", isolating smallpox victims there.

The house is now home of the Maritime and Irish Mossing Museum, owned and maintained by the Scituate Historical Society. There are exhibits of the mossing industry, ship building on the North River, shipwrecks, life saving. It is open Sunday afternoons, 1–4 p.m. Sept through June. Sat and Sun, July and August.

The house was listed on the National Register of Historic Places in 1983.

== See also ==
- National Register of Historic Places listings in Plymouth County, Massachusetts
