= Mattie V. Lee Home =

Historic house in West Virginia, United States

- U.S. National Register of Historic Places
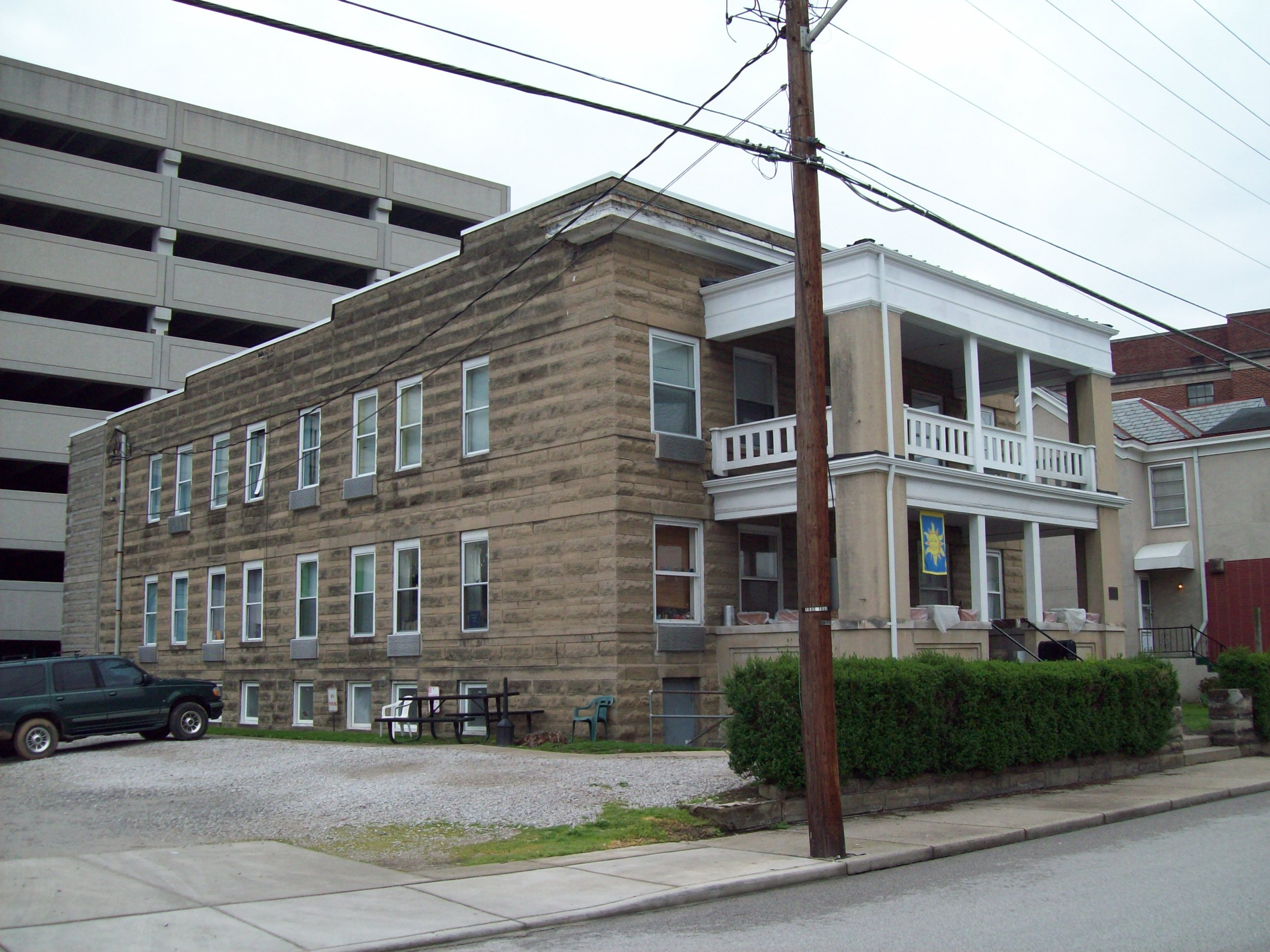
- Mattie V. Lee Home, April 2009

- Location within West Virginia Location within the United States
- Location: 810 Donnally St., Charleston, West Virginia
- Coordinates: 38°21′6″N 81°37′51″W
- Built: 1920
- Architectural style: Classical Revival
- NRHP reference No.: 92000303
- Added to NRHP: June 16, 1992

Mattie V. Lee Home is a historic home located at Charleston, West Virginia. It stands on what was once a densely packed commercial block close to the center of a historically African-American neighborhood in Charleston. It was built about 1920 and is a two-story concrete block structure with a prominent raised basement and features a two-tier front porch.

It was listed on the National Register of Historic Places in 1992.
