= Lee–Throckmorton–McDonald House =

Historic house in West Virginia, United States

- U.S. National Register of Historic Places
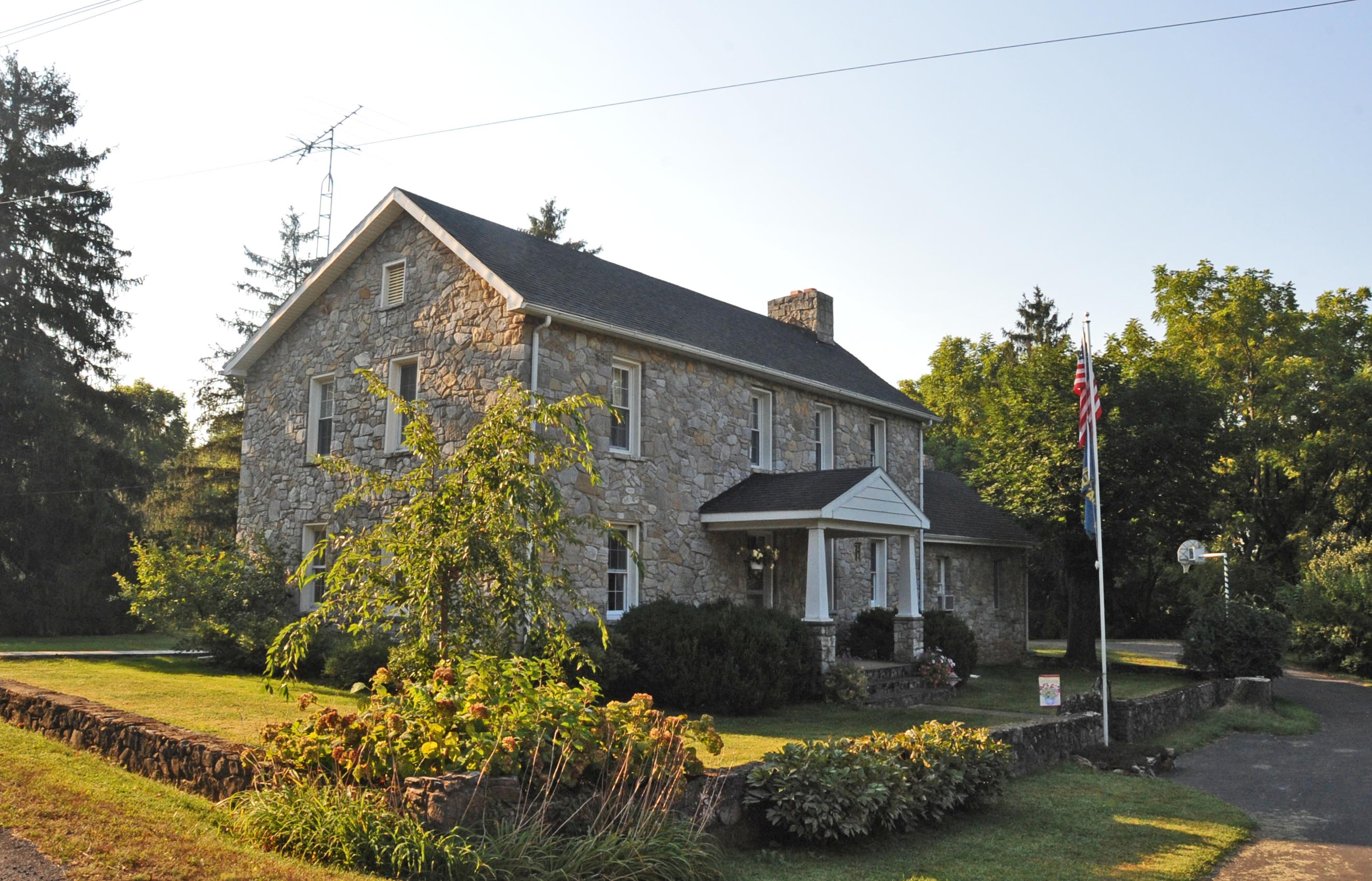

- Location within West Virginia Location within the United States
- Location: 2101 Arden-Nolville Rd., near Inwood, West Virginia
- Coordinates: 39°23′19″N 78°2′46″W
- Area: 5.4 acres (2.2 ha)
- Built: 1810, 1880, 1939
- NRHP reference No.: 04000312
- Added to NRHP: April 14, 2004

Lee–Throckmorton–McDonald House, also known as "Rural Hill," is a historic home located near Inwood, Berkeley County, West Virginia. It was originally built in 1810 as a log home and substantially enlarged in 1880. It was enlarged again in 1939 and sheathed in a limestone veneer. The front entrance features a pedimented portico. A rear kitchen wing was added in 1981. It was originally built as the miller's house for a grist mill that is no longer extant.

It was listed on the National Register of Historic Places in 2004.
