= Robert E. Lee School =

Robert E. Lee School may refer to:

- Robert E. Lee School (Little Rock, Arkansas), listed on the National Register of Historic Places (NRHP) in Little Rock
- Robert E. Lee School (Durant, Oklahoma), NRHP-listed in Bryan County
- Robert E. Lee School (Paris, Tennessee), NRHP-listed in Henry County
