= George F. Lee Octagon Houses =

Historic houses in Nebraska, United States

- U.S. National Register of Historic Places
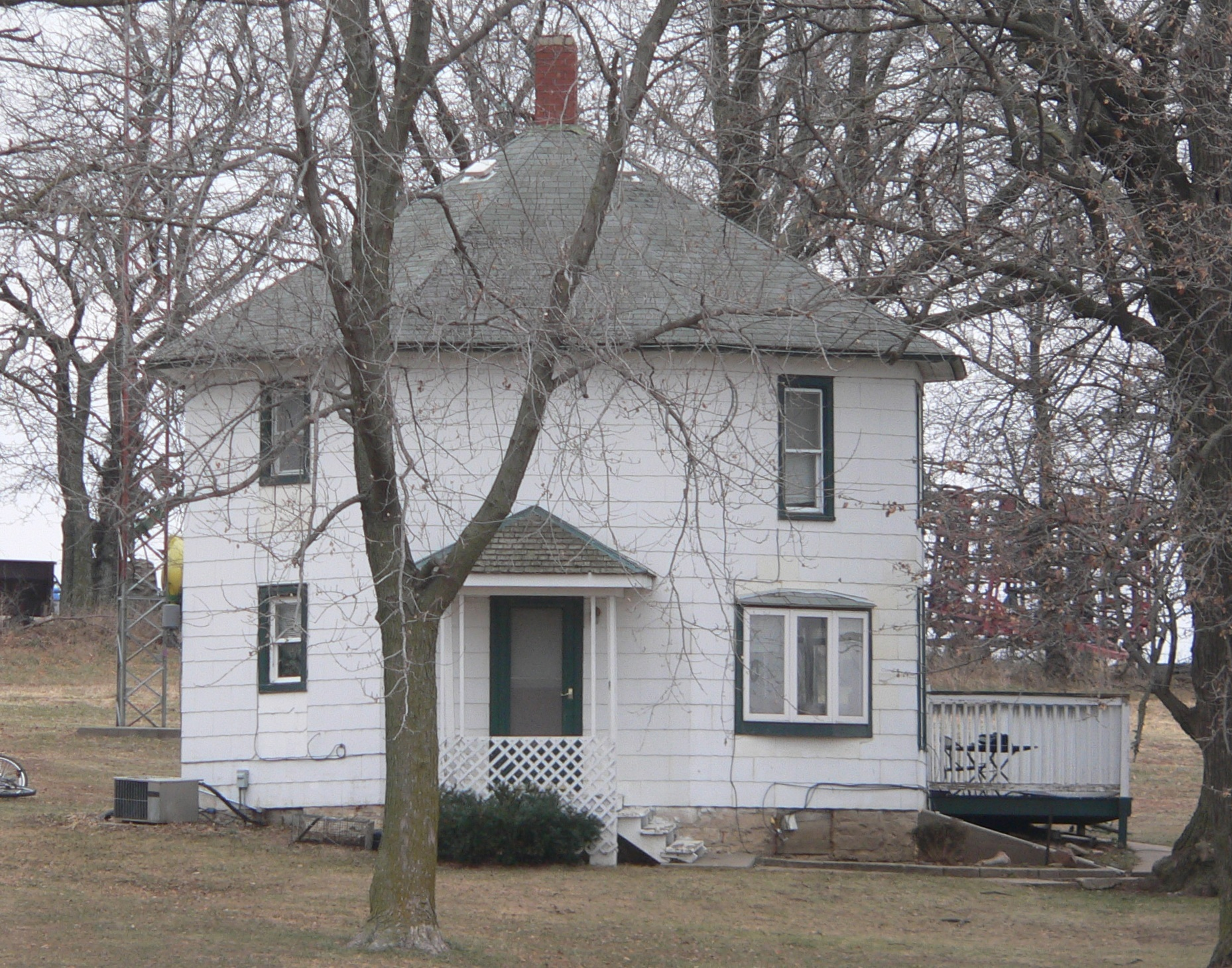
- Frame octagon house

- Location within Nebraska Location within the United States
- Nearest city: Nebraska City, Nebraska
- Coordinates: 40°34′18.03″N 95°48′5.39″W
- Built: Date unknown; 1872
- Architect: Lee, George F.
- NRHP reference No.: 77000834
- Added to NRHP: November 23, 1977

The George F. Lee Octagon Houses were built by farmer and carpenter George F. Lee south of Nebraska City, Nebraska near the Missouri River. The first one constructed was a frame octagon house, whose date of construction is unknown; the second, a brick octagon house, was built in 1872 across the road from the first.

On November 23, 1977, they were added to the National Register of Historic Places. Only the wooden house survives.

Lee was a congregationalist and instrumental in the formation of Doane University. He gave part of his estate to Doane, and the University named the chapel of "The Con" after him. The historic pentagon shaped building has Lee Memorial Chapel above the west entrance and Whitcomb Conservatory of Music on the east entrance.
