= Lee House (Maysville, Kentucky) =

Historic house in Kentucky, United States

- U.S. National Register of Historic Places
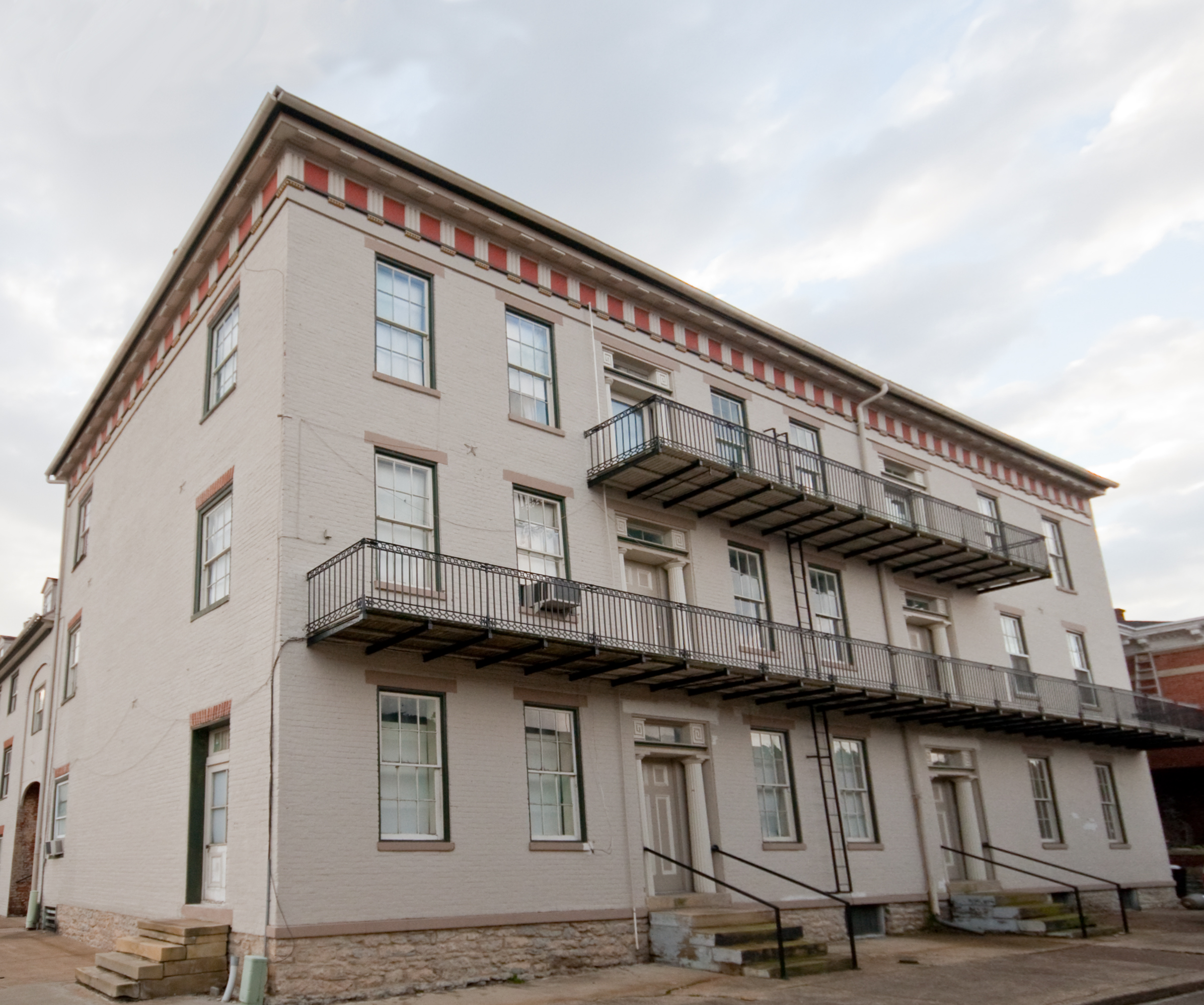

- Location within Kentucky Location within the United States
- Location: Front and Sutton Sts., Maysville, Kentucky
- Coordinates: 38°38′56″N 83°45′59″W
- Built: 1790, 1844, 1850
- Architectural style: Greek Revival
- Website: leehouseinn.com
- NRHP reference No.: 77000634
- Added to NRHP: December 20, 1977

The Lee House facing front street was built as a hotel by Peter Lee in 1844. It was considered one of the finest inns of the day and hosted a number of prominent guests including Henry Clay and Governor John Chambers. The inn became a popular stop on the way for summer tourists destined for the Blue Licks Spring. A number of parties and masked balls were held in its generous rooms.

The complex consists of an original structure facing Sutton Street (circa 1790), the building facing Front Street (1844) and a three-story addition of 16 hotel rooms (circa 1850). Most of the design elements are Greek Revival and the brickwork is Flemish bond. Construction of the floodwall in the early 1950s protected the structure from flooding, but blocked the river view from the lower two stories.

The structure was bought in 1863 by Charles B. Hill and was known for some time as the Hill House. In 1977, it was listed on the National Register of Historic Places.
