= James House (Pensacola, Florida) =

Historic house in Florida, United States

- U.S. National Register of Historic Places
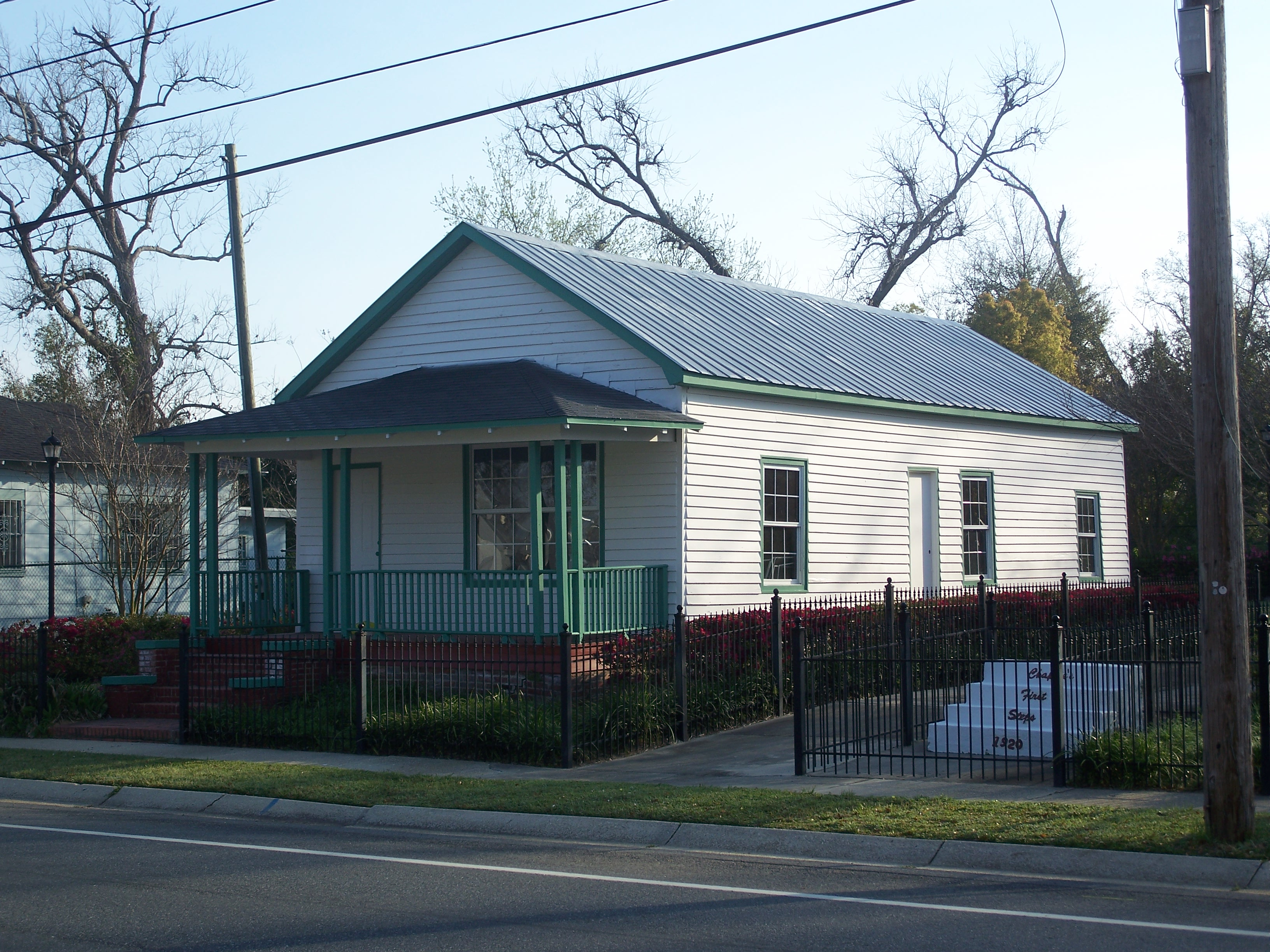

- Location within Florida Location within the United States
- Location: Pensacola, Florida
- Coordinates: 30°25′55″N 87°12′49″W
- Area: less than one acre
- NRHP reference No.: 00001501
- Added to NRHP: December 13, 2000

The James House, also known as the "Chappie" James House, was the home of Daniel "Chappie" James, Jr. in Pensacola, Florida. It is located at 1606 North Martin Luther King Boulevard. On December 13, 2000, it was added to the U.S. National Register of Historic Places.
