= Robert E. Lee Monument =

Robert E. Lee Monument or General Robert E. Lee Monument or variations may refer to:

- Gen. Robert E. Lee Monument (Marianna, Arkansas), listed on the National Register of Historic Places (NRHP)
- Robert E. Lee Monument (New Orleans, Louisiana), NRHP-listed
- Arlington House, The Robert E. Lee Memorial, Arlington, Virginia, NRHP-listed
- Robert E. Lee Monument (Charlottesville, Virginia), NRHP-listed
- Robert E. Lee Monument (Richmond, Virginia), NRHP-listed

== See also ==
- Confederate Monument (disambiguation)
