= Robert E. Lee Hotel =

Robert E. Lee Hotel or Hotel Robert E. Lee or variations may refer to:

- Robert E. Lee Hotel (San Diego, California), listed on the National Register of Historic Places in San Diego County, California
- Robert E. Lee Hotel (St. Louis, Missouri), listed on the National Register of Historic Places in St. Louis County, Missouri
- Hotel Robert E. Lee (Winston-Salem, North Carolina), once the tallest building in Winston-Salem
- Robert E. Lee Hotel (San Antonio, Texas), listed on the National Register of Historic Places in Bexar County, Texas
