= Charles W. and Leah Lee House =

- U.S. National Register of Historic Places
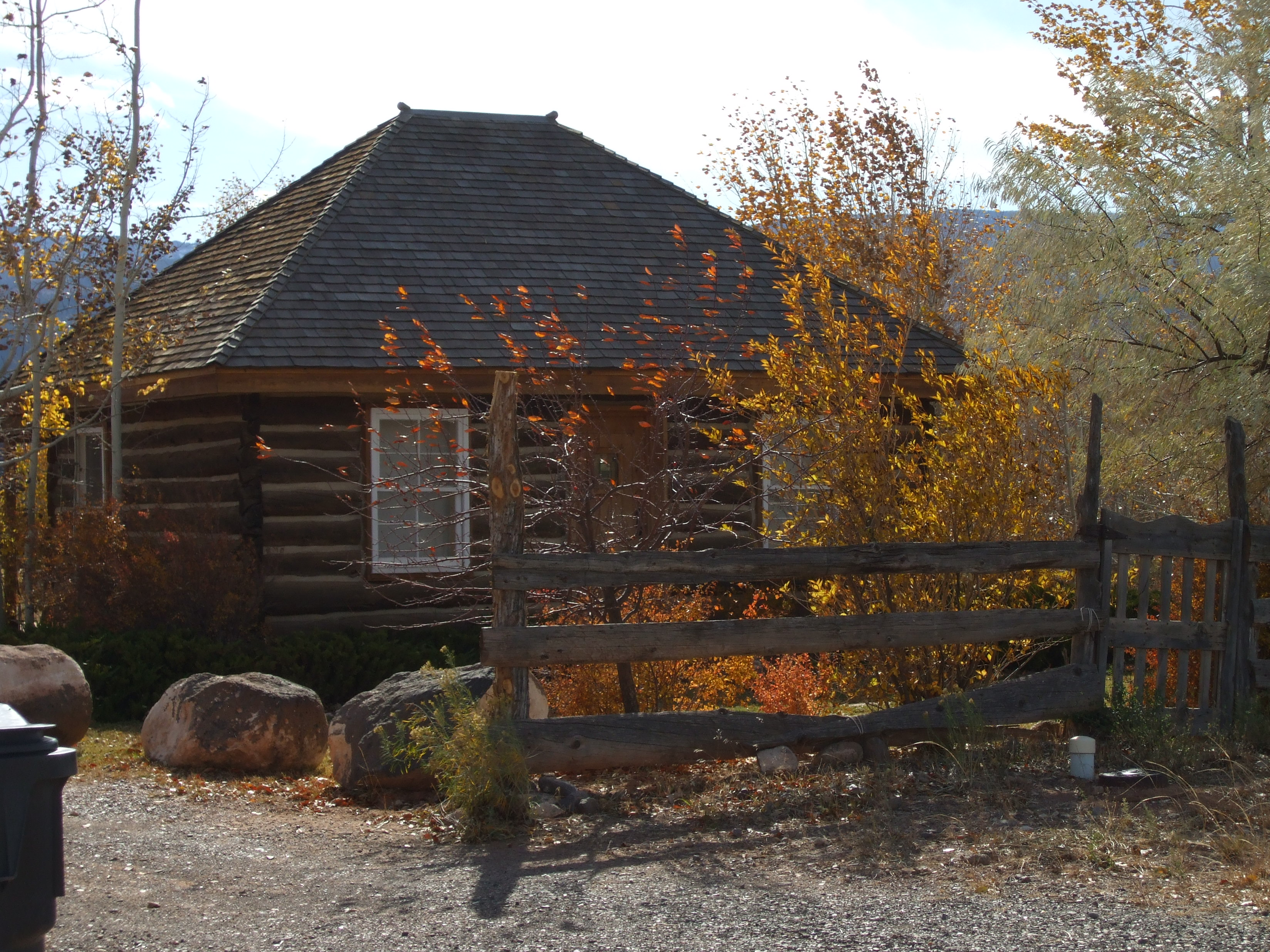
- The house in 2009

- Location within Utah Location within the United States
- Location: 277 West 100 North, Torrey, Utah
- Coordinates: 38°18′02″N 111°25′33″W
- Area: 1.6 acres (0.65 ha)
- Built: 1895
- NRHP reference No.: 96001325
- Added to NRHP: November 15, 1996

The Charles W. and Leah Lee House is a historic one-story log house in Torrey, Utah. It was built in 1895 for Charles William Lee, a blacksmith and horseshoer who lived here with his wife, née Leah Arminda Young. The house was designed in the Folk Victorian style, with a hip roof. It was inherited by the Lees' daughter, Celia, who sold it to Ralph and Cora Heath in 1915. They in turn sold it to J.M. and Evangeline Tappan in 1930. It was listed on the National Register of Historic Places in 1996.
