= Lovett Lee House =

Historic house in North Carolina, United States

- U.S. National Register of Historic Places
- Location within North Carolina Location within the United States
- Location: SR 1725 and SR 1730, near Giddensville, North Carolina
- Coordinates: 35°10′22″N 78°13′1″W
- Area: less than one acre
- Built: 1880
- Architectural style: Late Victorian
- MPS: Sampson County MRA
- NRHP reference No.: 86000567
- Added to NRHP: March 17, 1986

Lovett Lee House is a historic home located near Giddensville, Sampson County, North Carolina. The house was built about 1880, and is a two-story, single pile frame dwelling with Late Victorian style decorative elements. It has a rear ell, hipped roof, and decorative double-tier front porch. The interior follows a central hall plan.

It was added to the National Register of Historic Places in 1986.
