= Lee-Longsworth House =

Historic house in West Virginia, United States

- U.S. National Register of Historic Places
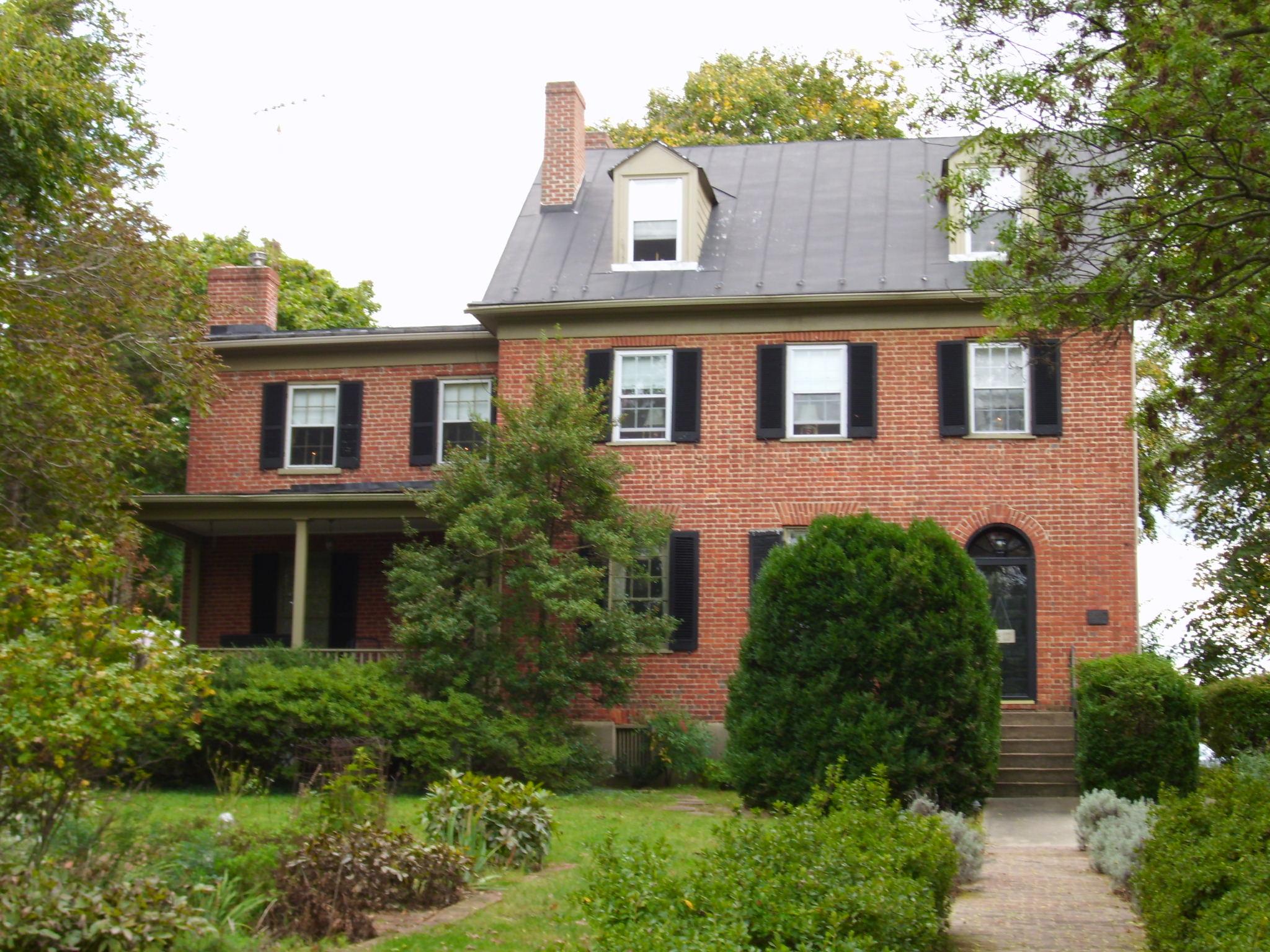

- Location within West Virginia Location within the United States
- Location: Harpers Ferry, West Virginia
- Coordinates: 39°19′32″N 77°44′49″W
- Built: 1800
- Architectural style: Georgian, Federal
- NRHP reference No.: 85002471
- Added to NRHP: September 23, 1985

The Lee-Longsworth House in Bolivar, West Virginia, is an example of the transition from Georgian style architecture to the Federal style. It preserves significant features of interior woodwork, and is associated with the Lee family of Virginia. The property was in 1799 leased by its then owner, Thomas Wilson, to the US Government. At some point after that time, the property was purchased by Richard B. Lee, his wife Elizabeth, Edmond I. Lee and Walton Jones to Ferdinando Fairfax for $3000, subject to the government lease.

Throughout the nineteenth century the house changed hands frequently and was entangled in a number of court proceedings. During the American Civil War it is alleged that Stonewall Jackson occupied the house for a brief time,
