= James Lee House (239 Adams Avenue, Memphis) =

Historic house in Tennessee, United States

- U.S. National Register of Historic Places
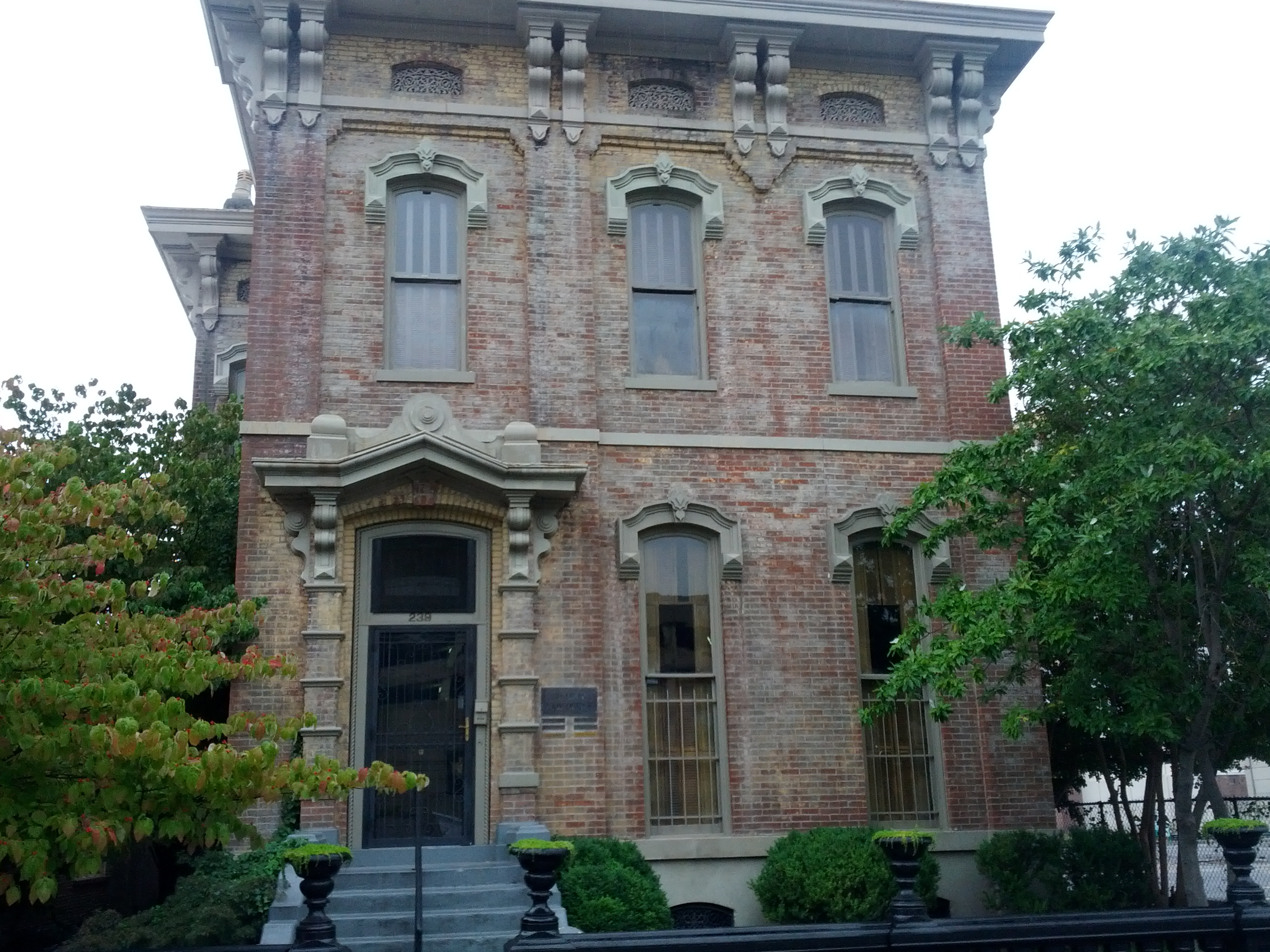
- The James Lee House in 2012

- Location within Tennessee Location within the United States
- Location: 239 Adams Avenue, Memphis, Tennessee
- Coordinates: 35°8′49″N 90°2′51″W
- Area: 0.3 acres (0.12 ha)
- Built: 1869
- NRHP reference No.: 78002633
- Added to NRHP: October 2, 1978

The James Lee House is a historic house in Memphis, Tennessee, U.S.. It was built circa 1869 for James Lee, Sr., the founder of a river steamboat company and an iron works. It was later inherited by his son, James Lee, Jr., a maritime attorney. It has been listed on the National Register of Historic Places since October 2, 1978.
