= Hancock Lee =

American colonial politician (1653–1709)

Hancock Lee (born 1653 - May 25, 1709) was an American colonial politician. He was a member of the House of Burgesses, a Justice of Northampton County, and a naval officer.

== Biography ==
Lee Family Coat of Arms

Hancock Lee was born to Richard Lee I, Esq., progenitor of the Lee Family of Virginia, in 1653. He was justice in Northampton County in 1677, then moved to Northumberland County where he was justice in 1687. He was a burgess in 1688 and 1689.

Lee married (first) Mary Kendall, daughter of William Kendall. Secondly, he married Sarah Allerton, daughter of Isaac Allerton Jr., Esq. Through Sarah Allerton, he had a daughter named Elizabeth Lee, the paternal grandmother of president Zachary Taylor.

He was the owner of multiple estates, including one named Ditchley in Northumberland, Virginia.
