= Lee Hall Mansion =

Historic house in Virginia, United States

- Lee Hall
- U.S. National Register of Historic Places
- Virginia Landmarks Register
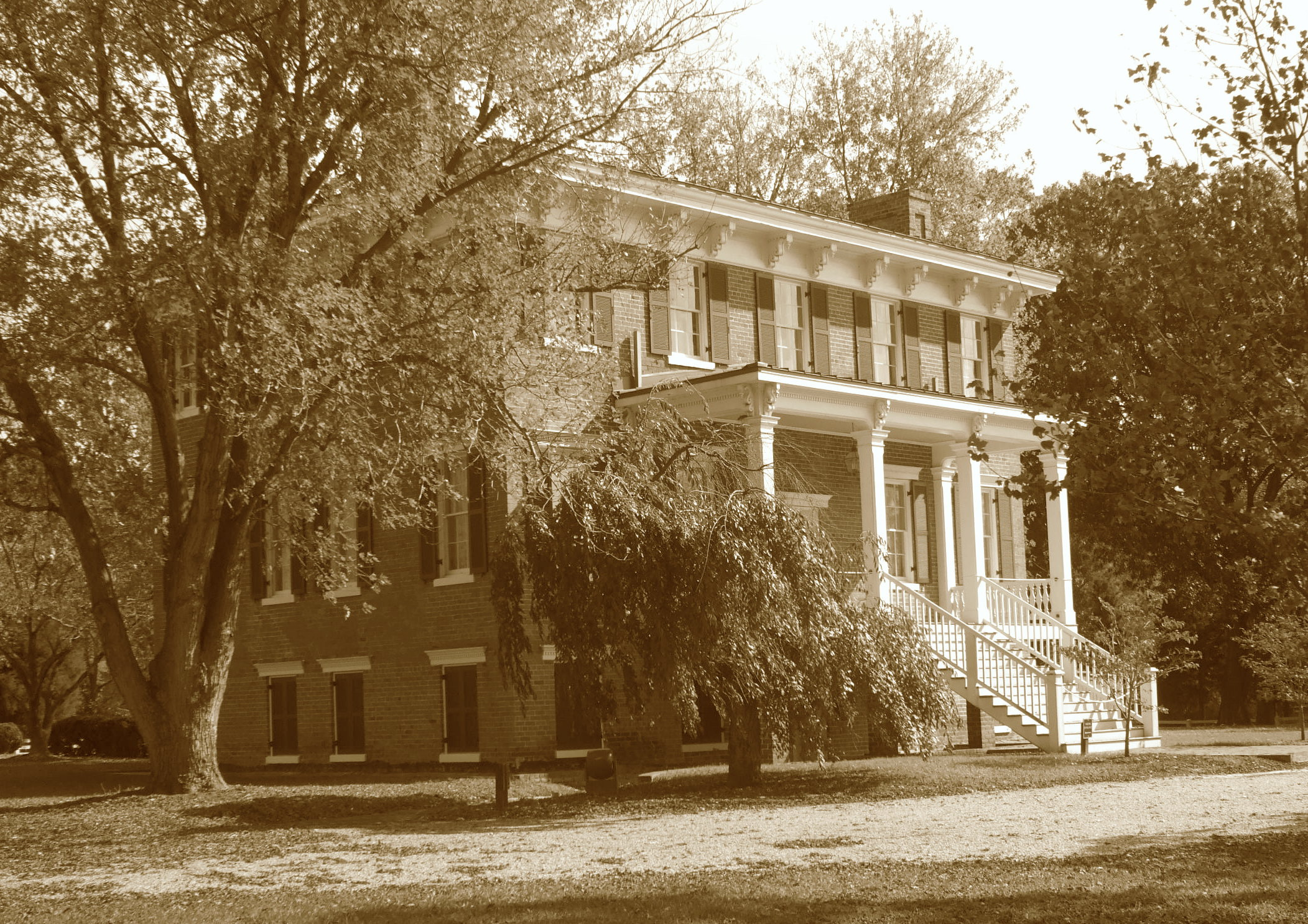
- Lee Hall, October 2007

- Location within Virginia Location within the United States
- Interactive map of Lee Hall
- Location: Near the junction of U.S. 60 and VA 238 in Newport News, Virginia
- Coordinates: 37°11′59″N 76°34′32″W
- Area: 12.29 acres (4.97 ha)
- Built: 1848
- Architectural style: Mixed (more Than 2 Styles From Different Periods)
- NRHP reference No.: 72001510
- VLR No.: 121-0016

Significant dates
- Added to NRHP: December 5, 1972
- Designated VLR: August 15, 1972

Lee Hall or Lee Hall Mansion is a historic brick plantation house that was built during the period from 1848 to 1859. The community of Lee Hall, Virginia, is named for it. The house and village are located near the junction of U.S. 60 and VA 238, in Newport News, Virginia.

The current 12.29-acre (4.97 ha) property was listed on the National Register of Historic Places in 1972. The listed property includes two contributing buildings: The Main House (open to the public) and the former Kitchen (closed to public, used as staff offices).

The house as well as the nearby community of Lee Hall were named for Richard Decatur Lee the original owner and builder of Lee Hall Mansion. Lee was a prominent local planter. Despite having the same last name as Virginia native and Confederate general Robert E. Lee, a direct lineage to General Lee cannot be traced. Lee Hall Mansion was used as headquarters for Confederate generals Joseph E. Johnston and John B. Magruder during the Peninsula Campaign of the American Civil War in 1862. Nearby is Endview Plantation, a 238-year-old house. Endview was used as a hospital during the Civil War and as a campground during the Revolutionary War, the War of 1812 and the Civil War.
