= Leslie Gordon =

Leslie Gordon may refer to:

- Leslie Gordon (cricketer), New Zealand cricketer
- Leslie Howard Gordon, British screenwriter and actor

== See also ==
- Lesley J. Gordon, American military historian
