= Confederate Memorial (Arlington National Cemetery) =

Monument in Virginia (1914–2023)

- United States
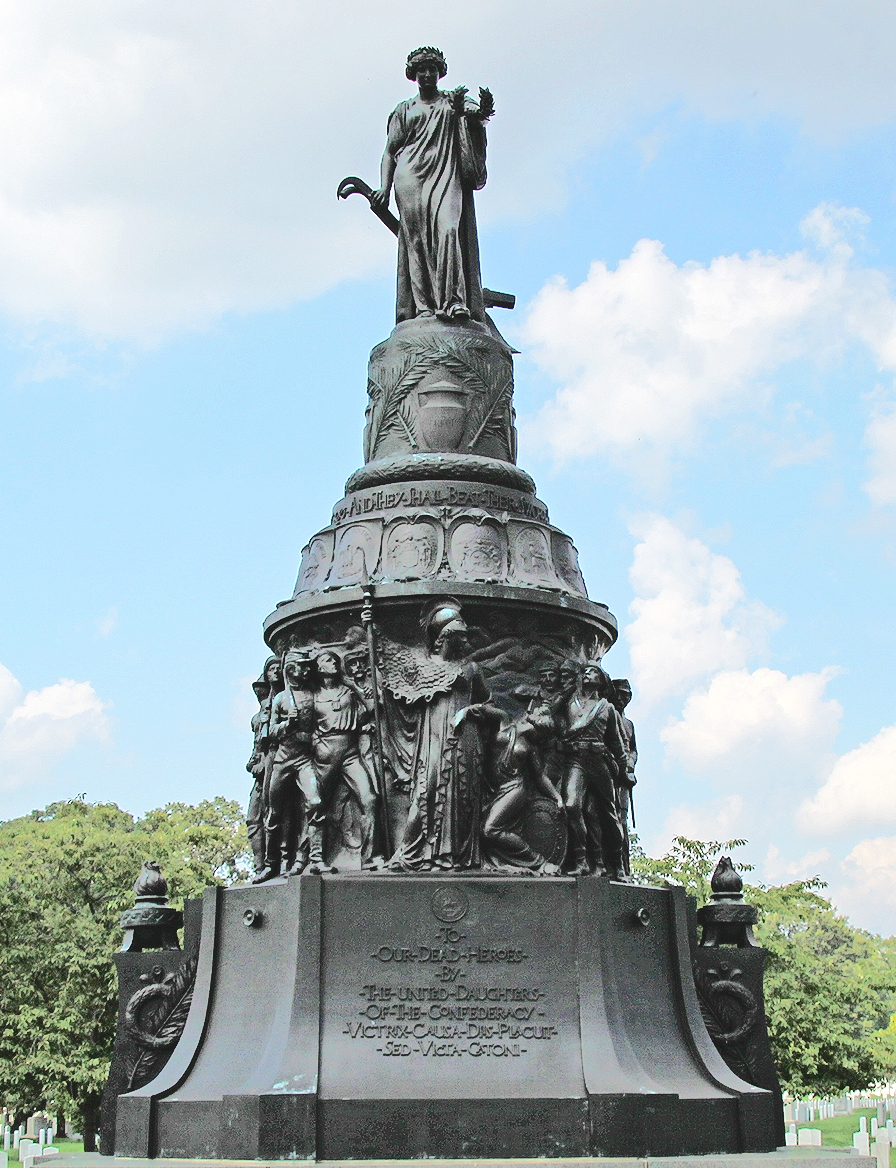
- The Confederate Memorial in 2011
- For soldiers and sailors of the Confederate States of America who died in the American Civil War
- Unveiled: June 4, 1914; 112 years ago
- Removed: December 20, 2023 (removal of statue)
- Location: 38°52′34″N 77°04′38″W near Arlington County, Virginia, U.S. Statue removed, base remains
- Designed by: Moses Jacob Ezekiel

The Confederate Memorial was a memorial at Arlington National Cemetery in Arlington County, Virginia, United States. It commemorated members of the armed forces of the Confederate States of America who died during the American Civil War. Authorized in March 1906, former Confederate soldier and sculptor Moses Jacob Ezekiel was commissioned by the United Daughters of the Confederacy in November 1910 to design the memorial. It was unveiled by President Woodrow Wilson on June 4, 1914, the 106th anniversary of the birth of Jefferson Davis, the President of the Confederate States of America, and removed on December 20, 2023.

During the memorial's presence at Arlington, the grounds changed slightly due to burials and alterations. Some major changes to the memorial were proposed over the years, but none had been implemented until December 2023. Since the memorial's unveiling, most United States presidents have sent a funeral wreath to be laid at the memorial every Memorial Day. Some presidents have declined to do so.

In 2022, the Naming Commission recommended that the Confederate Memorial be removed. Secretary of Defense Lloyd Austin agreed to implement the suggestion, and Arlington National Cemetery made plans for removing and relocating the Confederate Memorial by the start of 2024 at the latest. When the monument was removed, its granite base remained to avoid disturbing nearby graves. In 2025, Secretary of Defense Pete Hegseth stated that the monument would be returned to Arlington National Cemetery and put on display in 2027.

== First Confederate burials at Arlington ==
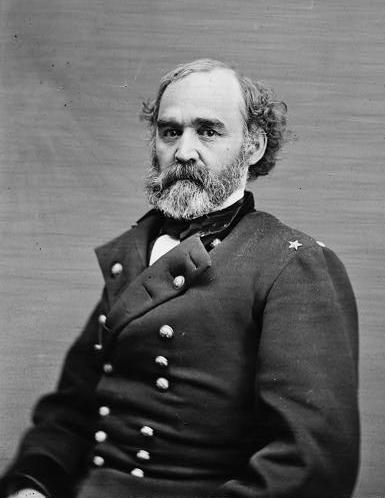
Brigadier General Montgomery C. Meigs instituted a ban on the decoration of Confederate graves at Arlington National Cemetery.

Arlington National Cemetery was established in June 1864 as a cemetery for Union Civil War dead. The first military burial at Arlington – William Henry Christman – was made on May 13, 1864, close to what is now the northeast gate in Section 27. Formal authorization for burials was not given by Major General Montgomery C. Meigs (Quartermaster General of the United States Army) until June 15, 1864.

Confederate military personnel were among those initially buried at Arlington. Some were prisoners of war who died while in custody or who were executed as spies by the Union, but some were battlefield dead, and many were battlefield wounded who died at DC-area hospitals as prisoners of war. For example, in 1865, General Meigs decided to build a monument to Civil War dead in a grove of trees near the flower garden south of the Robert E. Lee mansion at Arlington. The bodies of 2,111 Union and Confederate dead within a 35-mile (56 km) radius of the city of Washington, D.C., were collected. Some of the dead had been interred on the battlefield, but most were full or partial remains discovered unburied where they died in combat. None were identifiable. Although Meigs had not intended to collect the remains of Confederate war dead, the inability to identify remains meant that both Union and Confederate dead were interred below the cenotaph he built. The vault was sealed in September 1866. Other Confederate battlefield dead were also buried at Arlington, and by the end of the war in April 1865 several hundred of the more than 16,000 graves at Arlington contained Confederate dead.

The federal government did not permit the decoration of Confederate graves at the cemetery. As Quartermaster General, Meigs had charge of the Arlington cemetery (he did not retire until February 6, 1882), and he refused to give families of Confederates buried there permission to lay flowers on their loved ones' graves. In 1868, when families asked to lay flowers on Confederate graves on Decoration Day (now known as Memorial Day), Meigs ordered that the families be barred from the cemetery. Union veterans' organizations such as the Grand Army of the Republic (GAR; whose membership was open only to Union soldiers) also felt that rebel graves should not be decorated. In 1869, GAR members stood watch over Confederate graves at Arlington National Cemetery to ensure they were not visibly honored on Decoration Day. Cemetery officials also refused to allow the erection of any monument to Confederate dead and declined to permit new Confederate burials (either by reburial or following the death of veterans).

=== The 1898 McKinley speech ===
The federal government's policy toward Confederate graves at Arlington National Cemetery changed at the end of the 19th century.

The 10-week Spanish–American War of 1898 marked the first time since prior to the Civil War that Americans from all states, North and South, were involved in a military conflict with a foreign power. After the Spanish–American War ended in August, a series of celebrations ("peace jubilees") were held in major cities in the United States from October through December. Many Southerners were lukewarm in their support for the war and for President William McKinley's territorial expansion in Cuba and the Philippines, and it was not clear that the Treaty of Paris (the agreement ending the Spanish–American War) would win the approval of the United States Senate.

President McKinley made a 2,000-mile (3,200 km) trip across the Deep South by train in December 1898 to promote Senate ratification of the Treaty of Paris and racial harmony. (Note: In November 1898, white supremacists affiliated with the Democratic Party led an insurrection against a coalition of white Republicans and African Americans who won the mayoralty and all council seats in the city of Wilmington, North Carolina. The Wilmington massacre of 1898 lasted several days, led to many black deaths, and caused the mass exodus of 2,000 blacks from the city (turning Wilmington from a black-majority city into a white-majority city). McKinley refused to intervene in the insurrection, and was strongly criticized by African Americans for his inaction. Part of the reason for his Southern train tour was to show black Southerners that he still supported them and wanted improved race relations in the United States.) McKinley saw untended Confederate graves in Fredericksburg, Virginia, during his campaign for the presidency in 1896, and the sight bothered him. In his speech at the Atlanta Peace Jubilee on December 14, 1898, McKinley not only celebrated the end of sectionalism but also announced that the federal government would now begin tending Confederate graves since these dead represented "a tribute to American valor". The speech impressed many Southerners, who saw it as a grand gesture of reconciliation and a symbol of national unification.

== Creation of the Confederate section ==
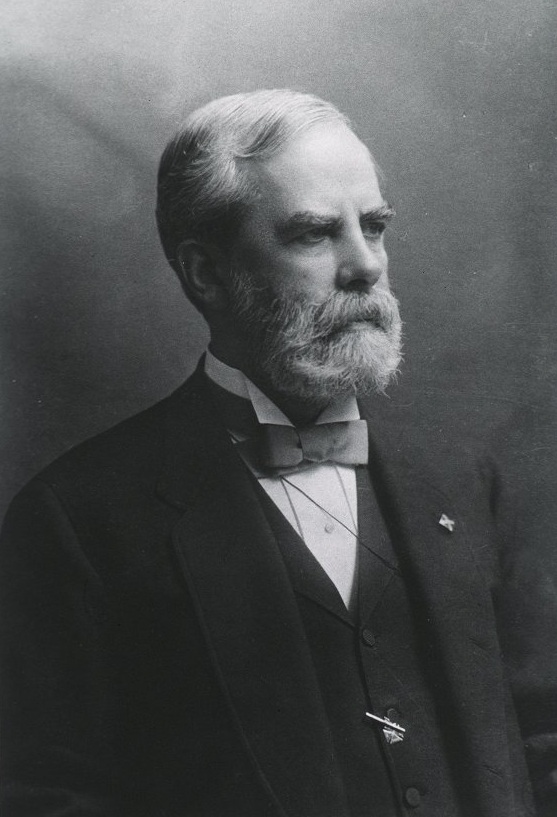
Dr. Samuel E. Lewis, 1904

The McKinley speech encouraged Dr. Samuel E. Lewis to seek additional improvements to the care and treatment of Confederate graves. Lewis, a former Confederate States Army (CSA) surgeon who then practiced medicine in Washington, D.C., was the leader ("commander") of the Charles Broadway Rouss Camp No. 1191 of the United Confederate Veterans (UCV), a veterans organization for those who fought for the Confederacy. (Note: Camp No. 171 was the original UCV chapter in Washington, D.C. Camp No. 1191 split off in May 1899 in protest against the way Camp 171 was being operated. See: "Organized a New Camp". The Washington Post. May 4, 1899.) Lewis had inventoried all Confederate graves at Arlington National Cemetery in early fall 1898 as part of the local group's historic documentation efforts. He discovered 136 identifiable Confederate graves, far more than the six or seven cemetery officials assumed existed. The graves were scattered all over the existing burial grounds, and the headstones were similar to those of civilian employees and African American "contrabands" (runaway slaves). The similarity to the headstones of black people especially angered Lewis. In early 1899, his group discovered another 189 graves in the Soldiers' Home National Cemetery in the District of Columbia.

On June 5, 1899, Lewis and other Confederate veterans sent a petition to President McKinley asking that the Confederate dead at Arlington be disinterred and reburied in a "Confederate section". McKinley approved of the idea. Former Confederate Brigadier General Marcus Joseph Wright (by 1898 an agent of the War Department collecting Confederate war records) drafted legislation to approve the reinterments, and Senator Joseph Roswell Hawley (a former brevet major general of volunteers for the Union) introduced it in Congress. Congress approved the bill in 1900 and authorized $2,500 for the plan, which specified that the reburials occur near the field where Spanish–American War dead had recently been interred. McKinley signed the bill into law on June 6, 1900. A list of the dead at both Arlington and the Soldiers' Home was published so that families who wished to do so might remove their loved ones' remains from Arlington and reinter them closer to home.

=== Opposition to the section ===
After June 1900, however, several women's groups—among them the United Daughters of the Confederacy (UDC) and the Ladies of the Hollywood Memorial Association (Note: The association maintained Hollywood Cemetery in Richmond, Virginia. A large number of Confederate troops and generals as well as Confederate President Jefferson Davis were buried there. It is considered the South's premier cemetery, as former presidents James Monroe and John Tyler are also buried there. See: Yalom, p. 260.)—opposed allowing any Confederate dead to remain at Arlington. The reasons for this resistance were complex and varied. Most of the women's societies argued that Confederate dead should lie in Southern soil, Confederate families should not rely on Union "charity" (e.g., free grave space at Arlington), the GAR would desecrate the graves, and Confederate soldiers should rest among their comrades in Southern cemeteries. Some of the women's societies also saw reburial of Confederate dead in the South as a way of maintaining their relevance and recruiting new members, while others wanted reburial in the South so they could erect pro-Confederate monuments over the graves. Some groups perceived the offer of a Confederate section at Arlington as a sign of Southern accommodationism with the United States. Competition between different women's societies also played a role. For example, the Confederate Southern Memorial Association (CSMA) also opposed the creation of a Confederate section at Arlington. The CSMA was formed in 1900 as an umbrella group for the ladies' memorial associations, which were rapidly losing members. The CSMA feared being absorbed by the UDC, which had formed in 1894 both as a commemorative body and as a benevolent society for Confederate women and patriotic goals. The CSMA sought a way to differentiate itself from the larger body, and so advocated reburial, too—but not in Richmond (as the UDC did) but in local towns and cities throughout the South.

To overcome this opposition, Lewis tried to identify support for a "Confederate section" as well as convince the administration to proceed. He secured the endorsement of a Confederate section by a number of former high-ranking Confederate officers. He also polled other chapters of the United Confederate Veterans and found they approved of the legislation as well. Lewis and his supporters argued that only the federal government had the financial resources to adequately maintain the large number of Confederate graves found at Arlington and the Soldiers' Home, and that failing to spend the $2,500 appropriation would discourage Congress from protecting Confederate graves in the future. Critically, Lewis won the support of Hilary A. Herbert, an Alabamian and former colonel in the 8th Regiment Alabama Infantry who served in the United States House of Representatives from 1877 to 1893 and as Secretary of the Navy under President Grover Cleveland. Herbert argued that leaving the Confederate graves at Arlington made a greater impression on the public than isolating them in the pro-Confederate South.

Lewis's efforts convinced most members of Congress and relevant administration officials that the women's groups represented only a small minority of Southerners. He did so in part by winning the support of other key Southern groups. First he won over his own organization, the United Confederate Veterans, which in March 1901 unanimously passed resolutions asking the government to proceed with creation of the Confederate section. He also won the support of the Ladies Southern Relief Society, an important Confederate women's group in Washington, D.C. Lewis also won over Congress and the administration by undermining the UDC and CSMA's opposition to the reburial plan. Once more working through his own veterans' group, the UCV convinced a number of government officials that the CSMA was too new (just a year old) to accurately represent Southern views. Lewis dampened the outcry by the CSMA and other ladies' memorial associations by convincing them that their importance in the South would be maintained. Lewis realized that these groups continued to thrive in part because they set the dates for and organized Civil War commemorations. Lewis convinced the CSMA and many Southern women's groups that they would be able to do so at Arlington as well, which would enhance their prestige. These tactics worked: In the late spring of 1901, a delegation from several Confederate veterans' groups visited Secretary of War Elihu Root and convinced him to proceed with the reburials at Arlington.

=== Process of reburial ===
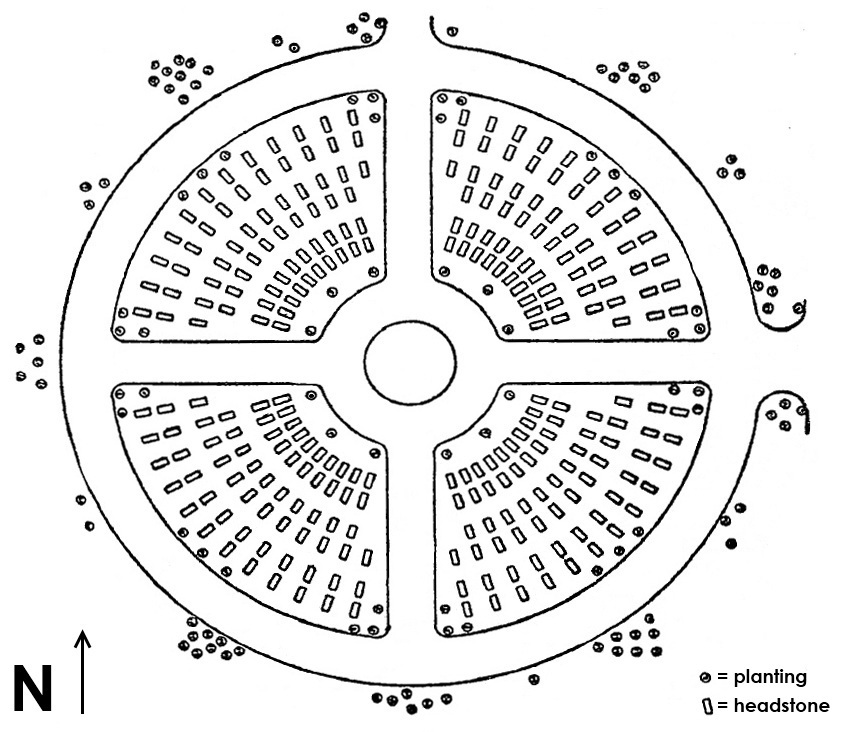
The 1903 layout of the burials in the Confederate section.

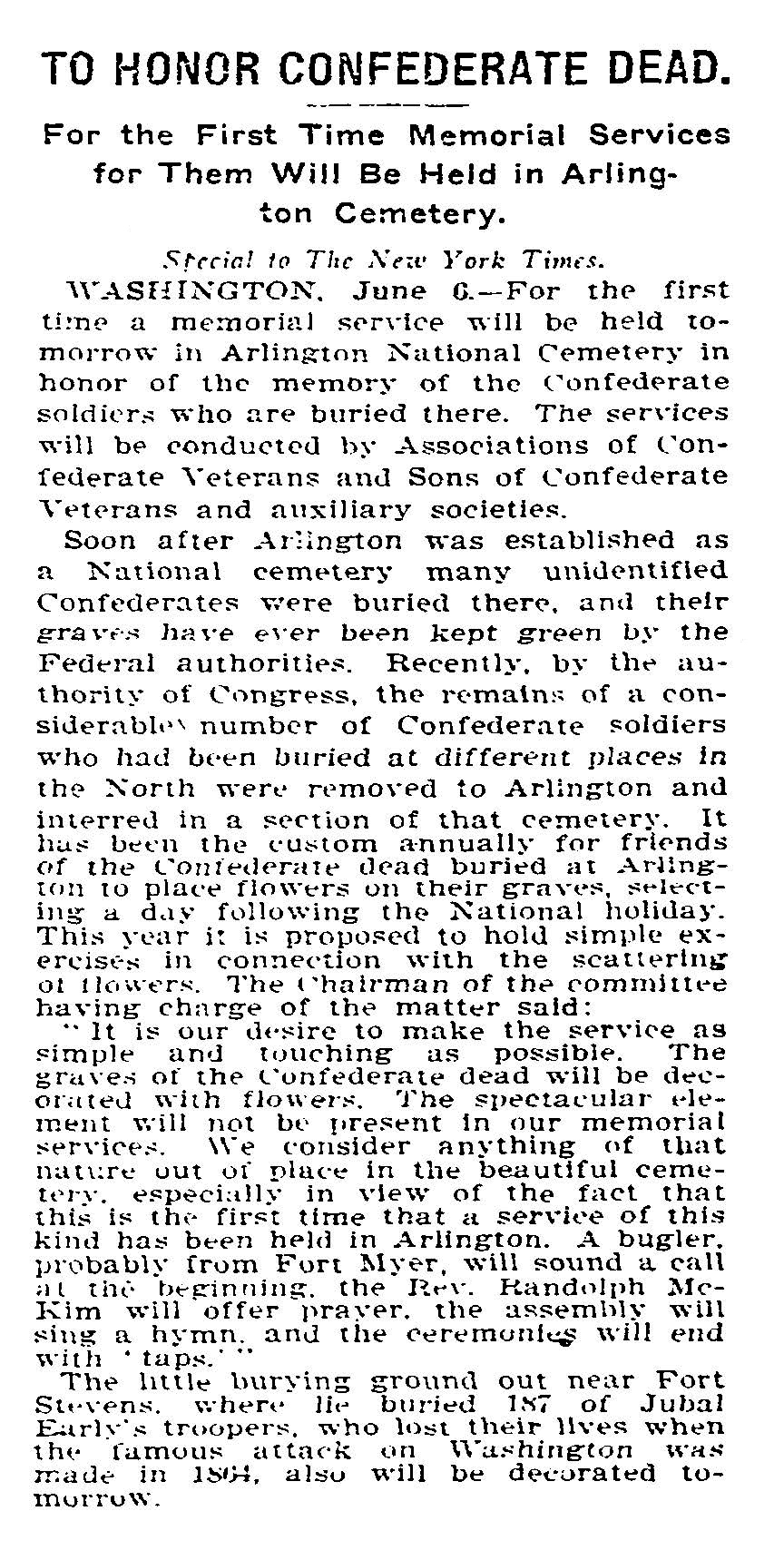
"To Honor Confederate Dead; For the First Time Memorial Services for Them Will Be Held in Arlington Cemetery" — The New York Times, June 6, 1903

After the process of informing families ended, reburials began in April 1901 and were completed the following October. It is unclear how many Confederate dead were disinterred and reburied in the new Confederate section. In 1912, the House Committee on Appropriations observed that legal authority existed for interment of 264 Confederate soldiers—128 of which came from the Soldiers' Home National Cemetery and 136 of which came from Arlington National Cemetery. More modern sources provide different numbers, however. One historian says just 128 bodies were reinterred, although the majority of sources say 264 or 267 bodies were reburied. Other sources pin the number of reinterments at 265, 409, 482, and 500 bodies. Discrepancies may be attributable to a law, the Act of August 24, 1912 (37 Stat. 440), which permitted any Confederate veteran living in or near Washington, D.C., to be buried in the Confederate section at Arlington.

The Confederate dead were reburied on 3.5 acres (14,000 m^{2}) of ground on the west side of Arlington National Cemetery. The graves were laid out in a pattern of concentric circles, rather than straight rows as elsewhere at Arlington, to emphasize the South's attempt to find its place in the new united country. Landscaping of the area was completed in the spring of 1903.

The 1899 legislation required the federal government to provide a standard issue tombstone for the new Confederate graves. These headstones were 36 inches (91 cm) tall, 10 inches (25 cm) wide, and 4 inches (10 cm) thick. They were made of granite or marble, as the others in the cemetery were. The tops of these markers were pointed, to make the Confederate graves stand out from Union ones (not, as legend would have it, so that Northerners would not sit on them and desecrate them). Each marker was inscribed with a number, the name of the deceased, the regiment in which the individual served, and the inscription "C.S.A."

The first Confederate Memorial Day observances at Arlington National Cemetery were held on June 7, 1903.

== Initial efforts ==
War Department officials laid out the circular pattern of the graves in the Confederate section. The circular area contained a cruciform set of walkways whose north-south axis was parallel to the road that is now McPherson Drive. At the intersection of the walkways was a grassy area surrounded by a circular path. Although the 1900 reburial legislation did not mention a memorial, on its maps the Army Corps of Engineers marked this central grassy area with an "M"—indicating that it was reserved for a memorial. (Note: Hilary A. Herbert argued that it was Congress' intent for a memorial to be erected in the Confederate section. See: "Seek Aid for Shaft." The Sunday Star. February 2, 1912.) This did not go unnoticed by Confederate groups, several of which began independently discussing the construction of a memorial as soon as it became clear that the Army would allow one to be built in the Confederate section.

One of the groups that sought to build a memorial was the United Daughters of the Confederacy (UDC). Mrs. Mary Taliaferro Thompson of Stonewall Jackson Chapter No. 20 (Note: The UDC is divided into state divisions, with each state containing one or more chapters, or local bodies. Many early local chapters were named for a Confederate general or statesman.) (located in Washington, D.C.) asked the War Department in 1902 for permission to construct a memorial in the Confederate section. Her request was not granted. She asked again in 1903 and 1905, but was turned down each time. Nonetheless, various UDC chapters, convinced that they would eventually be successful, began raising money for a memorial. In 1904, Robert E. Lee Chapter No. 644, UDC (also located in Washington, D.C.) began raising money for a monument. It had about $111 ($3,977 in 2025 dollars) by the end of February 1904, and later raised $1,000 ($35,833 in 2025 dollars). Stonewall Jackson Chapter No. 20 also raised $1,000.

Mrs. Thompson tried again to win approval for a monument in 1906. This time she was successful, in large part because she worked closely with Representative John Sharp Williams (D-Mississippi), the influential House Minority Leader. On March 4, 1906, Secretary of War William Howard Taft gave the UDC permission to erect a memorial in the center of the Confederate section at Arlington. Taft's letter, however, reserved to the War Department the right to approve the monument's design and inscriptions. (Note: There is nothing in the record to indicate that the UDC submitted the draft or final design of the memorial or its inscriptions to the War Department for review or approval.) On March 13, 1906, Lizzie George Henderson, President-General of the UDC, accepted Taft's terms.

Taft's letter was made public by Rep. Williams at Confederate Memorial Day ceremonies at Arlington National Cemetery on June 4, 1906. Williams called for a monument to be built, and suggested an inscription (which was not used). He then donated the first $50 toward the memorial's construction.

=== Forming the ACMA ===
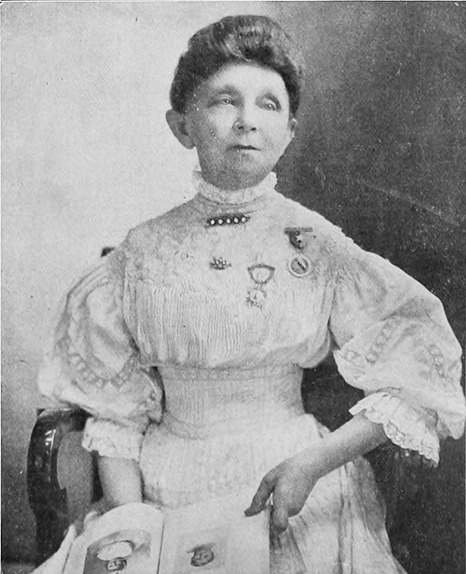
Cornelia Branch Stone in 1908. Mrs. Stone conducted most of the fund-raising for the Confederate Memorial, and chaired the design committee.

The Arlington Confederate Memorial Association (ACMA) was founded in 1906, although sources differ as to the exact date. On June 7, 1906, John M. Hickey of Camp No. 171, United Confederate Veterans, submitted a resolution to his local chapter authorizing the establishment of a committee on "ways and means" to erect the memorial. According to Hilary A. Herbert, the resolution in its final form established the ACMA. But historian Karen Cox puts the organization's founding at a meeting organized by Thompson and sponsored by the UDC on November 6, 1906. Local news media, however, reported that the founding occurred on December 28, 1906, when Confederate organizations in Washington, D.C., met under the auspices of Camp 171. Even the list of founding directors is not agreed upon. Herbert says the board consisted of himself as well as Hickey, J.T. Callaghan, James McDowell Carrington, F.M. Hare, the Reverend Doctor Randolph H. McKim, and Judge Seth Shepard. The Washington Post, however, did not list Callaghan, Carrington, or Hare and instead included former Brigadier General Frank Crawford Armstrong (CSA), former Missouri Senator Francis M. Cockrell, and former West Virginia Senator Charles J. Faulkner.

It quickly became apparent, however, that the scope of work under discussion by the ACMA would overwhelm the small board of directors. Herbert records that the ACMA submitted a petition in November 1906 asking the UDC to support the ACMA organizationally and financially. This resolution was approved by the UDC. But still the work overwhelmed the ACMA. By mid-1907, it was clear that the UDC would have to completely take over the memorial's fund-raising, design, and construction. (Note: Cox argues it was the lack of funds which led the ACMA to turn over its work to the UDC. She points out that only about $1,000 ($34,554 in 2025 dollars) had been raised by November 1907. It is difficult to reconcile Cox's claim with numerous other reports, cited elsewhere in this article, that indicate the ACMA had $3,000 to $4,000 on hand, and pledges of $10,000. Furthermore, the ACMA's decision to allow the UDC to support the monument project was made in November 1906, and UDC completely took over the project in June 1907. Citing the November 1907 fund-raising levels seems irrelevant to the June 1907 decision to transfer the ACMA's duties to the UDC. See: Cox, "The Confederate Monument at Arlington...", p. 151.) On June 19, 1907, Mrs. Lizzie George Henderson, President-General of the UDC, asked the ACMA to delegate its functions to the UDC, with the UDC and Sons of Confederate Veterans (SCV) retaining certain powers to themselves. The ACMA quickly agreed.

The UDC asked Cornelia Branch Stone (a member of Veuve Jefferson Davis Chapter No. 17 in Galveston, Texas, and chair of the UDC committee which awarded the organization's Southern Cross of Honor) (Note: Cornelia Branch Stone was the wife of businessman Henry Clay Stone, a Virginian who took up residence in Galveston, Texas. Her father was Edward Thomas Branch, who fought in the Texas Revolution, served in the Congress of the Republic of Texas, was an Associate Justice of the Texas Supreme Court, and served in the Texas House of Representatives. She was a fierce advocate for women's involvement in the political process, president of the Texas Federation of Women's Clubs, and the aunt of Representative Clay Stone Briggs. See: Logan. p. 493; Dod, Josh. "Galveston: Isle women played role in suffrage movement." August 26, 2010; "For Many Years a Prominent Galvestonian; Funeral Thursday." Galveston Daily News. January 19, 1925.) to meet with representatives from the ACMA's founding organizations and reorganize the association. The first meeting occurred on December 12, 1907, but no agreement was reached. (Stone noted that Charles Broadway Rouse Camp No. 1191 declined to participate.) A second meeting on December 21 led to the ACMA's agreement to re-establish itself as a constituent body of the UDC.

A committee was appointed by the UDC to revise the ACMA's articles of incorporation. Under the new articles, the President-General of the UDC became the ex officio President of the ACMA. The board of directors consisted of a representative from each state in which the UDC had a chapter, with this individual to be appointed by the President-General of the UDC in consultation with the UDC state division president. An Executive Committee was also created. Its membership consisted of representatives from UCV Camp No. 171 and Camp No. 1191; one representative from Camp No. 172 of the SCV; and three representatives to be appointed by the five UDC chapters in the District of Columbia. The executive committee was empowered to appoint (with concurrence of the president) a nine-member Advisory Board, which was chaired by the association's treasurer.

The association's new officers consisted of a president, first and second vice presidents, corresponding and recording secretaries, and a treasurer. An Executive Board oversaw the organization between meetings of the board of directors. The executive board consisted of the first vice president (who served as chairman), treasurer, recording secretary, and corresponding secretary. A representative chosen from the board of directors served as its vice-chairman, and five other members of the board of directors served as members of the executive board.

The ACMA's first president was Cornelia Branch Stone, who served from 1907 to 1909.

For its part, the UDC supervised the work of the ACMA through a committee composed of eight delegates from each of the five chapters of the UDC then extant in the District of Columbia. The ex officio chairman of the committee was the President of the Division of the District of Columbia. An advisory committee was also established, which consisted of four members from UCV Camp No. 171, four members from UCV Charles Broadway Rouss Camp No. 1191, and four members from each chapter of the Sons of Confederate Veterans in the District of Columbia. These two committees were established to oversee the work of the ACMA. But, in fact, the UDC agreed to accept the work of the ACMA "without conditions"—which meant the UDC had no real control over the memorial.

=== Fund-raising ===
During the period between the ACMA's formation and its reconstitution, the UDC contributed $500 ($17,917 in 2025 dollars). The Washington Post reported that the ACMA had $3,000 to $4,000 ($107,500 to $143,333 in 2025 dollars) on hand in December 1906, with a goal of raising $25,000 ($895,833 in 2025 dollars). Furthermore, the UDC agreed to donate $1,500 ($53,750 in 2025 dollars) annually beginning in 1907 until the memorial was finished.

Fund-raising occurred rapidly during Stone's tenure as president, but there are conflicting accounts of just how much money was raised over the next several years. In July 1907, the press reported that multi-millionaire stockbroker Thomas Fortune Ryan donated $10,000 ($345,536 in 2025 dollars) to the Confederate monument fund. But according to Hilary A. Herbert, the ACMA's First Vice President and the chief executive officer of the association, the ACMA had raised just $3,460 ($119,555 in 2025 dollars) by November 1907. To boost fund-raising, the ACMA sought and won the endorsement of several prominent individuals. Former CSA Lieutenant General Stephen D. Lee strongly endorsed the memorial project in September 1907 and asked all UCV camps to contribute to the fund-raising drive. In February 1908, President Theodore Roosevelt also endorsed the project in very strong terms. By November 1908, the ACMA reported $8,230 ($294,908 in 2025 dollars) in funds raised. This sum increased to just under $13,000 ($465,833 in 2025 dollars) in 1909, and to just under $20,000 ($691,071 in 2025 dollars) in 1910.

In 1910, the UDC sold Christmas Seals to raise money for the memorial. Mrs. Edgar James, UDC member from Florence, Alabama, designed the seals, of which several million were printed. The goal was to raise the remaining $35,000 needed for the memorial, although it is unclear how many Christmas Seals were purchased. By the estimate of the UDC Christmas Seals Committee, $247 ($8,535 in 2025 dollars) was raised in 1910 and $230 ($7,947 in 2025 dollars) in 1911, whereas just over $700 ($23,353 in 2025 dollars) was raised in 1912. In 1916, in an unofficial UDC treasurer's report printed in the magazine Confederate Veteran, the association reported a total of $1,874 ($55,446 in 2025 dollars) in total from Christmas Seals sales.

== Designing the memorial ==
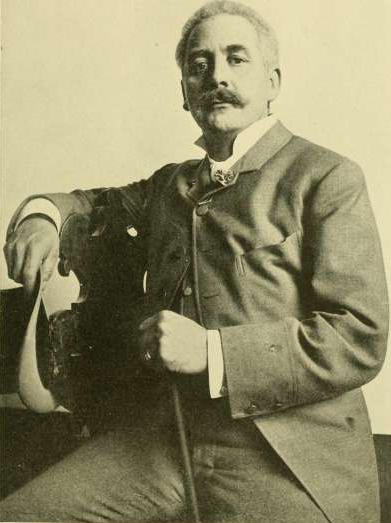
Moses Ezekiel in 1914.

=== Choosing an artist ===
Stone stepped down as both UDC and ACMA President in October 1909. One of her last acts was to propose the appointment of a memorial design committee. She suggested creating a seven-member committee and offered for the delegates' consideration the names for six people who might serve on the committee. She asked the UDC convention to ratify her choice as well as pick a seventh member to act as chair. The convention approved her resolution, and selected Stone as the seventh member. Sources vary as to who was on the design committee. According to Herbert, the six members included Mrs. Marion Butler, Hilary A. Herbert, Mrs. Thomas W. Keith, the Rev. Dr. McKim, Judge Seth Shepard, and Wallace Streater. Cornelia Branch Stone provides almost the same list, but omits Herbert and includes Mrs. Virginia Faulkner McSherry.

The process for selecting an artist to design the memorial was somewhat convoluted. Many artists made inquiries with the UDC about designing the memorial in 1909, and some submitted proposals, but the ACMA declined to consider any design because it was still raising funds. The design committee first met on May 16, 1910. Rev. McKim made the motion that the memorial should depict an event in which General Robert E. Lee attempted to ride into the Battle of the Wilderness to rally his troops. Lee was stopped by a private who seized the bridle of Lee's horse and prevented him from going, declaring that the troops would rally themselves. His motion was accepted. Herbert submitted the proposed design to an undisclosed artist to have a model developed and to get an aesthetic opinion about McKim's idea.

Several criticisms were made of the proposal, and at the design committee's next meeting on October 31, 1910, McKim withdrew his suggestion. McKim then proposed that an artist of national renown be selected to propose a design. Hilary Herbert recommended Moses Ezekiel, a Confederate Army veteran and well-known artist (Note: Herbert implies that other artists were contacted. See: Herbert, p. 18.) who was already one of the top sculptors of Confederate images in the United States.

The UDC was worried that Ezekiel would turn them down. For one, he was rumored to be highly temperamental. For another, he had lost several competitions for federal Civil War monuments (including the prominent Admiral David G. Farragut memorial in Washington, D.C.), and Ezekiel was on public record against art competitions. To placate him, the UDC design committee agreed ahead of time to give Ezekiel complete artistic authority in designing the memorial.

=== Meetings with Moses Ezekiel ===
Ezekiel had already heard about the planned Confederate Memorial long before being contacted by the design committee, and had already conceived a design. Ezekiel lived in Italy, but had returned to the United States on May 24, 1910, for the dedication of his life-size bronze statue of Thomas Jefferson outside the Rotunda at the University of Virginia. He visited President William Howard Taft at the White House before traveling to the university, and it was while waiting to see Taft that the idea for the Confederate Memorial came to him.

Herbert and the author Thomas Nelson Page (a friend of Ezekiel's) visited with the sculptor in Washington, D.C., on November 5, 1910. (Note: Cox says this occurred in spring 1911. See: Cox, "The Confederate Monument at Arlington...", p. 153. Her claim is contradicted by numerous primary and secondary sources.) Ezekiel expressed his intense desire to obtain the commission. Herbert, Page, and Ezekiel then visited the Confederate section at Arlington National Cemetery and discussed the size and placement of the memorial. Ezekiel sketched out his idea on a piece of paper for the two men. He also made it clear that he would work in Italy, and would not accept any design input from the ACMA. The following day, the design committee held an emergency meeting. Dr. McKim could not attend, but advised the committee that he approved of Ezekiel's selection. Mrs. Keith also could not attend, but offered no proxy. At the emergency meeting, Ezekiel outlined his proposal for the memorial: a heroic female figure symbolic of the South with a wreath in one hand and the other resting on a plow, standing atop a circular base around which figures representing the sacrifices of the South were grouped.

The design committee was deeply impressed with Ezekiel's proposal and offered the commission to him. On November 7, Ezekiel signed a contract to design and manufacture the memorial. (Note: Hilary Herbert says the contract was signed November 5, but this seems unlikely given that the design committee met that same day for the first time in six months. Thomas Nelson Page gives the date of the contract as November 7, which seems more likely. See: Herbert, p. 17; United Daughters of the Confederacy, Minutes of the Twentieth Annual Convention..., p. 347, accessed 2013-10-30.) The finished memorial was to be delivered by November 1913 at a cost of $10,000 ($345,536 in 2025 dollars). Art historian Timothy Sedore says Ezekiel accepted the commission only because he had final control over the design. Hilary Herbert also agrees that Ezekiel was given a free hand. UDC historian Karen L. Cox, however, says that the ACMA design committee worked with Ezekiel to ensure that the memorial adhered to the theme of "peace for the living and honor to the dead".

=== Working out the design ===
The UDC convention opened in Little Rock, Arkansas, just three days after the contract with Ezekiel was signed. Excited by the news that Moses Ezekiel had won the design commission, convention attendees voted to increase the cost of the memorial by $15,000 ($518,304 in 2025 dollars) to $50,000 ($1,727,679 in 2025 dollars) to make it larger and grander. Of this amount, $10,000 ($345,536) was set aside for shipping the memorial to the United States from Italy and for its erection at Arlington National Cemetery.

Upon learning of the funding increase, Ezekiel immediately made a new, larger model. He increased the number of figures around the lower portion of the base to 32 from 15, and changed the base from granite to bronze. (Note: Ezekiel appears to have increased the number of life-size figures to 32 some time after February 1912, as media reports at the time still had the number of figures at 15. But the change to bronze from granite for the base occurred before then. See: "South to Honor Dead". The Washington Post. February 4, 1912.)

Ezekiel felt that the monument was the most important commission he ever worked on, and he refused all other work so that he could devote all his time to it. He also discouraged visitors from coming to his Rome studio so that there would be little public discussion of his design. Nonetheless, some changes were made in response to comments made by visitors to his workshop. For example, Ezekiel originally intended for the shield against which the fallen woman leans to be inscribed with the words "free trade" and "state's rights". He changed the words to "Constitution" after a visit to his studio by a friend. (Note: Another change, less well-documented, was recorded by the Washington Evening Star newspaper, which alleged that one of the allegorical figure groups around the mount was intended to show a wounded soldier being nursed back to health by a Southern woman. This figure group does not appear on the final memorial. See: "Plan for Unveiling." Washington Evening Star. November 11, 1912.)

In time, the ACMA design committee began asking Ezekiel for design details, clearly with a mind toward reviewing his work. He declined to give them. But with work on his design nearly complete in late 1911, Ezekiel began sending occasional photographs of his work to the ACMA design committee. He asked, however, that these be kept private to reduce interference with his work. A two-thirds size model was finished in early 1912.

=== Fund-raising to cover enlarged design ===
Additional fundraising occurred after 1910 to raise the money to cover the additional cost. A number of small donations came from Union soldiers, with the 23rd New Jersey Regiment contributing $100 ($3,258). Ezekiel agreed to donate his services as sculptor, so that all the money set aside for the memorial could go toward the purchase of raw bronze and for the memorial's casting. By February 1912, $24,000 ($800,690) still needed to be raised. Over the next four months, an additional $4,000 ($133,448) came in.

As casting on the memorial neared completion in November 1913, the ACMA announced that it had raised $50,443 ($1,643,186 in 2025 dollars), of which $3,517 ($114,569 in 2025 dollars) went to construction of the concrete foundation, fund-raising, and expenses associated with the cornerstone-laying ceremony. Just over $12,700 ($413,712 in 2025 dollars) had been raised in 1913 alone. As of November 1914, a total of $56,262 ($1,808,421 in 2025 dollars) had been raised for the memorial.

== Building the memorial ==
=== Laying the cornerstone ===
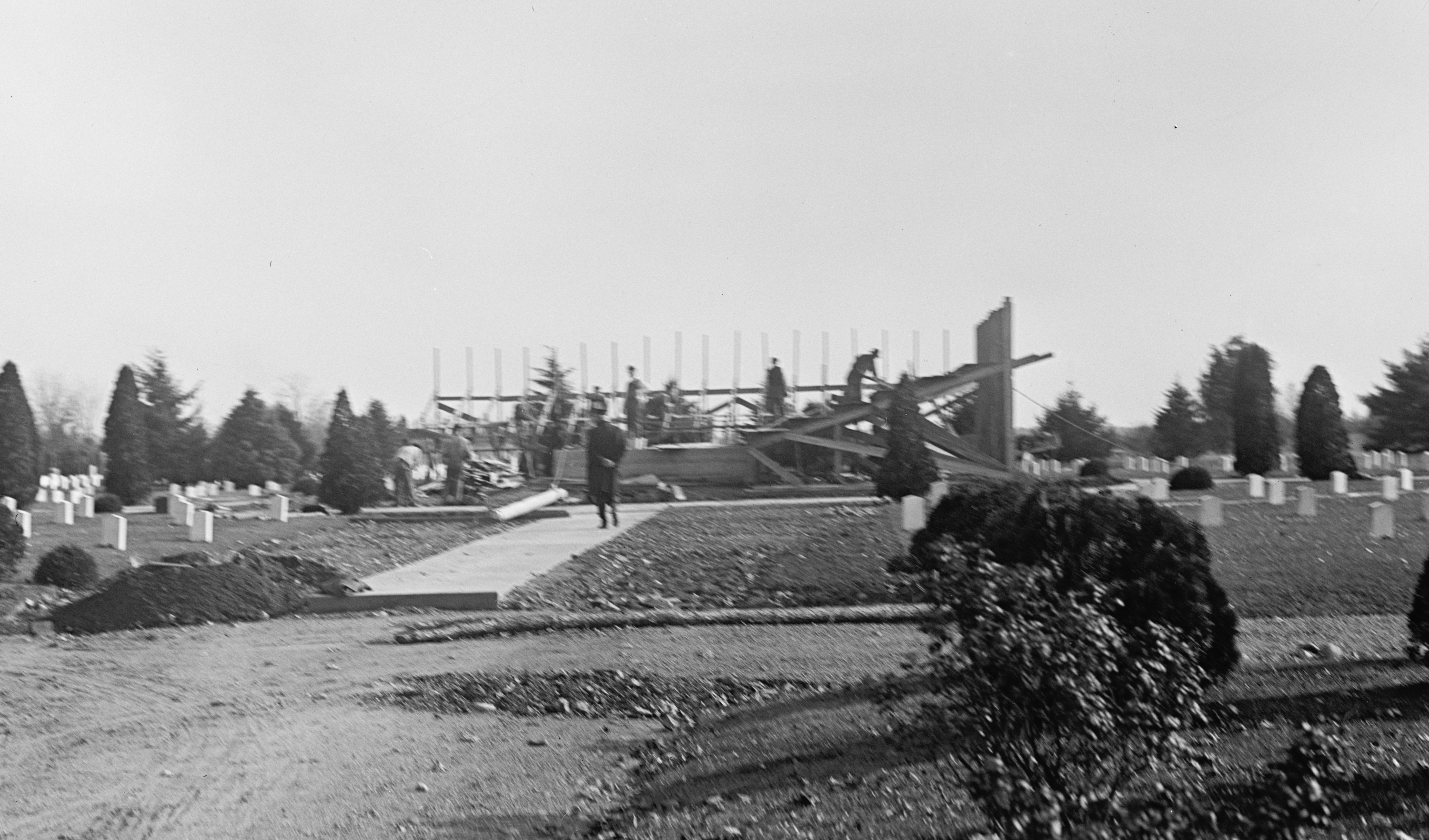
Construction of the foundations for the Confederate Memorial in 1912.

Work on the memorial proceeded on schedule. In June 1912, the ACMA announced that it was planning a dedication to occur 12 months later, just before the Blue-and-Gray reunion at Gettysburg Battlefield in Pennsylvania.

The ACMA set Tuesday, November 12, 1912, at 2:00 pm as the date and time for laying the cornerstone for the memorial. The date coincided with the first day of the UDC's annual convention, which that year was to be held in Washington, D.C. The UDC claimed it was the first time the convention had been held outside the boundary of the old Confederacy (although that was not true, as the convention was held in San Francisco, California, in 1905.) The organization invited President William Howard Taft to speak to the convention, and he agreed to do so in mid-October.

As the date for the cornerstone-laying ceremony approached, more than 10,000 people were expected to attend the event. Plans for the cornerstone ceremony appeared to be disrupted when the 1912 presidential election was held just a week before the event and Taft lost the election to Woodrow Wilson. It was widely expected that Taft would cancel his speech, but Taft reaffirmed his commitment to speak at the cornerstone-laying event. It was considered an important speech, since it was his first speaking engagement since losing the election.

The cornerstone laying occurred as scheduled on November 12. The turnout of about 6,000 people was lighter than expected. The 15th Cavalry Regiment Band provided music for the event, and Bishop Robert Atkinson Gibson of the Episcopal Diocese of Virginia delivered the invocation. Speakers included former presidential candidate William Jennings Bryan and Hilary A. Herbert. On the spur of the moment, Herbert asked Corporal James R. Tanner, former Commander of the Grand Army of the Republic (a veterans organization for Union soldiers) to briefly address the crowd. Tanner lost both legs in the war, became a stenographer, and took eyewitness testimony on behalf of the government in the hours following the assassination of Abraham Lincoln. He had briefly led the Bureau of Pensions in 1889, and helped organize the American Red Cross. There were murmurs of disapproval from the audience when Tanner spoke.

When the speeches ended, the cornerstone was laid. The cornerstone contained a time capsule in which a large number of objects and documents were placed, including a certified copy of the Act of June 6, 1900; the letter from Secretary of War Taft giving the ACMA permission to build the memorial; membership rosters of the UDC and other organizations; flags of the states which joined the Confederacy; and examples of Confederate and modern paper money and coins. (Note: The complete list of items in the cornerstone time capsule included: A certified copy of the Act of June 6, 1900, establishing the Confederate section at Arlington National Cemetery; a history of the creation of the Confederate section, with a list of dead buried therein compiled by Dr. Samuel E. Lewis; a history of the ACMA; a transcript of the minutes of the November 1907 UDC Convention; a roster of the members and officers of the ACMA; the letter from Secretary of War Taft giving the ACMA the authority to build the memorial; a duplicate of "receipt #1" from the ACMA to the Robert E. Lee Chapter No. 644 of the UDC for its $1,000 donation; samples of official stationery of the ACMA; photographs of the models of the memorial, as completed thus far; minutes of the 1911 UDC Convention; a list of all the chapters of the UDC; a list of the camps of the United Confederate Veterans; a membership roster of Camp No. 305, United Sons of Confederate Veterans; a membership roster of the Southern Relief Society of the District of Columbia; the flag of the UDC; the current flag of each state or territory which had a UDC chapter in 1912 (Alabama, Arizona, Arkansas, California, Colorado, D.C., Florida, Illinois, Kentucky, Louisiana, Maryland, Mexico, Mississippi, Missouri, Minnesota, Nebraska, New York, North Carolina, Ohio, Oklahoma, Oregon, Pennsylvania, South Carolina, Tennessee, Texas, Utah, and Virginia); a copy of the Declaration of Independence; a plaster cast of the Seal of the Confederate States; specimens of Confederate money ranging in denomination from 50 cents to $100; a 25-cent shinplaster from South Carolina; a Confederate $10 bill with a poem written on it by "Jonah"; Confederate postage stamps; a Confederate stamp seal for postmarking stamps and letters; small-denomination U.S. coins from 1907 and 1912; a list of the names of the President of the United States and his Cabinet in 1906 and 1912; a copy of the Act of March 9, 1906, providing for the marking of Confederate graves near Union prisons where they died, and the report of the Senate committee which accompanied this legislation; a pamphlet entitled Life of the Youngest Confederate Soldier; copies of The Washington Star, The Washington Post, the Washington Times, and the Washington Herald for November 11, 1912; a copy of William Jennings Bryan's speech, with the text of Proverbs 16:9 in his handwriting on the cover ("A man deviseth his way, but the Lord directeth his steps"); official tickets and badges and the official program for the 1912 UDC Convention; a copy of the official program of the exercises for the laying of the Confederate Memorial cornerstone; and list of articles placed in the cornerstone time capsule. See: Herbert, pp. 32–34.) A ceremonial trowel of mortar was laid beneath the cornerstone by Herbert, Tanner, and Miss Mary Custis Lee, the 77-year-old only living child of Confederate General Robert E. Lee. The cornerstone was then lowered into place. Mrs. Cordelia Powell Odenheimer, the First Vice President of the UDC, then placed mortar atop the stone. (Note: UDC President-General Rassie Haskins White was married to Alexander B. White, a prominent banker in Nashville, Tennessee. She was not present for the ceremony or convention due to her husband's sudden and severe illness. Alexander B. White died from that undisclosed illness on December 22, 1912. See: "Host to the U.D.C". The Washington Post. November 12, 1912; Herbert, p. 26; "Alexander B. White, Prominent Banker, Dead." Macon Telegraph. December 23, 1912.) The Rev. Dr. Randolph McKim delivered the benediction.

After the ceremony ended, members of the UDC planted a redwood tree near the monument. It was named "Robert E. Lee" in honor of General Lee. The total cost of the event was $594 ($19,817 in 2025 dollars).

=== Dedication delays ===
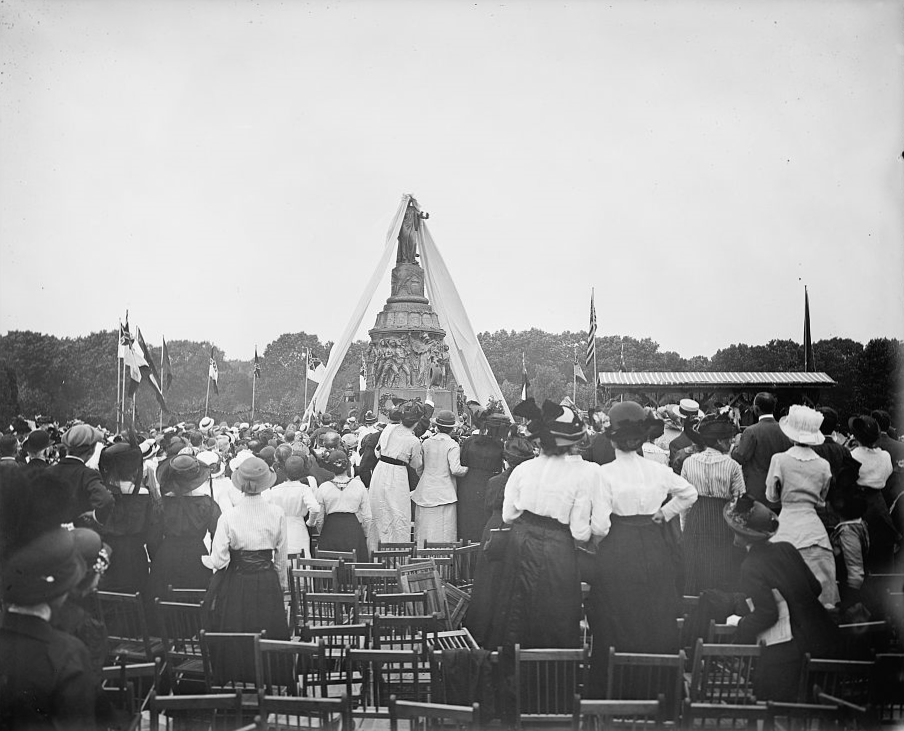
Unveiling of the Confederate Monument on June 4, 1914.

While work on the monument initially progressed on schedule, delays began to occur. Funding was not the issue: By November 1913, the ACMA had paid $20,000 to Ezekiel to secure raw bronze, and almost $22,725 remained in the organization's coffers to complete the memorial, ship it to America, and assemble and erect it. The first delay was small but significant, and occurred in early 1913 when Ezekiel could not obtain copies of the Confederate state shields in a timely fashion. This forced the ACMA and UDC to give up on a June 1913 dedication, and November 5 was informally set as the new date for the event.

Yet more delays occurred. About July, Ezekiel said he needed 10 more days to complete casting, and the UDC changed the dedication date to November 15. But on August 19, an accident occurred in the casting process which delayed delivery of the memorial by yet another three months. The Confederate Memorial was finally complete in November 1913, and shipped to the United States via a Hamburg America ocean liner in early 1914. It was sent by barge up Potomac River and arrived at the Washington Navy Yard on January 10, 1914.

The Confederate Memorial consisted of a number of pieces which required assembly. Civil engineer A. C. Weeks donated his services to help prepare the site for the monument, and oversaw the memorial's erection. The memorial was stored in crates not at the Navy Yard but at the Army Quartermaster's headquarters at Fort Myer, next to Arlington National Cemetery. The ACMA decided to uncrate and erect the memorial in early March 1914 (as soon as winter weather permitted), and established a new the dedication ceremony date for April 27.

But construction problems again forced a delay in the dedication ceremony. With the assistance of Representative James Luther Slayden of San Antonio, Texas, the ACMA had contracted with a Texas firm to provide the granite for the memorial's base. But the company could not furnish enough granite in time to meet the April 27 dedication deadline. The ACMA canceled its contract, and commissioned a Maryland firm to provide the granite instead. The Maryland company said the base would be completed by May 22, so the ACMA rescheduled the dedication for Confederate Memorial Day, June 4.

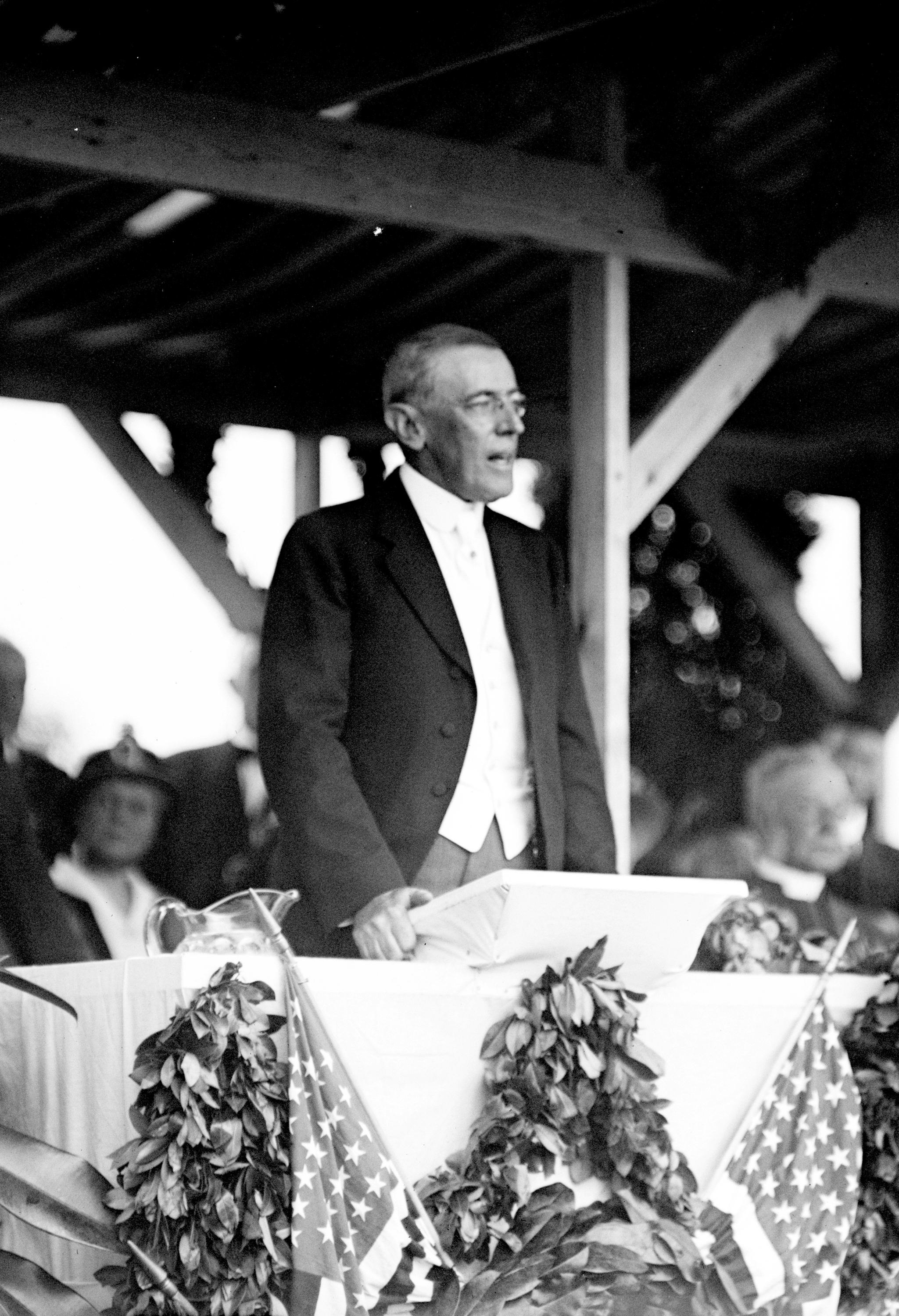
President Wilson speaks at the dedication ceremony for the Confederate Memorial.

Dedication of the Confederate Memorial was the most prominent project the UDC had ever undertaken, and the organization desired to make it a special occasion. Florence Butler (wife of former North Carolina Senator Marion Butler) chaired the dedication program committee. She called it a "disagreeable job", for it involved declining hundreds of requests from people who wanted to read speeches, sing or play songs, and recite poetry. Butler, however, was convinced that there should be a bare minimum of speeches, and none of them should be lengthy. President Woodrow Wilson, a native Virginian, was invited to be the keynote speaker, and an invitation he readily accepted. His participation was almost derailed, however, when Wilson decided against attending the Grand Army of the Republic's Memorial Day ceremonies. An outraged GAR demanded that Wilson withdraw from the Confederate Memorial dedication. But Wilson quickly agreed to attend the GAR's event, and the scandal died down.

=== Dedicating the memorial ===
The dedication ceremony for the Confederate Memorial was held on June 4, 1914. Although numerous dignitaries and Confederate groups were invited to attend, only a single Union veterans' group was asked to do so (because, the UDC said, there was limited seating). The Union veterans' group which was invited was the 23rd New Jersey Regiment, which made a major donation early in the fund-raising process. But its leaders could not be reached and no representative from the unit attended.

The ceremony began with music from the 5th Cavalry Regiment Band, which entertained the more than 4,000 people who attended the ceremony, including all members of Congress. The invocation was delivered by the Rev. Dr. Randolph H. McKim, pastor of the Church of the Epiphany (a historic Episcopal church located at 1317 G Street NW). Hilary Herbert acted as the master of ceremonies. Former Confederate general Bennett H. Young, National Commander of the United Confederate Veterans, spoke first, followed by Washington Gardner, a former sergeant with the 65th Ohio Volunteer Infantry and National Commander of the Grand Army of the Republic. Colonel Robert Edward Lee III (USA), grandson of General Robert E. Lee, then addressed the audience on the meaning of the memorial. Herbert spoke briefly and then, on behalf of the ACMA, turned the memorial over to the UDC. Daisy McLaurin Stevens, President of the UDC, accepted the memorial and delivered her own a brief oration.

Following the speakers, the Confederate Memorial was unveiled by 11-year-old Paul Herbert Micou, grandson of Hilary Herbert. A 21-gun artillery salute followed, and then Mrs. Stevens presented the memorial to President Wilson as a gift to the American people.

The dedication program was to have concluded with a major address by President Wilson followed by mass singing, wreath-laying and other floral tributes, a benediction by Reverend Andrew R. Bird of the Church of the Pilgrims (a Presbyterian church located in Washington, D.C.), and a wreath-laying at the Civil War Unknowns Monument. But a thunderstorm broke over the crowd as the President neared the end of his remarks. With no marquee or other shelter nearby for the crowd, most attendees rushed for their automobiles and returned to the city. The President left as well, and the dedication ceremony ended abruptly. The floral tributes were quickly deposited at the foot of the memorial, and the wreath hurriedly placed at the Civil War Unknowns memorial. The cost of the ceremony was $2,660 ($85,510 in 2025 dollars).

== About the memorial ==
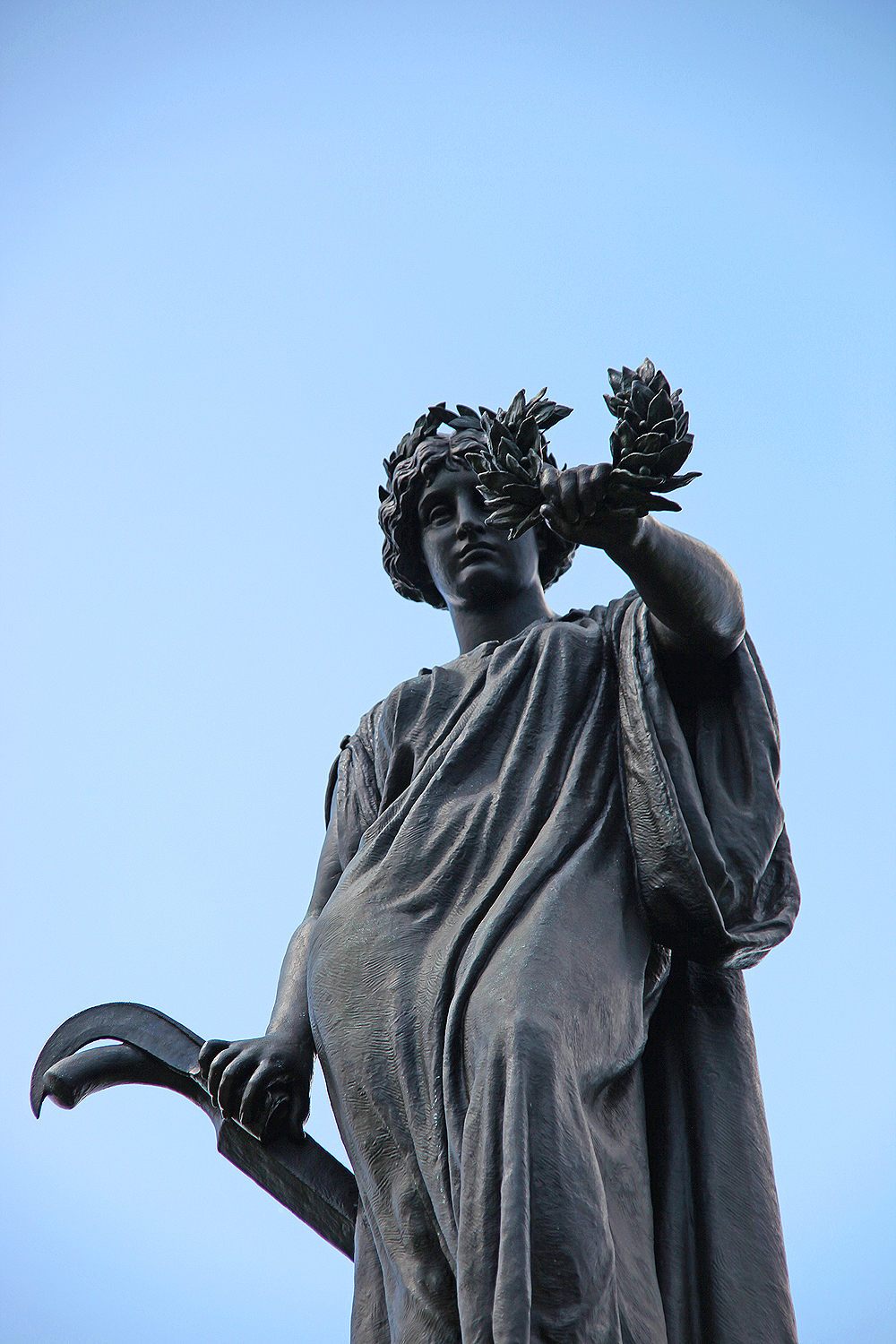
Figure representing "The South" atop the memorial.

The Confederate Memorial stood in a circular grassy area in the center of Stonewall Jackson Circle in Section 16 in Arlington National Cemetery in Arlington County, Virginia. Section 16 is completely surrounded by Section 17, and Jackson Circle may be reached via a short path connecting the circle to McPherson Drive. Sculpted in the Baroque style by Moses Ezekiel in his Rome, Italy, studio, the cost of the bronze and casting was about $41,770 ($1,342,639) (although the press reported the number as $35,000 [$1,125,000 in 2025 dollars]). Ezekiel donated his services as sculptor. The memorial was cast by Aktien-Gesellschaft Gladenbeck in Berlin, Germany. The cost of shipping the statue to the United States and erecting it at Arlington National Cemetery was $8,229 ($264,504 in 2025 dollars) (although the press reported it as $15,000 [$482,143 in 2025 dollars]).

The memorial consisted of a bronze statue atop a bronze plinth, which stands on a granite base which rests on concrete footings. The base consists of a rectangular lower base and a taller upper base in the shape of a nearly-square Maltese cross, which together are about 3 feet (0.91 m) high. The two elements which make up the base are of polished Woodstock granite from Maryland, while the plinth above the base is made of bronze. Prior to laying the foundations, the entire Confederation section was regraded. Roads through the section, built in 1901–1903, were closed and removed and replaced with turf. The road around the site was converted to a cement walk and gutters installed. The cost of these alterations, borne by the UDC, was $1,020 ($34,029 in 2025 dollars).

The statue is generally referred to as the "Confederate Memorial" and sometimes as the "Confederate Monument” (Note: Arlington National Cemetery refers to the work as the "Confederate Memorial", which is the term used in this article. See: "Confederate Memorial." Monuments and Memorials. Exploring the Cemetery. Visitor Information. Arlington National Cemetery, no date, accessed 2013-06-23.) (Note: The National Park Service distinguishes between a memorial and a monument: "A monument is a structure built for commemorative or symbolic reasons. President's Park has several monuments such as First Division Monument and Zero Milestone Monument. ... What is a memorial? A structure erected to commemorate persons or events." See: "President's Park (White House)." President's Park. National Park Service. U.S. Department of the Interior. October 22, 2013, accessed 2013-11-02. Technically, "Confederate Monument" is incorrect.) or the “Reconciliation Memorial". It has no official name, although Moses Ezekiel preferred the title "New South". The memorial is richly decorated, and reflects Ezekiel's training in Germany as well as the ornate Romantic style of Victorian decorative arts.

At 32 feet (9.8 m) in height, the Confederate Memorial is among the tallest of the memorials and monuments at Arlington National Cemetery. It is often said to be the tallest, but the obelisk over the grave of Major General Joseph Wheeler is taller (45 feet (14 m)).

=== Figure of "The South" ===
The topmost portion of the memorial consists of a larger-than-life figure of a woman representing the South. The orientation of the figure and its face is toward the south, in part to honor the Confederacy but also so that the sun may shine on the face of the figure at all times (which is symbolic of being favored). The figure's head is crowned with an olive wreath, which is both sacred to Minerva (Roman goddess of war and wisdom) and a symbol of peace. The figure's left hand extends a laurel wreath toward the south in acknowledgment of the sacrifices made by the South's men in arms and as a symbol of the past. The figure holds a pruning hook in its right hand, which in turn rests on a plow. This represents peace and reconciliation as well as the hope that the labor of the South will lead to new glory.

The figure stood on a round pedestal decorated with palm branches and four cinerary urns. Low relief numbers on the urns refer to the four years of the American Civil War (1861, 1862, 1863, and "1864–65"). Beneath the round pedestal is a round plinth in the form of a wreath of wheat. Below the plinth is a round base on which is inscribed: "AND THEY SHALL BEAT THEIR SWORDS INTO PLOUGHSHARES AND THEIR SPEARS INTO PRUNING HOOKS." It is a partial quotation from Isaiah 2:4.

Below the base is a frieze of 14 inwardly inclined shields, each of which depicts the coat of arms of one of the 11 Confederate states, as well as the border states of Missouri, Kentucky, and Maryland.

=== 32 figures on the mount ===
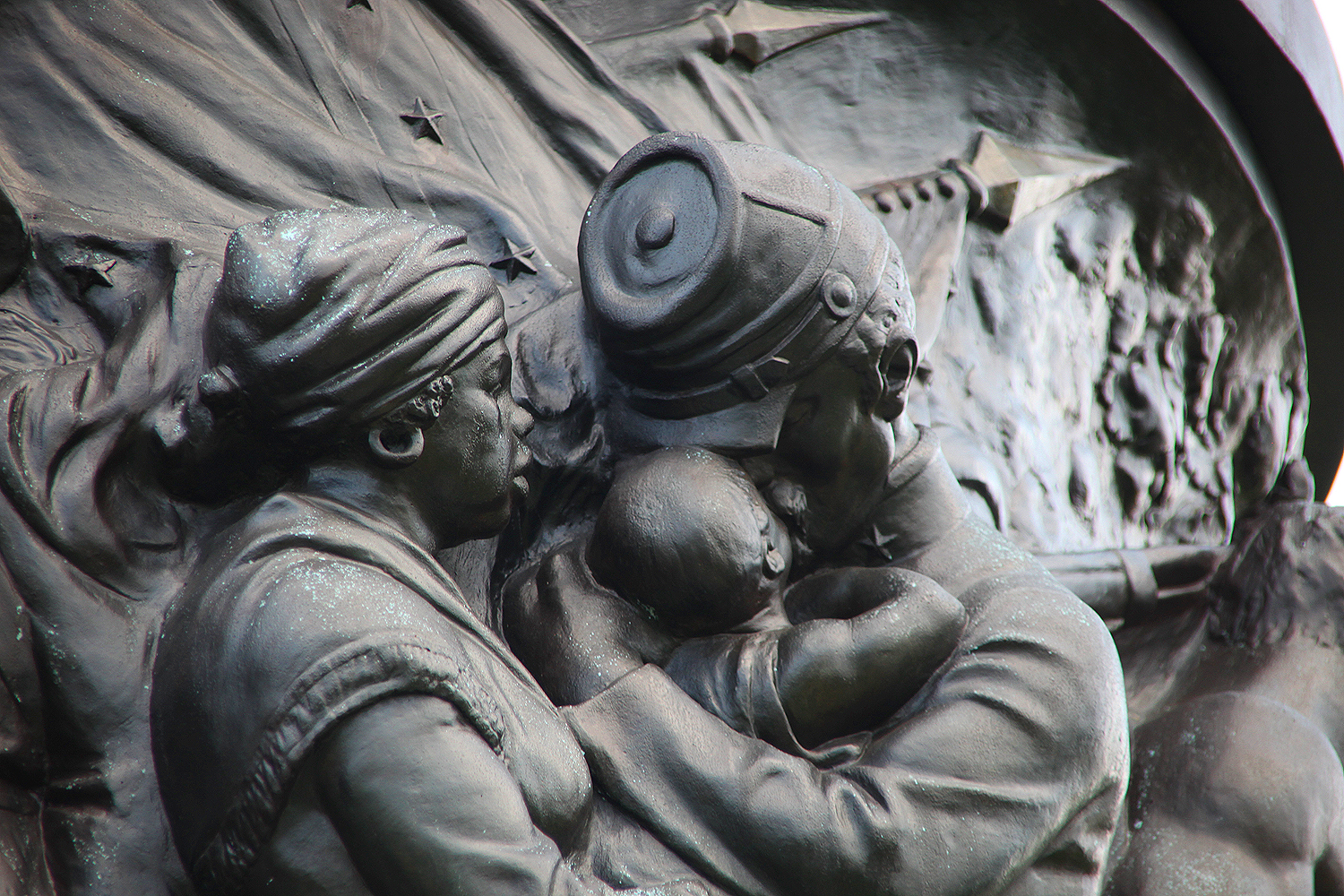
Sculptor Moses Ezekiel included the weeping figure of the loyal black mammy as a correction to what he and the UDC saw as lies about history perpetrated by the North.

Below the frieze is a cylindrical mount on which are 32 life-size figures. In the front (or south-facing side) of the mount is the panoplied figure of Minerva. Minerva attempts to support the figure of a fallen woman (who also represents the South). The woman is leaning against a shield emblazoned with the words "The Constitution." Behind Minerva's head, allegorical "Spirits of War" trumpet in every direction, calling the citizens of the South to aid their country. One spirit resembles a gorgon, while another holds a cinerary urn. (Note: Jacob identifies the snake-haired spirit as Tisiphone, one if the Erinyes or Furies. See: Jacob, p. 168.) On either side of the fallen woman are figures depicting those who came to the South's aid. They represent each branch of the Confederate armed forces: miner, sailor, sapper, and soldier. There are four figures (two in high relief, two in low relief) facing Minerva on the southwest corner of the mount. There are six figures (three in high relief, three in low relief) facing Minerva on the southeast corner of the mount. A uniformed black slave, following his master to war, is depicted among the six figures on the southeast. The slave is not a soldier, although the image is often referred to as a "black soldier". It is, as the UDC pointed out in 1914, "a faithful Negro body-servant following his young master". This particular image was inspired by Thomas Nelson Page's 1887 Lost Cause story, Marse Chan: A Tale of Old Virginia.

On the east, northeast, north, northwest, and west sides of the cylindrical mount are the remainder of the figures in high relief. These figures are intended to represent the sacrifices, devotion, and heroism of all social classes of people in the Confederacy. The figures depict:

- A military officer kissing his infant child, who is held in the arms of a weeping black mammy while another child clings to her skirts;
- A shirtless blacksmith leaving his anvil and tools behind as his sorrowful wife looks on;
- A clergyman and his grieving wife saying goodbye to their teenage son (who has enlisted); and
- A young lady binding a sword and sash onto her beau.

The inclusion of the "faithful black servants" was purposeful. Sculptor Moses Ezekiel included them because he wanted to undermine what he called the "lies" told about the South and slavery in Harriet Beecher Stowe's 1852 novel Uncle Tom's Cabin and wished to rewrite history "correctly" (his word) to depict black slaves' support for the Confederate cause.

An oak tree spreads its branches behind the couple and their son and the blacksmith's family. It represents the support family lends to the Confederate cause, as well as the strength of Confederate families.

=== Base ===
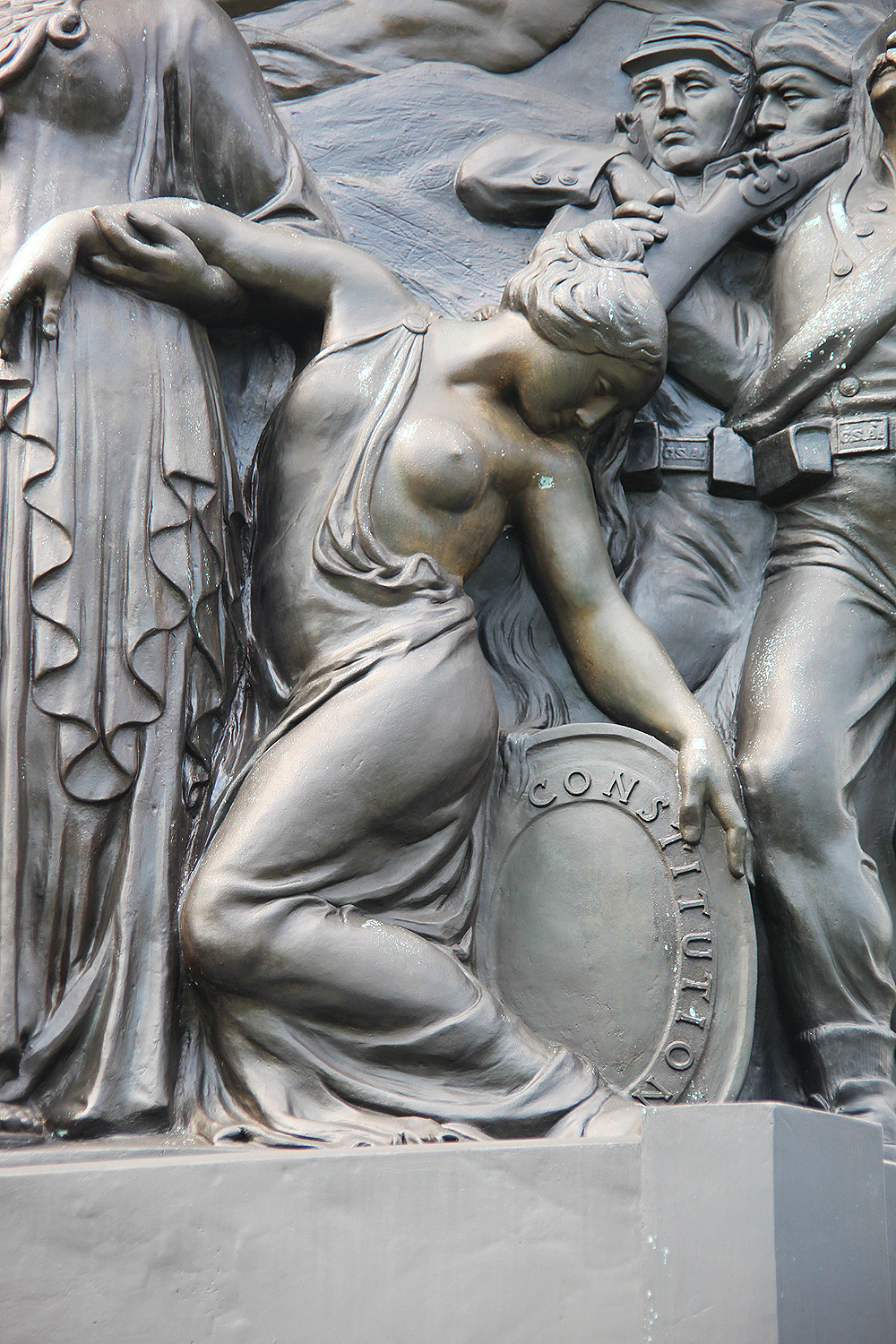
The fallen figure of a woman, also representing "The South", leans on a shield emblazoned with the words "The Constitution" as a symbol of what the UDC believed the South fought for.

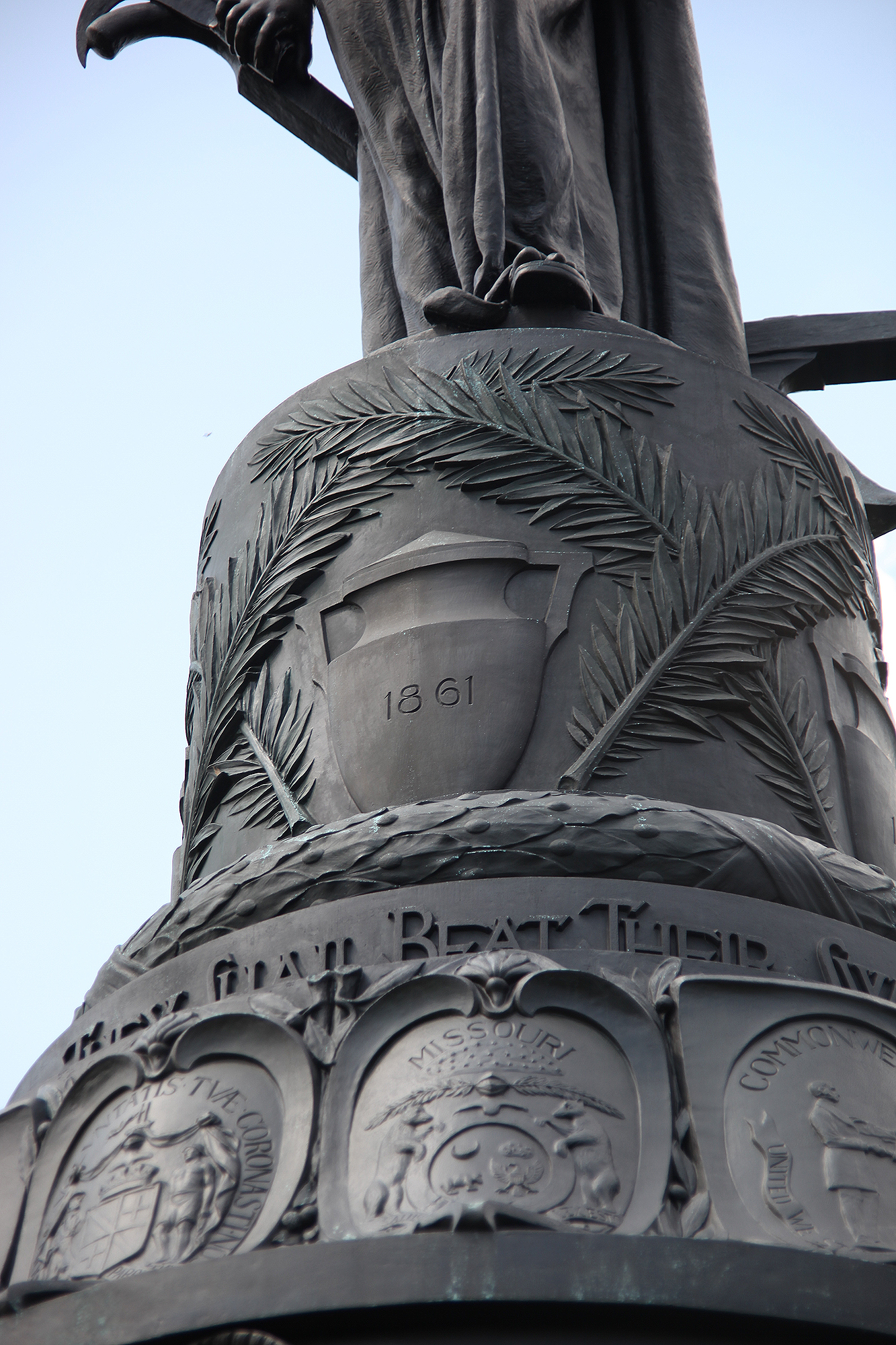
Cinerary urns and shields bearing the coat of arms of each state support the topmost figure on the memorial.

The 32 life-size figures stand on an irregular octagonal base. The front (or south-facing side) of this base depicts the Great Seal of the Confederacy in low relief. In raised letters below the seal are the following words:

TO OUR DEAD HEROES
BY
THE UNITED DAUGHTERS
OF THE CONFEDERACY
VICTRIX CAUSA DIIS
PLACUIT SED VICTA CATONI

This Latin phrase means: "The Victorious Cause was Pleasing to the Gods, But the Lost Cause Pleased Cato." It is a quotation from the poem Pharsalia by the ancient Roman poet Lucan. It refers to the attempt by the Roman Senator Pompey to prevent Julius Caesar from becoming dictator of Rome in 49 BC. Although he lost, Pompey's actions pleased the great philosopher and statesman Cato (who was noted for his moral integrity).

On the north face of the memorial in raised letters are the following words:

NOT FOR FAME OR REWARD
NOT FOR PLACE OR FOR RANK
NOT LURED BY AMBITION
OR GOADED BY NECESSITY
BUT IN SIMPLE
OBEDIENCE TO DUTY
AS THEY UNDERSTOOD IT
THESE MEN SUFFERED ALL
SACRIFICED ALL
DARED ALL — AND DIED

RANDOLPH HARRISON MCKIM

On the northwest face of the octagonal base, in raised letters, are the words:

M. Ezekiel * Sculptor
Rome MCMXII

On the northeast face of the octagonal base, in raised letters, are the words:

MADE BY
AKTIEN-GESELLSCHAFT GLADENBECK
BRONZE FOUNDERY
BERLIN-FRIEDRICHSHAGEN-GERMANY

The east and west sides of the octagonal base are flanked by pedestals, on top of which are urn-like lamps topped with "eternal flames" of bronze.

=== Reception ===
In 1914, The Washington Post lauded the memorial when it was unveiled. It was effusive in its praise for the monument's focus on peace and the future, its emphasis on the South's fight for constitutional rights and not slavery, and its repetitive images focusing on the sacrifices made by the heroic common soldier. Unnamed European art critics cited by The Sunday Star newspaper said it was "a marvel of facial expression and allegorically perfect". Colonel William Couper, a faculty member at the Virginia Military Institute (VMI), praised it in 1933 as "magnificent and impressive".

Modern critics have been somewhat more equivocal. Keith Gibson, executive director of the VMI museum system, says the Confederate Memorial is a "superb example of Ezekiel's style and imagery", and one of the artist's most significant works. Gibson nevertheless faults the memorial for its static posing and "hard contours". Historian Katherine Allamong Jacob, however, notes that while the memorial is "intensely dramatic" it is also "not a little sentimental". In 2007, The Washington Post reporter Linda Wheeler found the memorial ornate and romantic and praised it as a vivid reflection of Victorian artistic taste. Kirk Savage, associate professor of art history and architecture at the University of Pittsburgh, criticizes the memorial for being "clearly the product of white supremacist thinking and practice". Historian Erika Lee Doss agrees, calling it "a pro-southern textbook illustrated in bronze".

In 2020, Arlington National Cemetery installed a plaque near the statue, informing visitors that the memorial features "highly sanitized depictions of slavery". The contextualizing language on the sign and website were removed in 2026.

== History of the memorial ==
In August 1915, Secretary of War Lindley Miller Garrison determined that the Confederate Monument should be cared for by the federal government under the authority granted by the Act of June 8, 1906.

As of November 2013, the Confederate Memorial remains one of three sites at Arlington National Cemetery mentioned by name in the Code of Federal Regulations where public memorial services may be conducted. (The others are the Memorial Amphitheater and the John F. Kennedy Grave.)

=== Final financial issues ===
A total of $56,262 ($1,808,421 in 2025 dollars) was raised by the UDC for the memorial by November 1914. But the $40,000 ($1,285,714 in 2025 dollars) budgeted for design and casting of the monument fell short of the actual cost. Ezekiel was forced to spend about $5,000 ($160,714 in 2025 dollars) of his own funds casting the piece, as the money paid to him barely covered the cost of materials.

Many UDC leaders felt fundraising should continue since the Little Rock convention of 1910 had implicitly promised to pay Ezekiel more money. The resolution which enlarged the memorial and increased the amount of money budgeted for it read: "...that the monument in Washington shall cost not less than $50,000, with the hopes of $75,000, and that a contract be made to this effect...". Although Ezekiel declined to press the issue, UDC leaders felt morally bound to try to pay him the additional $25,000 ($803,571 in 2025 dollars). In November 1914, with nearly all the costs of the memorial, its erection, and dedication paid, there remained a memorial fund balance of $1,771 ($56,925 in 2025 dollars). This money was paid to Ezekiel. At the Savannah convention of 1914, the delegates agreed to pay Ezekiel a total of $8,229 ($264,504 in 2025 dollars) above the $40,000 already sent to him. (Note: This figure included the $1,771 already paid to Ezekiel, plus another $6,459—the sum expended on shipping, site preparation, construction of the foundation, construction of the base, and erection of the statue. It is unclear why the delegates felt Ezekiel should receive $6,459, as he had not paid for these items.) Savannah convention raised just $1,504 toward this sum, and the UDC general treasury donated another $1,000 from its treasury. Moses Ezekiel died in March 1917, and it is unclear whether the UDC ever paid the outstanding $3,955 ($127,133 in 2025 dollars).

At the November 1917 UDC convention in Chattanooga, Tennessee, the ACMA treasurer reported that the Confederate Memorial fund now showed a deficit of $1,325 ($33,297 in 2025 dollars). There is no indication in the UDC convention minutes as to why this deficit was incurred. The organization's treasurer proposed that the necessary funds be raised by donations at the convention and that any remaining deficit paid for by the UDC out of its treasury.

=== Burials at the memorial ===
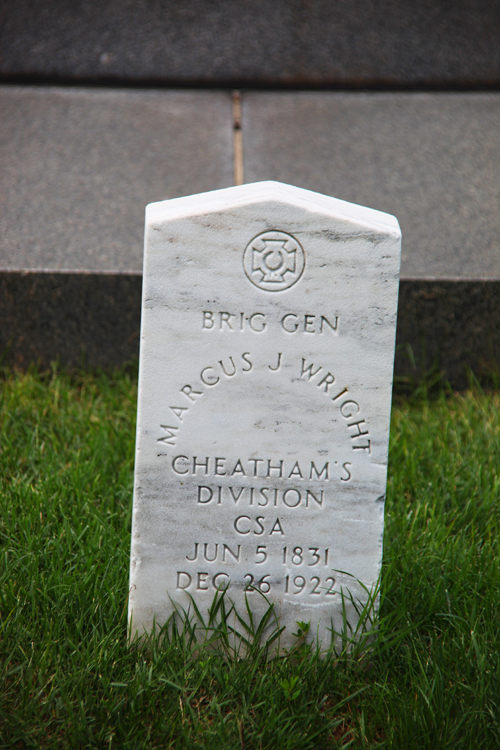
Grave of Brig. Gen. Marcus J. Wright on the south side of the memorial.

Burials in the Confederate section continued after the Confederate Memorial was completed. The first of these was Thomas Findley, who was buried on June 11, 1914, just days after the dedication ceremony. His interment, however, proved controversial because the War Department gave him full military honors. This created widespread anger nationally among GAR members because Findley was not honorably discharged from the armed forces of the United States, as required by law.

Four notable burials occurred at the compass points of the Confederate Memorial, and stand out from the rest of the graves nearby for not being part of the concentric circles of burials. These are the graves of Moses Ezekiel, Lieutenant Harry C. Marmaduke, Captain John M. Hickey, and Brigadier General Marcus J. Wright. The first of these burials was that of Moses Ezekiel, which occurred on March 30, 1921. Ezekiel died in Italy on March 27, 1917. He requested that his body be brought back to the United States for burial, but this was not possible as World War I prevented it. His body was returned to America after the war and a funeral held in Arlington Memorial Amphitheater on March 30, 1921—the first funeral ever to be held in the year-old structure. His body was buried on the east side of the memorial, and a small granite pedestal surmounted by a bronze plaque placed at the head of the grave.

The second of the four notable burials was that of Brigadier General Wright, which occurred on December 29, 1922. He was interred on the south side of the memorial. The third burial was that of Captain Henry H. Marmaduke, the last known surviving officer of the ironclad warship CSS Virginia (which famously fought the USS Monitor in the Battle of Hampton Roads on March 9, 1862). A midshipman at the time of the battle, he lived in the District of Columbia after 1883 and was buried on the west side of the memorial on November 17, 1924. The last notable burial was that of Captain John M. Hickey, who was buried on the memorial's north side on October 3, 1927.

It is unclear why these four were buried next to the memorial and not elsewhere in the Confederate section. Ezekiel, Wright, and Hickey all played major roles in creating the Confederate section and bringing the memorial into being, but it is less clear why Marmaduke warranted burial at the foot of the memorial (although his notable war service may have justified it). Also unclear is why no other notable burials occurred next to the memorial.

=== Other history of the memorial ===
The Confederate Memorial was the focus of Confederate Memorial Day exercises in the Washington, D.C., area. President Woodrow Wilson attended the first four events (1915, 1916, 1917, and 1918) held at the memorial, although he spoke only at that of 1917. (Note: It is unclear if Wilson was to speak at the 1915 event, as it was rained out. He attended but did not speak at the other three events. Wilson's presence in 1919, 1920, and 1921 was excused by the press of business due to World War I. See: "Unveil Southern Cross". The Washington Post. June 14, 1915; "Honor South's Valor". The Washington Post. June 5, 1916; "Dixie's War Spirit Ablaze for Country". The Washington Post. June 4, 1917; "Honor South's Heroes". The Washington Post. June 10, 1918; "South's Memorial Day at Arlington". The Washington Post. June 8, 1919; "Hundreds Extol South's Warriors". The Washington Post. June 7, 1920; "'Southern Cross' Unveiled at Arlington". The Washington Post. June 6, 1921.) It is unclear when Wilson began sending wreaths to the event, although historians agree the tradition began with Wilson. President Warren G. Harding spoke at the first Confederate Memorial Day event of his presidency in 1922, but did not attend in 1923. Harding's successor, Calvin Coolidge, spoke at the memorial on Confederate Memorial Day in 1924 (held that year on May 25). Coolidge sent a wreath beginning with the 1925 Confederate Memorial Day, but never again attended the event. President Herbert Hoover never attended the event.

Attendance at the Confederate Memorial Day event at the memorial has fluctuated wildly. For example, more than 2,000 attended Confederate Memorial Day ceremonies at the memorial in 1912, but just 600 did so in 1925 (the 60th anniversary of the end of the war). "Several hundred" attended the 1931 event, while more than 2,000 came in 1932. A thousand were there in 1934. Although media coverage of the event was sparse in the 1930s, more than a thousand people attended the 1942 ceremony. Just 500 attended in 1946, 400 in 1948, and 200 in 1951. About 150 people attended the 2007 event.

Graves in the Confederate section received new headstones in 1930.

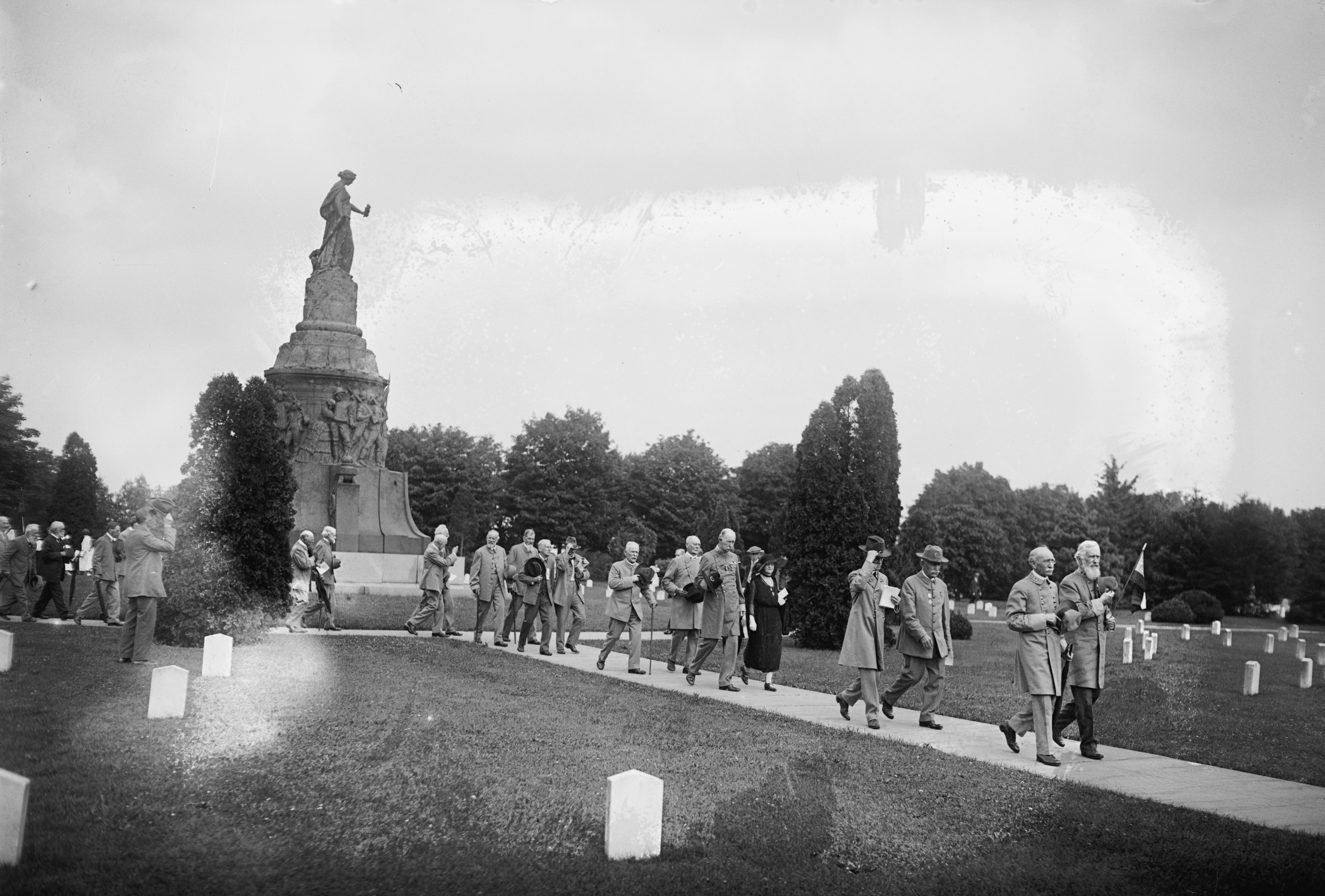
Conclusion of the Confederate Memorial Day exercises in 1922. Note the much different landscaping around the memorial compared to photos from the 2000s, the still-extant sidewalks, and the far fewer graves.

Another set of memorials was proposed for the Confederate section in 1931. The idea was sparked by a controversy over the burial of LaSalle Corbell Pickett, wife of Major General George Pickett (CSA). Pickett died in Norfolk, Virginia, on July 30, 1875. After a brief interment in a cemetery in Norfolk, his remains were reburied in the Confederate military section of Hollywood Cemetery in Richmond, Virginia, on October 24, 1875. LaSalle Corbell Pickett died on March 22, 1931. Her wish was to be buried next to her husband, but Hollywood Cemetery officials refused, citing regulations that only men could be buried in the Confederate section of Hollywood Cemetery. Mrs. Pickett's grandson and eldest surviving male descendant, Lieutenant George E. Pickett III, was outraged by the cemetery's decision. He sought to have his grandmother buried in the Confederate section of Arlington National Cemetery, and have his grandfather's remains disinterred and brought to D.C. for burial beside her. Lieutenant Pickett then conferred with representatives of the War Department and Colonel Robert Lee Longstreet, son of Lieutenant General James Longstreet. The three parties devised a plan to erect statues to Generals Pickett, Longstreet, and Robert E. Lee in the Confederate section. The three statues would be grouped together where Jackson Circle and McPherson Drive met, creating what Pickett and Longstreet called a "tri-hero corner". Additionally, Longstreet conceived of a site adjacent to the Confederate section where Confederates could be buried or reburied, and additional memorials to them erected. He brought his idea to War Department shortly after the tri-hero corner concept was broached. Alarmed not only at the loss of Pickett's remains but at a potential shift in focus from Richmond to Arlington, Hollywood Cemetery officials quickly agreed to inter Mrs. Pickett next to her husband. With this decision, the rationale for a tri-hero corner largely went away, and neither it nor Longstreet's memorial section plan were implemented.

There were also attempts to erect additional Confederate memorials at Arlington National Cemetery in the 1930s. The first of these was a legislative proposal by Representative Hamilton Fish III in 1935 to erect a statue of Robert E. Lee somewhere in the cemetery. The UDC had previously sought to erect a statue of Lee near Arlington House about 1900, but abandoned this plan to pursue the Confederate Memorial. The UDC strongly backed the Fish bill, but the legislation generated widespread opposition and died in Congress in 1936 without being acted on. A second Confederate memorial was proposed for Arlington Memorial Amphitheater. It is unclear who or what group made the suggestion (although The Washington Post implied it was a project of the Sons of Confederate Veterans), but it was proposed to inscribe the names of leading Confederate figures on the columns on either side of the apse in Memorial Amphitheater. These square pilasters on either side of the apse list the names of famous American generals (left, as one faces the stage) and admirals (right) from the American Revolutionary War through the Spanish–American War of 1898. When the UDC learned of the proposal, many of its members wanted to add the names of Robert E. Lee and Thomas J. "Stonewall" Jackson to the columns as well. A resolution to this effect was offered at the UDC convention in 1937. However, delegates amended the resolution on the floor to deny UDC support for the changes unless the name of Confederate President Jefferson Davis was added as well. The resolution was then adopted. But only Congress had the authority to change the pilasters, and no legislation to add names was ever introduced.

Confederate Memorial Day ceremonies moved to Arlington Memorial Amphitheater from the Confederate Memorial in 1936. Although wreath layings and other brief ceremonies were still conducted at the base of the memorial, most of the event was held in the amphitheater. The ceremonies from the amphitheater (but not the memorial) were first broadcast on radio by NBC in 1937. The ceremonies moved back to the Confederate Memorial in 1941, but returned to the amphitheater in 1942. More recent ceremonies in the 1990s and 2000s have been at the Confederate Memorial, although it is unclear when the event moved out of Memorial Amphitheater. Former Secretary of the Navy Jim Webb spoke at a Confederate Memorial Day exercise at the memorial on June 3, 1990.

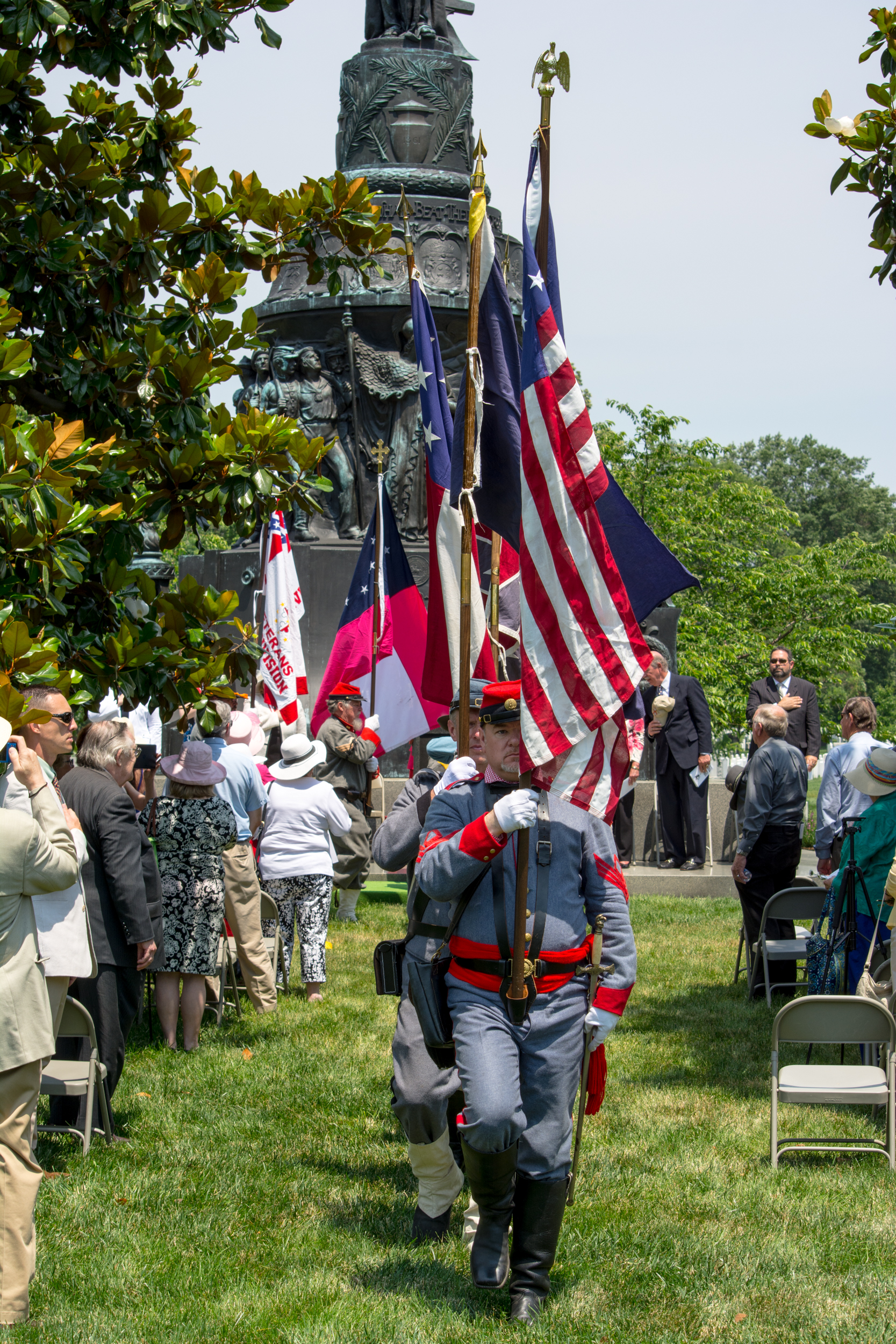
A color guard provided by the Maryland Division of the Sons of Confederate Veterans retires the colors on June 8, 2014, during Confederate Memorial Day exercises commemorating the 100th anniversary of the memorial's dedication.

The 100th anniversary of the dedication of the Confederate Memorial was noted with a ceremony on Confederate Memorial Day hosted by the United Daughters of the Confederacy on June 8, 2014.

=== Presidential wreaths ===
Beginning with Woodrow Wilson in 1919, almost every President of the United States sent a wreath to the Confederate Memorial Day exercises. This tradition was broken by President Harry S. Truman in 1949 and again in 1950. Truman resumed the tradition in 1951, and a presidential wreath continued to be donated each year for the next four decades. In 1990, President George H. W. Bush declined to send a wreath to the ceremony, citing infighting among Confederate groups. Bush declined to send a wreath again in 1991 and 1992. President Bill Clinton resumed the tradition in 1993, and it was continued by his successor, President George W. Bush.

When African-American Senator Barack Obama was elected President in November 2008, he faced a dilemma about continuing the tradition. As Kirk Savage, art historian, put it, "a black president suddenly became in charge of a tradition steeped in white supremacy". In 2009, several dozen university professors and historians asked President Obama to end the tradition, and the issue received some mass media attention. Confederate heritage groups denounced any attempt to end the presidential wreath tradition, arguing it would be an insult to Southerners. A few days before the 2009 Confederate Memorial Day, Savage argued in a The Washington Post editorial that the Southerners were essentially correct. He concluded that to end the tradition would only reinforce racist attitudes in America and do little to promote an understanding of the role of slavery in American history and society. President Obama himself never addressed the issue. Instead, Obama sent a wreath not only to the Confederate Memorial but also instituted a new tradition of sending a presidential wreath to the African American Civil War Memorial in Washington, D.C.

=== Position of Moses Jacob Ezekiel's descendants ===
In 2017, after the violence at the Unite the Right rally in Charlottesville, Virginia, gave additional impetus to the removal of Confederate monuments and memorials, a number of descendants of the monument's sculptor Moses Jacob Ezekiel wrote a letter to The Washington Post calling for the monument to be removed:

Like most such monuments, this statue intended to rewrite history to justify the Confederacy and the subsequent racist Jim Crow laws. It glorifies the fight to own human beings, and, in its portrayal of African Americans, implies their collusion. As proud as our family may be of Moses's artistic prowess, we—some twenty Ezekiels—say remove that statue. Take it out of its honored spot in Arlington National Cemetery and put it in a museum that makes clear its oppressive history.

=== Removal ===
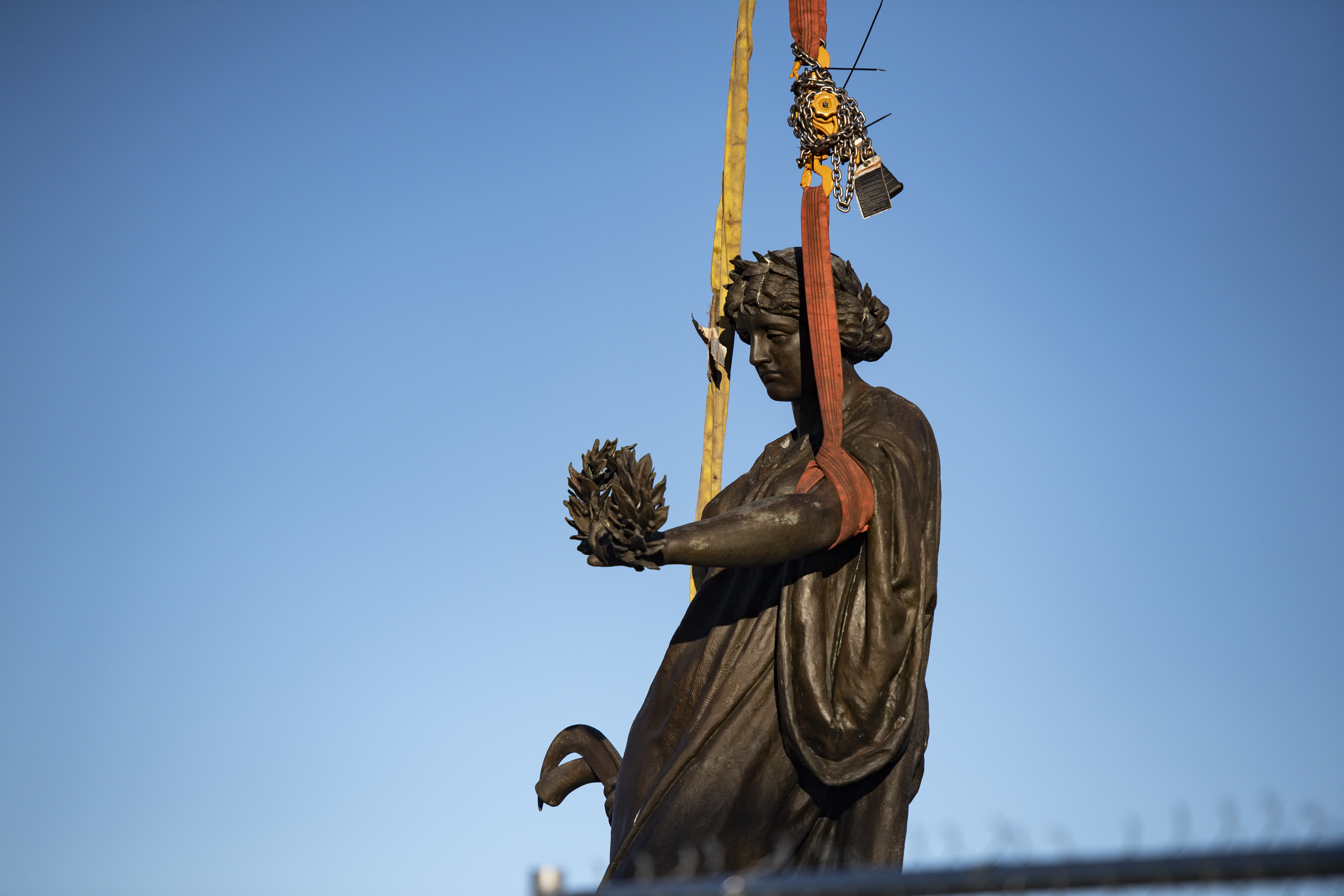
The monument was removed from Section 16 of Arlington National Cemetery on December 20, 2023. It will be relocated at the New Market Battlefield State Historical Park.

In 2021, Congress established the Naming Commission in response to the George Floyd protests. The Commission set out to examine the ways in which the military continued to honor the Confederacy and provided recommendations on removing and renaming all Department of Defense items "that commemorate the Confederate States of America or any person who served voluntarily with the Confederate States of America." One of the suggestions was to remove the Confederate Memorial at Arlington, even though it memorialized the deaths of those who served involuntarily and Congress had expressly prohibited dishonoring them. In January 2023, the Department of Defense accepted the commission's recommendations, and began plans to remove the memorial by the end of 2023. Plans were made for the statue to be removed and relocated, following a public consultation planned for autumn 2023. It is the first removal of a war memorial from Arlington National Cemetery.

Users of the memorial, including the Sons of Confederate Veterans, filed four lawsuits attempting to block the removal. In December 2023, a federal judge temporarily blocked removal of the monument after hearing reports of graves being disturbed during the removal process. The judge reversed the decision after touring the site and confirming a lack of disturbance related to the removal.

On December 20, 2023, Team Henry Enterprises, contracted through the U.S. Army, removed the statue by crane. Team Henry also removed the Robert E. Lee monument in Richmond, Virginia, the Lee Monument in Charlottesville, Virginia, and multiple other Confederate memorials in the state. All bronze elements of the memorial were removed later in the day, with the granite base and foundation left in place to avoid disturbing graves near the memorial. Virginia governor Glenn Youngkin has made arrangements for the memorial to be moved to the New Market Battlefield State Historical Park, on land owned by the Virginia Military Institute. The memorial was stored in a Defense Department facility in Virginia.

On June 13, 2024, Representative Andrew Clyde introduced H.Amdt. 978 "to relocate the Reconciliation Memorial, also known as the Reconciliation Monument, to its original location in Arlington National Cemetery." It was defeated by roll call, 230-192, with the Aye votes being only Republicans while the No votes included 24 Republicans with the rest being Democrats.

=== Plans for return ===
On August 5, 2025, it was announced that the monument would be reinstated, after resolutions were passed by both the Sons of Confederate Veterans and the Sons of Union Veterans of the Civil War along with the United Daughters of the Confederacy and the Daughters of Union Veterans of the Civil War. On August 5, 2025, Secretary of Defense Pete Hegseth announced in the Conservative opinion website "The Blaze" that the monument would return to Arlington National Cemetery. Hegseth said, "It never should have been taken down by woke lemmings. Unlike the left, we don't believe in erasing American history — we honor it."

The Statue is set to return by 2027. The US Army estimated the cost of the restoration to be ten million dollars.

== Bibliography ==
- Ashabranner, Brent K.; Ashabranner, Jennifer (1990). A Grateful Nation: The Story of Arlington National Cemetery. New York: Putnam. ISBN 9780399221880. OCLC 21406019.
- Atkinson, Rick (2007). Where Valor Rests: Arlington National Cemetery. Washington, D.C.: National Geographic Society. ISBN 9781426200892. OCLC 76820769.
- Blair, William A. (2004). Cities of the Dead: Contesting the Memory of the Civil War in the South, 1865–1914. Chapel Hill, N.C.: University of North Carolina Press. ISBN 9780807876237. OCLC 62157959.
- Brown, Fred R. (1909). History of the Ninth U.S. Infantry, 1799–1909. Chicago: R.R. Donnelley & Sons Co. OCLC 2180015 – via Google Books.
- Brown, Glenn; Bushong, William (2007). Glenn Brown's History of the United States Capitol. Washington, D.C.: Architect of the Capitol. ISBN 9780160753688. OCLC 38105638.
- Corfield, Justin (2009). "Arlington National Cemetery". In Pencak, William (ed.). Encyclopedia of the Veteran in America. Santa Barbara, Calif: ABC-CLIO. ISBN 9780313087592. OCLC 613959407. EBSCOhost 320311.
- Couper, William (2005). The Corps Forward: The Biographical Sketches of the VMI Cadets Who Fought in the Battle of New Market. Buena Vista, Va.: Mariner Publishing. ISBN 9780976823827. OCLC 60550749.
- Cox, Karen L. (2003). "The Confederate Monument at Arlington: A Token of Reconciliation". In Mills, Cynthia; Simpson, Pamela Hemenway (eds.). Monuments to the Lost Cause: Women, Art, and the Landscapes of Southern Memory. Knoxville: University of Tennessee Press. ISBN 9781572332720. OCLC 834195959.
- Cox, Karen L. (2003). Dixie's Daughters: The United Daughters of the Confederacy and the Preservation of Confederate Culture. Gainesville, Fla.: University Press of Florida. ISBN 9780813026251. OCLC 894959491.
- Cox, Karen L. (2008). "United Daughters of the Confederacy". In Frank, Lisa Tendrich (ed.). Women in the American Civil War. Santa Barbara, Calif.: ABC-CLIO. ISBN 9781851096008. OCLC 152580687.
- Dennee, Tim (2012). "African-American Civilians Interred in Section 27 of Arlington National Cemetery, 1864–1867" (PDF). Friends of Freedmen's Cemetery.
- Dodge, George W. (2006). Arlington National Cemetery. Charleston, S.C.: Arcadia Publishing. ISBN 9780738543260. OCLC 946794775.
- Doss, Erika Lee (2010). Memorial Mania: Public Feeling in America. Chicago: University of Chicago Press. ISBN 9780226159386. OCLC 457149557.
- Early, Curtis A. and; Early, Gloria J. (2011). Ohio Confederate Connection: Facts You May Not Know about the Civil War. Bloomington, Ind: iUniverse. ISBN 9781450273725. OCLC 747729780.
- Edmonds, Helen G. (1951). The Negro and Fusion Politics in North Carolina, 1894–1901 (Reprint ed.). Chapel Hill, N.C.: University of North Carolina Press. ISBN 9780807855492. OCLC 773281658.
- Ezekiel, Moses Jacob (1975). Gutmann, Joseph; Chyet, Stanley F. (eds.). Memoirs from the Baths of Diocletian. Detroit: Wayne State University Press. ISBN 9780814315255. OCLC 1103294.
- Virginia: A Guide to the Old Dominion. New York: Federal Works Agency. 1940. OCLC 946228230.
- Flagel, Thomas R. The History Buff's Guide to the Civil War. Naperville, Ill.: Cumberland House, 2010.
- Foster, Gaines M. Ghosts of the Confederacy: Defeat, the Lost Cause, and the Emergence of the New South, 1865 to 1913. New York: Oxford University Press, 1987.
- Fuller, A. James. "Introduction: Perspectives on American Power and Empire." In America, War and Power: Defining the State, 1775–2005. Lawrence Sondhaus and A. James Fuller, eds. Florence, Ky.: Taylor & Francis, 2007.
- Gibson, Keith. "Ezekiel, Moses Jacob." In The Grove Encyclopedia of American Art. Joan M. Marter, ed. New York: Oxford University Press, 2011.
- Grissom, Michael Andrew. When the South Was Southern. Gretna, La.: Pelican Publishing Co., 1994.
- Gross, Jennifer L. "The United Daughters of the Confederacy, Confederate Widows, and the lost Cause." In Women on Their Own: Interdisciplinary Perspectives on Being Single. Rudolph M. Bell and Virginia Yans, eds. New Brunswick, N.J.: Rutgers University Press, 2010.
- Heidler, David Stephen; Heidler, Jeanne T.; and Coles, David J. Encyclopedia of the American Civil War: A Political, Social, and Military History. New York: Norton, 2002.
- Herbert, Hilary A. History of the Arlington Confederate Monument. Richmond, Va.: United Daughters of the Confederacy, 1915.
- Jacob, Kathryn Allamong. Testament to Union: Civil War Monuments in Washington, D.C. Baltimore, Md.: Johns Hopkins University Press, 1998.
- Johnson, Clint. The Politically Incorrect Guide to the South: And Why It Will Rise Again. Washington, D.C.: Regnery Publishing, 2007.
- Loewen, James W. and Sebesta, Edward H. The Confederate and Neo-Confederate Reader: The "Great Truth" About the "Lost Cause". Jackson, Miss.: University Press of Mississippi, 2010.
- Logan, Mary Simmerson Cunningham. The Part Taken By Women in American History. Wilmington, Del.: The Perry-Nalle Publishing Co., 1912.
- Marling, Karal Ann. Old Glory: Unfurling History. Hawkhurst, Kent, UK: Bunker Hill Publishing, 2004.
- Martinez, J. Michael and Harris, Robert M. "Graves, Worms, and Epitaphs: Confederate Monuments in the Southern Landscape." In Confederate Symbols in the Contemporary South. James Michael Martinez, ed. Gainesville, Fla.: University Press of Florida, 2000.
- Mayo, James M. War Memorials as Political Landscape: The American Experience and Beyond. New York: Praeger, 1988.
- Mills, Cynthia. "Introduction." In Monuments to the Lost Cause: Women, Art, and the Landscapes of Southern Memory. Cynthia Mills and Pamela Hemenway Simpson, eds. Knoxville: University of Tennessee Press, 2003.
- Morman, Armaad R. Veterans' Benefits: Burial Benefits and National Cemeteries. Darby, Pa.: Diane Publishing, 2011.
- Nickeson, Dawn Ottevaere. "Philippine Islands, U.S. Acquisition of." In The Encyclopedia of the Spanish-American and Philippine-American Wars: A Political, Social, and Military History. Spencer Tucker, ed. Santa Barbara, Calif.: ABC-CLIO, 2009.
- Parzych, Cynthia. Arlington National Cemetery. Guilford, Conn.: GPP Travel, 2009.
- Peters, James Edward. Arlington National Cemetery, Shrine to America's Heroes. Bethesda, Md.: Woodbine House, 2000.
- Poole, Robert M. On Hallowed Ground: The Story of Arlington National Cemetery. New York: Bloomsbury Publishing USA, 2009.
- Poppenheim, Mary B. The History of the United Daughters of the Confederacy, 1894-1929. Volumes 1. Richmond, Va.: Garrett and Massie, 1938.
- Quartermaster General of the Army. Compilation of Laws (revised Statutes and Statutes at Large) Relating to the Quartermaster Corps. Washington, D.C.: Government Printing Office, 1914.
- Rowe, Jr., Joseph M. "Treaty of Paris of 1898." In Historical Dictionary of European Imperialism. James Stuart Olson and Robert Shadle, eds. New York: Greenwood Press, 1991.
- Savage, Kirk. "Afterward: War/Memory/History: Toward a Remixed Understanding." In Remixing the Civil War: Meditations on the Sesquicentennial. Thomas J. Brown, ed. Baltimore, Md.: Johns Hopkins University Press, 2011.
- Sedore, Timothy S. An Illustrated Guide to Virginia's Confederate Monuments. Carbondale, Ill.: Southern Illinois University Press, 2011.
- Selcer, Richard F. "Faithfully and Forever Your Soldier": Gen. George E. Pickett, CSA. Gettysburg, Pa.: Farnsworth House Military Impressions, 1995.
- Subcommittee on Appropriations. Hearings Before Subcommittee of House Committee on Appropriations on Sundry Civil Appropriation Bill for 1913. Part 3. Committee on Appropriations. U.S. House of Representatives. 62d Cong., 2d sess. Washington, D.C.: Government Printing Office, 1912.
- Sutherland, Daniel E. The Confederate Carpetbaggers. Baton Rouge: Louisiana State University Press, 1988.
- Trout, Steven. On the Battlefield of Memory: The First World War and American Remembrance, 1919–1941. Tuscaloosa, Ala.: University of Alabama Press, 2010.
- United Daughters of the Confederacy. Minutes of the Fourteenth Annual Convention of the United Daughters of the Confederacy Held in Norfolk, Virginia, November 13–16, 1907. Opelika, Ala.: Post Publishing Company, 1908.
- United Daughters of the Confederacy. Minutes of the Fifteenth Annual Convention of the United Daughters of the Confederacy Held in Atlanta, Georgia, November 11–14, 1908. Opelika, Ala.: Post Publishing Company, 1909.
- United Daughters of the Confederacy. Minutes of the Sixteenth Annual Convention of the United Daughters of the Confederacy Held in Houston, Texas, November 19–22, 1909. Opelika, Ala.: Post Publishing Company, 1909.
- United Daughters of the Confederacy. Minutes of the Seventeenth Annual Convention of the United Daughters of the Confederacy Held in Little Rock, Arkansas, November 8–12, 1910. Paducah, Ky.: Paducah Printing Company, 1911.
- United Daughters of the Confederacy. Minutes of the Twentieth Annual Convention of the United Daughters of the Confederacy Held in New Orleans, Louisiana, November 12–15, 1913. Raleigh, N.C.: Edwards and Broughton Printing Company, 1914.
- United Daughters of the Confederacy. Minutes of the Twenty-First Annual Convention of the United Daughters of the Confederacy Held in Savannah, Georgia, November 11–14, 1914. Raleigh, N.C.: Edwards and Broughton Printing Company, 1915.
- United Daughters of the Confederacy. Minutes of the Twenty-Fourth Annual Convention of the United Daughters of the Confederacy Held in Chattanooga, Tennessee, November 14–17, 1917. Richmond, Va.: Richmond Press Inc. Printers, 1918.
- Wilson, Charles Reagan (2009). Baptized in Blood: The Religion of the Lost Cause, 1865–1920. Athens, Ga.: University of Georgia Press. ISBN 9780820334257. OCLC 318869606.
- Wurman, Richard Saul (2007). Access Washington, D.C. (10th ed.). New York: Access Press. ISBN 9780061230806. OCLC 1048061558.
