= Michael Fellman =

Michael Fellman (1943, Madison, Wisconsin – June 11, 2012, Vancouver, British Columbia) was an American and Canadian historian and professor. He served as the professor emeritus of history at Simon Fraser University in Vancouver, British Columbia, Canada.

Fellman was born in Madison, Wisconsin. He was educated at the University of Michigan (BA, 1965) and Northwestern University (PhD, 1969). He was the son of David Fellman, Vilas Professor Emeritus at the University of Wisconsin, Madison.

== Bibliography ==
- The Unbounded Frame: Freedom and Community in Nineteenth-Century American Utopianism Greenwood, 1973 ISBN 0837163692
- Inside War: The Guerilla Conflict in Missouri During the American Civil War Oxford University Press, 1990 ISBN 9780195064711
- Citizen Sherman: A Life of William Tecumseh Sherman Random House, 1995 ISBN 978-0-679-42966-1
- The Making of Robert E. Lee. Random House, 2000 ISBN 0801874114
- This Terrible War: The Civil War and Its Aftermath (coauthored with Daniel E. Sutherland and Lesley J. Gordon). Longman, 2003 ISBN 9780321052858
- In the Name of God and Country: Reconsidering Terrorism in American History Yale University Press, 2009 ISBN 978-0-300-11510-9
- Views from the Dark Side of American History Louisiana State University Press, 2011 ISBN 978-0807139028
