= David Fellman =

American legal scholar (1907–2003)

David Fellman (1907 – 2003) was an American political scientist and constitutional scholar and advocate for academic freedom, who taught general constitutional law, administrative law and civil liberties.

== Background ==
David Fellman was born on September 14, 1907, in Omaha, Nebraska. In 1905, his orthodox Jewish family immigrated to Omaha, Nebraska, from the Volhynia, Belarus (now Ukraine). David Fellman was the third of seven children (six boys, one girl). At age 21, an older brother died; a few years later, his father died.

Fellman attended Omaha Central High School where he was president of the Mathematics society, a member of the Speakers Bureau and on the debate teams that won the district championship in 1924-25 and the state championship in 1925. He won the state contest in extemporaneous speaking.

Fellman taught Hebrew in a religious school to support himself while attending the University of Nebraska. As an undergraduate, he was on the debate team for three years. He was a member of Nebraska's “Think-Shop” and was elected to Delta Sigma Rho, the national debating honorary society, in May 1927, serving as president of that organization for one year. He was a member of Sigma Alpha Mu fraternity, and was a reader for the political science department. For two years, he wrote a semi-weekly column in The Daily Nebraskan, official student newspaper entitled “A Student Looks at Public Affairs."

He received his A.B. in 1929, and was inducted into Phi Beta Kappa; he also received an M.A. in 1930 from the University of Nebraska. He was granted a teaching fellowship by the University of Nebraska in the political science department while pursuing work to prepare for his doctoral degree. In 1931, Fellman transferred to Yale University, having been the recipient of the Cowles fellowship in government. He studied political theory under Dr. Francis Coker, then a scholarship in philosophy in 1932, then the Sterling fellowship in government in 1933. He was awarded the Ph.D. from Yale University in 1934.

== Career ==
Upon receiving his doctorate, Fellman returned to the University of Nebraska as a professor until relocating to the University of Wisconsin-Madison in 1947, and remaining there until his retirement. He became involved in Wisconsin state government and participated in several commissions and panels which helped review and eventually recommend constitutional changes.

He taught at the University of Nebraska from 1934 to 1947 and the University of Wisconsin–Madison from 1947 until he retired in 1979. He maintained an office in North Hall at UW–Madison through the late 1980s. One newspaper remembered him as "beloved of generations of students who were attracted by his friendliness and charm as well as his intellectual stature." One former student, David Obey, wrote of him, "Anyone who remembers John Houseman’s portrayal of the law professor in The Paper Chase will know what Fellman was like – intimidating, tough, clipped, proper, dry, acerbic.”

In the 1960s, Fellman became active in Wisconsin state government. He wrote speeches for Governors Gaylord A. Nelson and John W. Reynolds, Jr. In 1959, he was appointed to the governor's Commission on Human Rights and served for nine years. They initiated surveys and drafted legislation, such as the fair housing bill submitted to the state legislature in 1965. In 1960 and 1963, he was named to the Governor's Commission on Constitutional Revision. They were tasked with "drafting of the actual texts of suitable constitutional amendments, the publicizing of their purpose and the promotion of their adoption." Among the notable changes that resulted was the increase of the term for governor from two years to four years beginning in 1970. In 1970, he was appointed by Chief Justice E. Harold Hallows of the Wisconsin Supreme Court to be chairman of the Committee to Recommend Rules on Use of Sound and Camera Equipment in the Courtroom and to advise the court and develop specific recommendations for use of such equipment, which was prohibited at that time.

Until the 1960s, the University of Wisconsin-Madison lacked any endowed chairs. When the Vilas estate, bequeathed to the university in 1908, first became available for distribution, the first step was creation of several Vilas professorships, awarded by campus-wide competition. David Fellman was among the first group, named in 1962. He held the chair until his retirement.

== Personal life and death ==
Fellman married Sarah (died 1994); they had two children, Laura and Michael Fellman (1942 - 2012), Professor Emeritus of History, Simon Fraser University (SFU), Vancouver, Canada.

Fellman was president of the Midwest Political Science Association, 1955–1956, founding editor of that association's Midwest Journal of Political Science (now American Journal of Political Science), 1957–1959, vice president of the American Political Science Association, 1959–1960; and on the board of editors for The American Political Science Review of the received the Governmental Affairs Award from the Social Science Research Council, 1959-1960; senior research Fulbright fellow, Great Britain (London School of Economics), 1961–1962; holder of research grants from the Fund for the Republic, 1957–1958 and the Social Science Research Council, 1959–1960; and recipient of an honorary degree (Doctor of Laws) from the University of Nebraska, 1966.

Fellman was a member of the American Association of University Professors ("AAUP") for sixty-one years, on its Committee A from 1957 to 1971, chaired it from 1959 to 1964, was president of the AAUP from 1964 to 1966 and continued as a member of the Governing Board of its Legal Defense Fund into the 1990s.

David Fellman died age 96 in Madison, Wisconsin, on November 23, 2003.

== Works ==
Fellman wrote an annual article for the American Political Science Review from 1949 to 1961 on constitutional law, reviewing the prior year's work of the U.S. Supreme Court. His other writings include numerous articles published in law and political science journals, contributions to various encyclopedias and single chapters to a number of books.

Books authored

- The Defendant's Rights Today, The University of Wisconsin Press, 1976, ISBN 0-299-07200-2 cloth, ISBN 0-299-07204-5 paper, LCCN 76--41869
- The Defendant's Rights under English Law, The University of Wisconsin Press, 1966, Library of Congress Catalog Card Number 66-11803 OCLC ocm00407827
- Religion in American Public Law, Boston University Press, 1965, Library of Congress Catalog Card No. 65-17006 OCLC ocm01058709
- The Constitutional Right of Association, The University of Chicago Press, Chicago, IL, 1963, Library of Congress Catalog Card Number: 63-9728 OCLC ocm00497552
- The Limits of Freedom, Rutgers University Press, New Brunswick, NJ, 1959, Library of Congress Catalog Card Number: 59-14425 OCLC ocm00498133
- The Defendant’s Rights, Rinehart & Company, Inc., New York, 1958, Library of Congress Catalog Card Number: 57-12386 OCLC ocm01227493
- The Censorship of Books, University of Wisconsin Press, Madison, WI, 1957, OCLC No. 3559584 (35-page pamphlet)

Journal articles

- November 1930, "Due Process of Law in Nebraska," Nebraska Law Bulletin, Volume 9, No. 2
- February 1931, "Due Process of Law in Nebraska: Police Power," Nebraska Law Bulletin, Volume 9, No. 3
- May 1931, "Due Process of Law in Nebraska," Nebraska Law Bulletin, Volume 9, No. 4
- May 1932, "Due Process of Law in Nebraska: Notice and Hearings," Nebraska Law Bulletin, Volume 10, No. 4
- December 1938, "Diminution of Judicial Salaries,” Iowa Law Review
- January 1940, “Intergovernmental Taxation Today,” The Annals of the American Academy of Political and Social Science, Vol. 207, Issue 1, Intergovernmental Relations in the United States, Pages 27–37
- July 1940, “The European Background of Early American Ideas Concerning Property,” Temple University Law Quarterly, Philadelphia, Pennsylvania
- January 1941, “A Case Study in Administrative Law—The Regulation of Barbers,” Washington University Law Review, Volume 26, Issue 2: Page 212-242
- May – Jun 1945, “Some Consequences of Increased Federal Activity in Law Enforcement,” Journal of Criminal Law & Criminology (1931-1951), Volume 35, Issue 1: Pages 16–33
- Autumn 1945, "What Is Liberalism?" Prairie Schooner, Lincoln, Nebraska
- December 1947, " Federalism,” American Political Science Review, Vol. 41, Issue 6: Pages 1142-1160
- February 1948, "Federalism and the Commerce Clause, 1937 - 1947", Journal of Politics, Vol. 10, No 1: Pages 155-167
- Spring 1949, “Recent Tendencies in Civil Liberties Decisions of the Supreme Court," Cornell Law Review, Volume 34, Issue 3, Article 3: Pages 331-351
- Winter 1950, “Negroes and the Federal Courts,” Prairie Schooner, Lincoln, Nebraska, Vol. 24, No. 4: Pages 409–421
- May 1951, “The Constitutional Right to Counsel in Federal Courts” Nebraska Law Review, Volume 30: Pages 559-599
- May 1951, “The Supreme Court as Protector of Civil Rights: Freedom of Expression,” The Annals of the American Academy of Political and Social Science, Vol. 275, Civil Rights in America, Pages 61–74
- November 1951, “The Federal Right to Counsel in State Courts,” Nebraska Law Review, Volume 31: Pages 15–54
- Fall 1953, “Political Immaturity,” Prairie Schooner, Lincoln, Nebraska, Vol. 27, No. 3: Pages 257–263
- March 1955, “The Right to Counsel under State Law,” Wisconsin Law Review, Pages 281-328
- January 1957, “The Loyalty Defendants,” Wisconsin Law Review, Pages 4–39
- February 1957, "Cruel and Unusual Punishments, Journal of Politics, Vol. 19, No 1: Pages 34–45
- November 1960, "Association with 'Bad People,” Journal of Politics, Vol. 22, No. 4: Pages 620-28
- January 1961, “Constitutional Rights of Association,” The Supreme Court Review, University of Chicago Press, Vol. 1961: Pages 74–134
- July 1975, "The Separation of Powers and the Judiciary," The Review of Politics, Vol. 37, No. 3: Pages 357-376
- Autumn 1987, "Original Intent: A Footnote," The Review of Politics Vol. 49, No.4: Pages 574-578

Books (co-)edited

- The Supreme Court and Education, Teachers College Press, Columbia University Press, New York, 1960, Library of Congress Catalog Card No. 60-8488 OCLC ocm04107050
- Readings in American National and State Government, edited by David Fellman, Lane W. Lancaster, Rinehart & Company, Inc., New York, 1950 OCLC 1013547
- Readings in American National Government, Rinehart & Company, Inc., New York, 1947 OCLC ocm00988655
- August 1946, "Post-War Governments of Europe," Journal of Politics, Volume 8, No. 3, 241-247

Book chapters

- "The Nationalization of American Civil Liberties," Essays on the Constitution of the United States, edited by M. Judd Harmon, Port Washington, N.Y. : Kennikat Press, 1978. ISBN 9780804692106 ISBN 0804692106, OCLC ocm03844682
- "Congressional Odyssey: The Saga of a Senate Bill," America as a Multicultural Society, special editor Milton M. Gordon, Philadelphia, PA : American Academy of Political and Social Science, 1981. ISBN 0877612609 ISBN 9780877612605 ISBN 0877612617 ISBN 9780877612612 OCLC ocm07319284

Encyclopedic articles

- Primary Contributor, "Constitutional Law," Encyclopædia Britannica, published online July 22, 2016

SCOTUS Review articles

- April 1949, “Constitutional Law in 1947-48: The Constitutional Decisions of the Supreme Court of the United States in the October Term, 1947,” The American Political Science Review, Vol. 43, No. 2, pp. 275–308
- March 1952, "Constitutional Law in 1950-1951,” The American Political Science Review, Vol. 46, No. 1, pp. 158–199
- March 1953, “Constitutional Law in 1951-1952,” The American Political Science Review, Vol. 47, No. 1, pp. 126–170
- March 1954, “Constitutional Law in 1952-1953,” The American Political Science Review, Vol. 48, No. 1, pp. 63–113
- March 1955, "Constitutional Law in 1953-1954,” The American Political Science Review, Vol. 49, No. 1, pp. 63–106
- March 1956, “Constitutional Law in 1954-1955,” The American Political Science Review, Vol. 50, No. 1, pp. 43–100
- March 1957, “Constitutional Law in 1955-1956,” The American Political Science Review, Vol. 51, No. 1, pp. 158–196
- March 1958, "Constitutional Law in 1956-1957,” The American Political Science Review, Vol. 52, No. 1, pp. 140–191
- March 1959, "Constitutional Law in 1957-1958,” The American Political Science Review, Vol. 53, No. 1, pp. 138–180
- March 1960, “Constitutional Law in 1958-1959: I,” The American Political Science Review, Vol. 54, No. 1, pp. 167–199
- June 1960, “Constitutional Law in 1958-1959: II:,” The American Political Science Review, Vol. 54, No. 2, pp. 474–493
- March 1961, “Constitutional Law in 1959-1960,” The American Political Science Review, Vol. 55, No. 1, pp. 112–135
