= The Making of Robert E. Lee =

Biography of Robert E. Lee

- Author: Michael Fellman
- Language: English
- Genre: Biography
- Publisher: Johns Hopkins University Press
- Publication date: 2000, 2003 (paperback)
- Media type: Print (book)
- Pages: 384
- ISBN: 0-679-45650-3
- OCLC: 43207735
- Dewey Decimal: 973.7/3/092 B 21
- LC Class: E467.1.L4 F45 2000

The Making of Robert E. Lee by Michael Fellman is a biography of the famous Confederate general. It looks mostly at his character and beliefs. It says relatively little about the details of particular battles, though it speculates about why he may have made particular choices.

== Lee's origins ==
Fellman describes Robert E. Lee's singular position as the son of Henry "Light Horse Harry" Lee, a hero of the American War of Independence. His relatively impoverished upbringing, after his father lost most of his fortune and suffered injuries that later killed him after being attacked by a mob in Baltimore in 1812. But how he remained part of the close-knit elite of Virginia.

Young Robert E. Lee made a great impression as a cadet at West Point. Despite his lack of wealth he married Mary Anna Randolph Custis, the great-granddaughter of Martha Washington and step-granddaughter of George Washington. And the problems he had when he had to manage her father's plantation after she inherited it. Fellman discusses the accusations made that Lee had had some runaway slaves whipped, and reckons them to be broadly true.

Fellman argued that Lee successfully modelled himself on the ideal of George Washington, achieving a very high degree of self-control according to the ideals of the southern gentry. That though Lee had reservations about slavery, he was against abolishing it and wished that all freed blacks could be sent back to Africa. Fellman also argues that Lee was out of tune with the rising tide of democracy, North and South.

== Lee in the Civil War ==
Military matters are dealt with in four chapters, with a fifth that discusses Lee's views on irregular warfare and guerrilla warfare. Fellman sees Lee's career as falling into three phases:

Initial setbacks. He entered the war with a reputation for being the South's best general. But he could not overcome the difficulties he found in West Virginia and was defeated at the Battle of Cheat Mountain. He was then sent to organise the coastal defenses of Carolina and Georgia, but was hampered by the lack of an effective Confederate navy and was once again blamed by the Confederate press. He became military adviser to Jefferson Davis, president of the Confederacy, whom he knew from West Point.

Sudden success. When Joseph E. Johnston was gravely wounded, Lee was put in command of the defences of Richmond, and achieved a spectacular turn-around. This was followed by a run of victories and optimism, despite the setback at Sharpsburg (Antietam). This lasted up until Gettysburg, which Fellman interprets as a defeat caused by Lee's belief that he could win the war by one big victory.

Slow decline. After Gettysburg, Lee was stalemated by Meade and then driven back by Grant. He could see that the Confederacy was losing, but felt it his duty to continue fighting. Fellman considers that it was Lee's religious faith and belief in the righteousness of the Confederate cause that prevented him from calling for an early surrender.

Fellman also discusses Lee's decision to limit guerilla warfare during the main conflict and his desire to avoid it after he had surrendered the main army. There was also the issue of exchanging prisoners, which broke down because Lee and other Confederate leaders considered that captured Union soldiers who had been slaves must become slaves again.

== After the war ==
Fellman then describes Lee's role after the war, quoting Lee as apparently hoping that the freed blacks would leave Virginia entirely and could be replaced by white immigrants. He notes that Lee never spoke out against lynchings, though as President of Washington College, he did expel students who got involved in mob violence.
