= Daniel E. Sutherland =

American historian and author

Daniel E. Sutherland is an American historian who has written books about the American Civil War and 19th century America. His book A Savage Conflict is about guerilla warfare in that war, and The Confederate Carpetbaggers is about southerners who moved north after the war. As of 2009, he was distinguished professor of history at the University of Arkansas.

In 1997, The New York Times published his review of The Confederate War by Gary W. Gallagher. He was part of a panel discussion on "The Civil War West of the Mississippi", broadcast in 2012 on C-SPAN.

== Works ==
- The Confederate Carpetbaggers. Baton Rogue, Louisiana: Louisiana State University Press (1988) ISBN 9780807113936
- The Emergence of Total War, edited by Grady McWhiney. Fort Worth, Texas: Ryan Place Publishers (1996)
- Fredericksburg and Chancellorsville: The Dare Mark Campaign. University of Nebraska Press (1998)
- Guerrillas, Unionists, and Violence on the Confederate Home Front. University of Arkansas Press (1999)
- This Terrible War: The Civil War and Its Aftermath (coauthored with Michael Fellman and Lesley J. Gordon). Longman (2003). ISBN 9780321052858
- A Savage Conflict: The Decisive Role of Guerrillas in the American Civil War. Chapel Hill, North Carolina: University of North Carolina Press (2009)
- Seasons of War: The Ordeal of a Confederate Community, 1861-1865. New York: Free Press (1995)
- Whistler: A Life for Art's Sake. New Haven: Yale University Press (2014), about artist James McNeill Whistler
- Whistler's Mother: Portrait of an Extraordinary Life (coauthored with Georgia Toutziari). New Haven: Yale University Press (2018) ISBN 9780300229684
