= Lesley J. Gordon =

- Education: College of William & Mary (BA); University of Georgia (PhD)
- Occupation: Historian
- Employer: University of Alabama

Lesley J. Gordon is an American military historian specializing in the American Civil War. She holds the Charles G. Summersell Chair of Southern History at the University of Alabama.

== Education and career ==
Gordon attended East Granby High School in East Granby, Connecticut. She studied history at the College of William & Mary and obtained her PhD from the University of Georgia. She succeeded George C. Rable as the Charles G. Summersell Professor of Southern History at Alabama in 2016, having previously held positions at Murray State University and the University of Akron.

1n 2022, Gordon became the chair of the editorial board of the University of Alabama Press.

== Work on the American Civil War ==
Gordon's research focuses on the American Civil War. Her first book, published in 1998, was a biography of the Confederate general George E. Pickett, famed for his failed charge at the Battle of Gettysburg. Gordon argued that Pickett's posthumous reputation as tragic hero of the Lost Cause was largely the creation of his wife, LaSalle Pickett, who made a living giving talks about her deceased husband on the lecture circuit for more than fifty years after his death, and that his actual achievements were more modest. The book was described as "well-written and exhaustively researched", and praised for bringing attention to the actions of women in the period.

Her other books include This Terrible War (2003), a textbook on the Civil War co-authored with Daniel E. Sutherland and Michael Fellman, currently in its third edition, and A Broken Regiment (2014), a regimental history of the 16th Connecticut Infantry Regiment. She has also edited and contributed to a number of edited volumes, and was formerly the editor of the journal Civil War History.

In 2017, Gordon appeared on the American version of the genealogy documentary series Who Do You Think You Are?; she revealed to actor Noah Wyle that one of his ancestors fought in the Confederate Army.

== Selected publications ==
- Gordon, Lesley J. (1998). General George E. Pickett in Life and Legend. Chapel Hill, NC: UNC Press. ISBN 978-0-8078-5427-3.
- —; Fellman, Michael; Sutherland, Daniel E. (2003). This Terrible War: The Civil War and Its Aftermath. New York, NY: Longman. ISBN 978-0-321-05285-8.
- —; Inscoe, John C., eds. (2005). Inside the Confederate Nation: Essays in Honor of Emory M. Thomas. Baton Rouge, LA: LSU Press. ISBN 9780807130995.
- —; Bleser, Carol K., eds. (2007). Intimate Strategies of the Civil War: Military Commanders and Their Wives. Oxford: Oxford University Press. ISBN 978-0195330854.
- —; Fellman, Michael; Sutherland, Daniel E. (2014). This Terrible War: The Civil War and Its Aftermath (3rd ed.). New York, NY: Pearson. ISBN 978-0205007912.
- — (2014). A Broken Regiment: The 16th Connecticut's Civil War. Baton Rouge, LA: LSU Press. ISBN 9780807157305.
- — (2025). Dread Danger: Cowardice and Combat in the American Civil War. Cambridge University Press. ISBN 9781108729192
