= Leslie Gordon (cricketer) =

New Zealand cricketer

Leslie Gordon (1882 – 28 October 1946) was a New Zealand cricketer who played for Canterbury.

Gordon played in one first-class cricket match for the team during the 1917/18 season against Otago. From the lower order, he scored 19 runs in the first innings in which he batted, and 11 runs in the second. Gordon bowled 9 overs in the match, conceding 14 runs.
