= The Confederate Carpetbaggers =

1988 book by Daniel E. Sutherland

- Author: Daniel E. Sutherland
- Subject: Life in the Reconstruction era
- Publisher: Louisiana State University Press
- Publication date: 1988
- Pages: 360
- ISBN: 9780807113936

The Confederate Carpetbaggers is a 1988 book by American historian Daniel E. Sutherland. The book compiles and analyzes veterans of the Confederate States of America who left the American South for the North in the wake of the American Civil War. The title mirrors Union veterans who moved south, who were labeled "Carpetbaggers" by southerners.

== Commentary and reviews ==
- Bellows, Barbara L. (1990). "Review of The Confederate Carpetbaggers". The Southwestern Historical Quarterly. 93 (3): 405–406. ISSN 0038-478X.
- Cimbala, Paul A. (1989). "Essay Review: Carpetbaggers, Freedmen, and the Unfinished Revolution: Reconstruction and the American Mind". The Pennsylvania Magazine of History and Biography. 113 (2): 265–275. ISSN 0031-4587.
- Current, Richard N. (1990). "Review of The Confederate Carpetbaggers". The American Historical Review. 95 (1): 263–264. doi:10.2307/2163146. ISSN 0002-8762.
- Formwalt, Lee W. (1990). "Review of The Confederate Carpetbaggers". The Journal of Southern History. 56 (1): 134–135. doi:10.2307/2210690. ISSN 0022-4642.
- Foster, Gaines M. (1990). "Review of The Confederate Carpetbaggers". The Virginia Magazine of History and Biography. 98 (2): 329–330. ISSN 0042-6636.
- Perman, Michael (1989). "Review of The Confederate Carpetbaggers". The Journal of American History. 76 (2): 609–610. doi:10.2307/1908044. ISSN 0021-8723.
- Rable, George C. (1988). "Review of The Confederate Carpetbaggers". The Georgia Historical Quarterly. 72 (4): 756–757. ISSN 0016-8297.
- Reidy, Joseph P. (1990). "The Confederate Carpetbaggers (review)". Civil War History. 36 (1): 83–85. doi:10.1353/cwh.1990.0024. S2CID 144970517. Project MUSE 420548.
- Parker, Susan (1988). "The Confederate Carpetbaggers". Library Journal. 113 (11): 57.
- Trefousse, Hans L. (1989). "Review of The Confederate Carpetbaggers". The North Carolina Historical Review. 66 (1): 118–119. ISSN 0029-2494.
- Trelease, Allen W. (1989). "Review of The Confederate Carpetbaggers". The Florida Historical Quarterly. 68 (1): 107–108. ISSN 0015-4113.
