= Anne Hill Carter Lee =

First Lady of Virginia

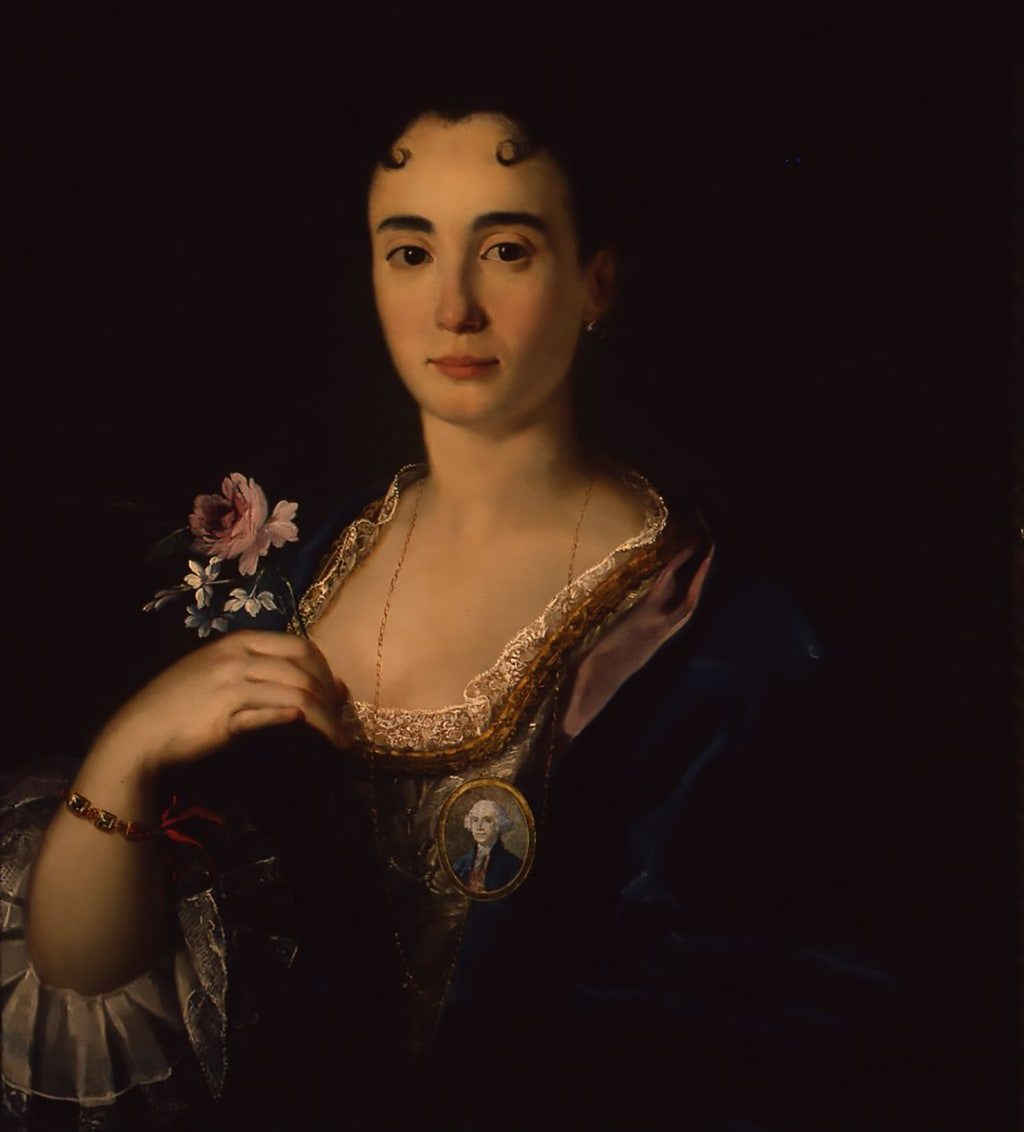

First Lady of Virginia
- In role December 1, 1791 – December 1, 1794
- Governor: Henry Lee III
- Preceded by: Martha Cocke Randolph
- Succeeded by: Mary Ritchie Hopper Brooke

Personal details
- Born: Anne Hill Carter; March 26, 1773 Shirley Plantation, Charles City County, Colony of Virginia
- Died: June 26, 1829 (aged 56) Ravensworth Plantation, Fairfax County, Virginia, U.S.
- Resting place: University Chapel; Washington and Lee University; Lexington, Virginia, U.S.
- Spouse: Henry Lee III (m. 1793; died 1818)
- Children: 6, including: Sydney Smith Lee; Robert E. Lee
- Parent(s): Charles Carter; Anne Butler Moore

Anne Hill Carter Lee (March 26, 1773 – June 26, 1829) was the First Lady of Virginia from 1791 to 1794 as the wife of the ninth governor, Henry Lee III. She was the mother of the general-in-chief of the Confederate States of America, Robert E. Lee. As a separated wife and then as a widow, she was the head of her household at Lee Corner, Alexandria, Virginia, which is now known as the Robert E. Lee Boyhood Home. Her chronic pain and straitened circumstances play a significant role in her son Robert's biography.

== Early life ==
Anne was born at the family seat, Shirley Plantation in Charles City County, on March 26, 1773. A member of the planter class, she was born into a patrician family of tidewater Virginia and was the daughter of Charles Carter (1732–1806), the fifth-generation owner of Shirley Plantation, and Anne Butler (née Moore) Carter (1750–1809).

Through her grandfather, John Carter (1696–1742), she was the great-granddaughter of Robert "King" Carter, the 25th Speaker of the Virginia House of Burgesses from 1696 to 1697 and the Colonial Governor of Virginia from 1726 to 1727.

== Marriage ==
On June 18, 1793, she married the 9th Governor of Virginia, the widower Henry "Light Horse Harry" Lee (1756–1818), in the mansion's parlor. After Lee retired from the governorship in December 1794, she followed him to his Lee family holdings in northern Virginia. Six children were born to this marriage:

- Algernon Sidney Lee (1795–1796), who died in infancy at Sully Plantation, buried there in an unmarked grave.
- Charles Carter Lee (1798–1871), who married Lucy Penn Taylor (1827–1913).
- Anne Kinloch Lee (1800–1864), who married William Louis Marshall (1803–1869).
- Sydney Smith Lee (1802–1869), who married Anne Marie Mason (1811–1898) of Virginia.
- Robert Edward Lee (1807–1870), the Confederate States of America general who married Mary Anna Randolph Custis (1808–1873) great-granddaughter of Martha Washington by her first husband Daniel Parke Custis.
- Catharine Mildred Lee (1811–1856), who married Edward Vernon Childe (1804–1861).

Anne Carter Lee's time as a wealthy patrician of northern Virginia would, however, be short. Their principal plantation, Stratford Hall, was relinquished in 1808 by entail to her stepson Henry Lee IV. Her husband had suffered repeated financial reverses, characterized by poor investments, and was forced to declare bankruptcy in 1809 and move to debtor's prison. Anne Carter and "Light Horse Harry" were separated for one year while the husband was under confinement.

In 1810, the reunited couple tried to resume life together in Alexandria. Despite the fall in his honor and standing, the former governor "Light Horse Harry" had maintained fervent ties to the Federalist Party, and passionately opposed the decision by the other U.S. political party, the Jeffersonians, to declare war on Great Britain in the War of 1812. In a July 1812 outbreak of political violence in Baltimore, War Hawk rioters raided a Federalist strongpoint and tried to lynch its defenders, including Harry Lee. Anne Carter Lee was forced to learn that her husband had suffered serious physical and psychological wounds in the mob outburst.

As life for him in Alexandria had become impossible, Henry Lee was forced to leave his wife and family. Lee emigrated to the South Atlantic coast and the Caribbean in a series of futile attempts to find a place to recuperate from his injuries. He died on the Georgia coast on 25 March 1818, leaving Anne Carter Lee a middle-class widow.

=== Widowhood ===
As a widow and the head of her household, Anne Carter Lee brought up her surviving children during her remaining eleven years of life. A small bequest from her Carter family enabled her to maintain the house in modest comfort. She suffered, however, from chronic health conditions herself. Her medical diagnosis, if any, is unknown, and her health challenges were primarily recorded as an additional obstacle to the young life of her fourth son Robert. Born in 1807, in his adolescent years Robert E. Lee assisted his mother to run the household. Although not poor, she was not able to face college tuition bills for Robert, who therefore sought higher education opportunities at the United States Military Academy at West Point. Young Lee did not hesitate to use his mother's Carter family kinship ties to co-sign his West Point application.

During young Lee's West Point years (1825-1829), Anne Carter Lee's health further declined. She clung to life until the graduation of her son, and was given a place to live and be nursed at the home of an uncle, William Henry Fitzhugh, the Fairfax County plantation of Ravensworth. Anne Hill Carter Lee died in Ravensworth on 26 July 1829. Her son Robert named one of his daughters, Anne Carter Lee (1839-1862), in honor of his mother.

=== Descendants ===
Through her son Sydney, she was the grandmother of Confederate Major General Fitzhugh Lee (1835–1905), who later became Governor of Virginia (from 1886 to 1890), diplomat and writer; and served as Major General of U.S. Volunteers during the Spanish–American War, as well as least four more grandsons who served in the Confederate States Army or Navy.

Through her son Robert, she was the grandmother of seven, including George Washington Custis Lee (1832–1913), who served as Major General in the Confederate Army and aide-de-camp to President Jefferson Davis, who died unmarried; Mary Custis Lee (1835–1918), who died unmarried; William Henry Fitzhugh Lee (1837–1891), who served as Major General in the Confederate Army who married twice; Anne Carter Lee (1839–1862), who died unmarried of typhoid fever; Eleanor Agnes Lee (1841–1873), who died unmarried of tuberculosis; Robert Edward Lee, Jr. (1843–1914), who served as Captain of the Rockbridge Artillery and who married twice; and Mildred Childe Lee (1846–1905), who died unmarried.
