= Anne Carter Lee =

Daughter of Robert E. Lee (1839–1862)

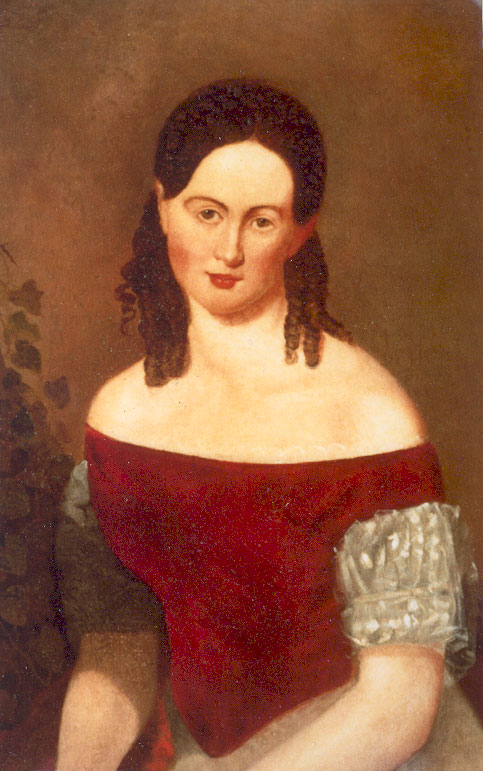
- undated portrait
- Born: June 18, 1839; Arlington Plantation, Arlington County, Virginia, U.S.
- Died: October 20, 1862 (aged 23); Warren County, North Carolina, U.S.
- Resting place: University Chapel
- Parents: Robert E. Lee; Mary Anna Custis Lee
- Relatives: Lee family

Anne Carter Lee (June 18, 1839 – October 20, 1862) was the fourth child and second daughter of General Robert E. Lee and Mary Anna Custis Lee. She grew up at Arlington House on her family's plantation. During the American Civil War, she stayed with relatives at Ravensworth Plantation and White House Plantation. Along with her mother and sisters, she was placed under house arrest by Union troops in 1861 before being permitted to cross over Confederate lines to join her father in Richmond. Lee suffered from various health conditions throughout her life and died of typhoid fever at the age of twenty-three. She was buried in Warren County, North Carolina, where she died. In 1994, her body was interred at University Chapel of Washington and Lee University in Lexington, Virginia. The Anne Carter Lee Monument stands at her original gravesite in Warrenton.

== Biography ==
Anne Carter Lee was born on June 18, 1839, at Arlington Plantation in Virginia. She was the fourth child and second daughter of Robert E. Lee and Mary Anna Custis Lee. Lee was named after her grandmother, Anne Hill Carter Lee, and was a member of the prominent Lee family. She was a descendant of the colonist Richard Lee I, and her paternal grandfather, Henry Lee III, served as Governor of Virginia and as a U.S. congressman. On her mother's side, Lee was a descendant of Martha Washington, Charles Calvert, 5th Baron Baltimore, and Charles II of England. She was a sister of Mary Custis Lee, Mildred Childe Lee, George Washington Custis Lee, William Henry Fitzhugh Lee, Eleanor Agnes Lee, and Robert E. Lee Jr.

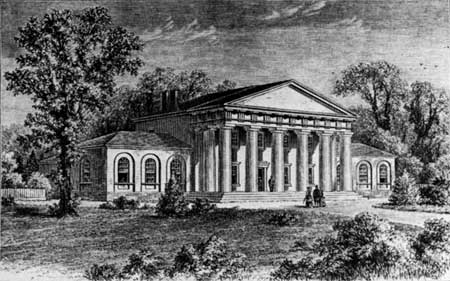
Arlington House, Lee's birthplace

Lee had a privileged upbringing typical of the planter class. A member of the American gentry, her family were one of the First Families of Virginia. She was a sickly child, often travelling around to various natural springs in Virginia with her mother in search of healing benefits. When she was seven years old, Lee suffered from an eye injury. While away at boarding school in 1857, she was sent home with an intestinal problem. Lee helped educate her younger sister, Mildred, and prepared her for life at boarding school. She also taught some of the enslaved children on her family's plantation to read and write, even though this was illegal in Virginia.

When the American Civil War broke out in 1861, Lee was sent with her sister, Agnes, to Ravensworth, their cousin's plantation in Fairfax County, Virginia. She brought along the family silver and portraits for safekeeping. That spring, she joined her mother and sister at White House, another relative's plantation along the Pamunkey River. The family were placed under house arrest by the Union Army but were released after General George B. McClellan arranged for them to be sent across Confederate lines to join Robert E. Lee in Richmond.

In August 1862 Lee contracted typhoid fever. She and Agnes moved to Jones Springs, a mineral spring in Warren County, North Carolina, in an effort to improve her health. Her state continued to decline and, after a few weeks, her mother came down from Virginia to nurse her. She died on October 20, 1862, in the presence of her mother and sister. Upon learning of her death, her father wrote, "To know that I shall never see her again on earth, that her place in our circle which I always hope one day to rejoin is forever vacant, is agonizing in the extreme." She was buried in North Carolina in the Jones family's cemetery. In 1866, a group of women had an obelisk, known as the Anne Carter Lee Monument, built at her gravesite. In 1994, members of the Lee family arranged for her remains to be brought to Lexington, Virginia, where she was reinterred in the University Chapel. The moving of her remains had been protested by local chapters of the Sons of Confederate Veterans and members of the Military Order of the Stars and Bars, who wanted the body to stay in North Carolina.
