= Eleanor Agnes Lee =

Writer and daughter of Robert E. Lee (1841–1873)

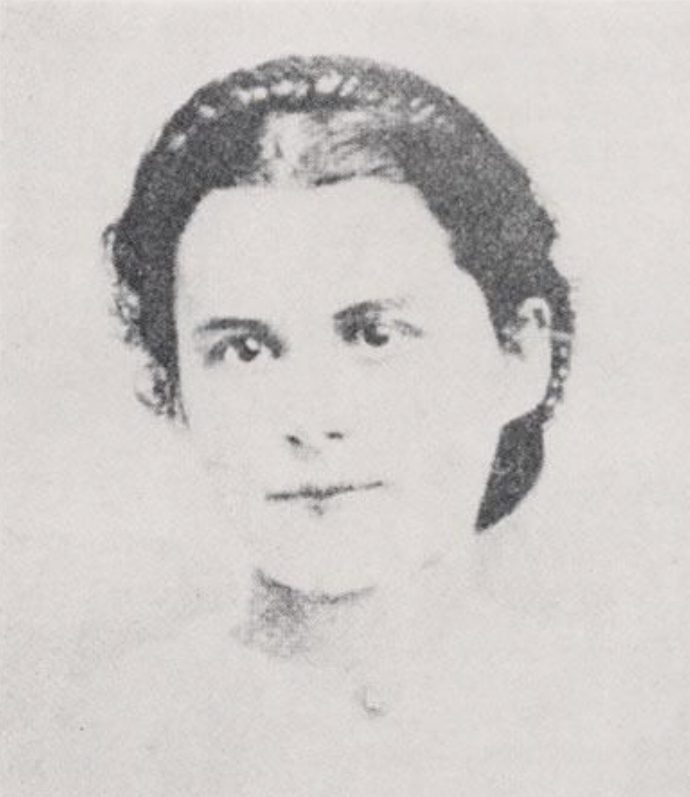
- Born: February 27, 1841; Arlington Plantation, Arlington County, Virginia, U.S.
- Died: October 15, 1873 (aged 32); Lexington, Virginia, U.S.
- Resting place: University Chapel
- Education: Virginia Female Institute
- Parents: Robert E. Lee; Mary Anna Custis Lee
- Relatives: Lee family

Eleanor Agnes Lee (February 27, 1841 – October 15, 1873) was an American diarist and poet. The fifth child of General Robert E. Lee and Mary Anna Custis Lee, she was a member of the prominent Lee family of Virginia and was affectionately called "Wiggy" and "Agnes" by her parents. In her youth, Lee kept a diary about her life at Arlington Plantation. In 1984, her diary was published posthumously under the title Growing Up in the 1850s, and was considered one of the first detailed accounts the private lives of the Lee family at Arlington. Lee also wrote poetry, often in letters to her family, inspired by real-life events including the American Civil War, the death of her favorite sister, Anne Carter Lee, and the execution of her beau and cousin, William Orton Williams.

== Early life and family ==
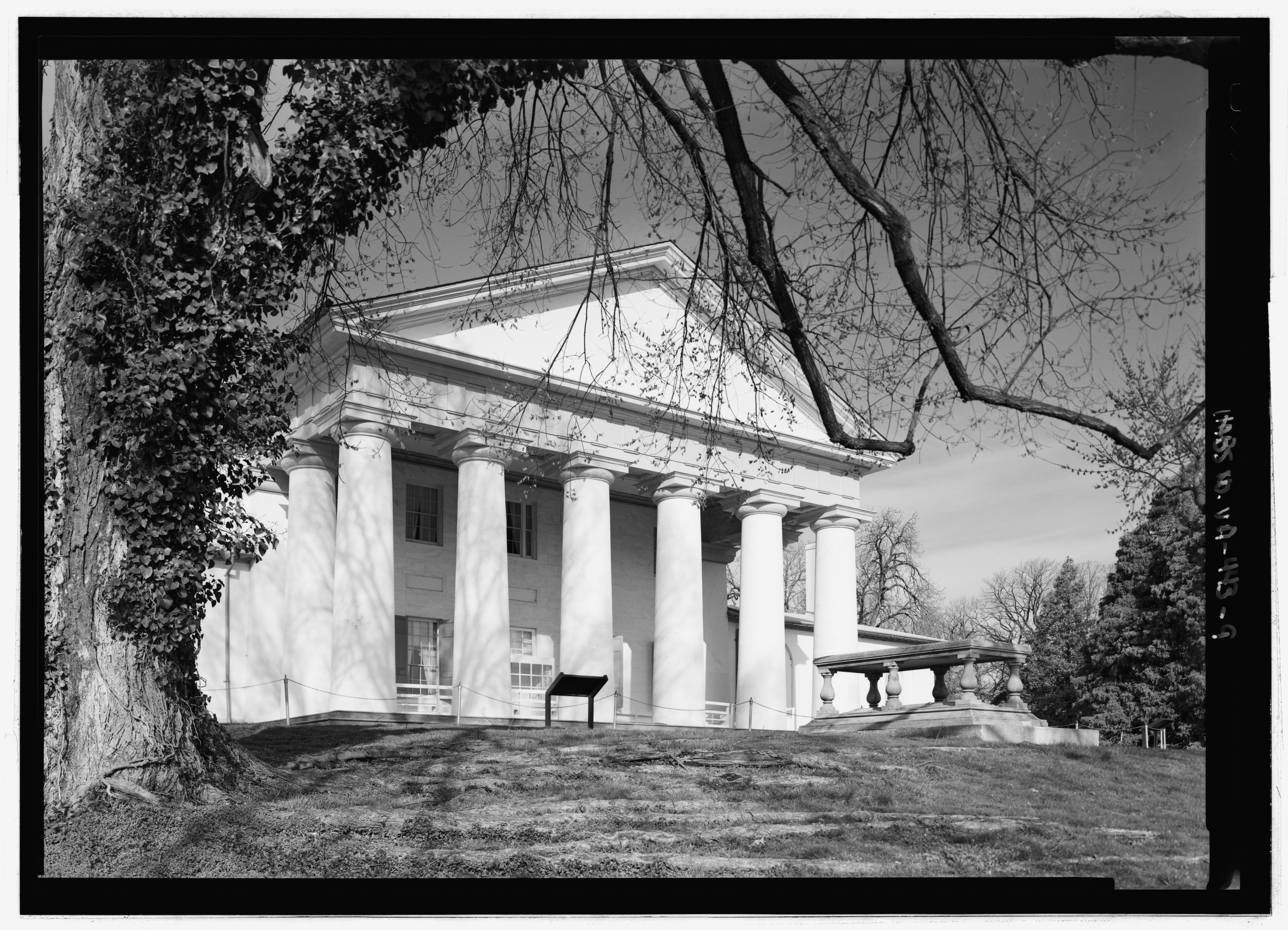
Arlington House, Lee's childhood home.

Lee was born on February 27, 1841, the fifth child and third daughter of Robert E. Lee and Mary Anna Custis Lee. She was a younger sister of George Washington Custis Lee, Mary Custis Lee, William Henry Fitzhugh Lee, and Anne Carter Lee and an older sister of Robert E. Lee Jr. and Mildred Childe Lee. Lee was a member of the prominent Lee family of Virginia, descending from American colonist Richard Lee I. Through her mother, she was a descendant of Martha Washington, Charles Calvert, 5th Baron Baltimore, and Charles II of England.

As a member of the planter class, Lee had a privileged upbringing at Arlington House on her family's plantation in Virginia. She and her sisters, who were particularly close, were doted upon by their father, who called her "Agnes" and "Wiggy". Lee was especially close to her sister Anne. She was a sickly child, and was often away from home on health trips.

She was educated at home by tutors before being sent to the Virginia Female Institute, a girl's boarding school, in 1855. A tutor, Sue Poor, taught her music, English, French, and arithmetic. One of her governesses gave her a journal for Christmas when Lee was twelve years old. She maintained the diary for five years, writing about ice skating on the canal, a visit to the family home from Washington Irving, and crossing the river with her grandfather to celebrate George Washington's birthday. Because of her diary, many details about the private family life of Arlington House are known. Her diary was later published under the title Growing Up in the 1850s. She also wrote poetry, including the poems Motherhood, A Statue in the Garden, On the Jail Steps, Peace, A Roman Doll, Her Going, and Convention.

She was confirmed in the Episcopal Church in 1857. While at home, she helped her mother and sisters teach enslaved children on their plantation, despite it being illegal to do so in Virginia.

== Adult life ==
Lee's father was against the idea of her and her sisters marrying. When Lee attended a friend's wedding, her father wrote to her saying, "I hope that this is the last wedding that you will attend." He again wrote, to a relative, "there was a great rage for matrimony, and the fever seemed to be contagious. It made me anxious to extricate Agnes", when she began helping another friend in marriage preparations. Nevertheless, she was courted by William Orton Williams, a childhood friend and cousin on her mother's side. Williams proposed to Lee, but she turned down the offer. Her father did not consider Williams to be a good match for Lee.

During the American Civil War, Lee and her sisters and mother knitted socks and gloves for Confederate soldiers and worked in hospitals for wounded soldiers. She and Anne were sent to Ravensworth, their cousin's plantation in Fairfax County, Virginia. That spring, they joined her mother and sister at White House, another relative's plantation along the Pamunkey River. The family were placed under house arrest by the Union Army but were released after General George B. McClellan arranged for them to be sent across Confederate lines to join Robert E. Lee in Richmond.

In the summer of 1861, Lee and her sister, Anne, stayed at Clydale, the summer home of Dr. Richard Stuart, in King George County, Virginia. Shortly thereafter, they made a trip to Stratford Hall, their family's seat and the birthplace of their father. In 1867, she accompanied her father and mother on a trip to Greenbrier White Sulphur Springs. In the summer of 1868 she went with her family to the Warm Springs in Bath County, Virginia. After the Civil War had ended, she moved to Lexington, Virginia with her family, where her father accepted the position as president of Washington University. During this time, she had a number of suitors, including an astronomy professor from the Virginia Military Institute, but she declined their offers for marriage.

In 1870, upon the advice of the family physicians, Lee accompanied her father on an extended trip to Georgia to help care for him. When her father died later that year, she dressed him for his funeral.

In August 1862, Anne contracted typhoid fever, and Lee moved with her to Jones Springs in Warren County, North Carolina to help her with treatment. Agnes would often climb into bed with her sister to help keep her body warm during the illness. On October 20, 1862, Anne died. Her last words were reportedly to her mother, asking "where's Agnes?" Her sister's death devastated Lee. The following year, her cousin and former beau, William Orton Williams, was executed by hanging after being convicted by the United States Army as a Confederate spy. She reportedly never recovered from his death.

== Death and burial ==
Lee died of tuberculosis in Lexington, Virginia on October 15, 1873, three years after the death of her father and just twenty-one days before the death of her mother. She is buried alongside her family in University Chapel.

== Citations ==
- Couling, Mary P. (1987). The Lee Girls. Winston-Salem: John F. Blair.
