= Mildred Childe Lee =

Society hostess and daughter of Robert E. Lee (1846–1905)

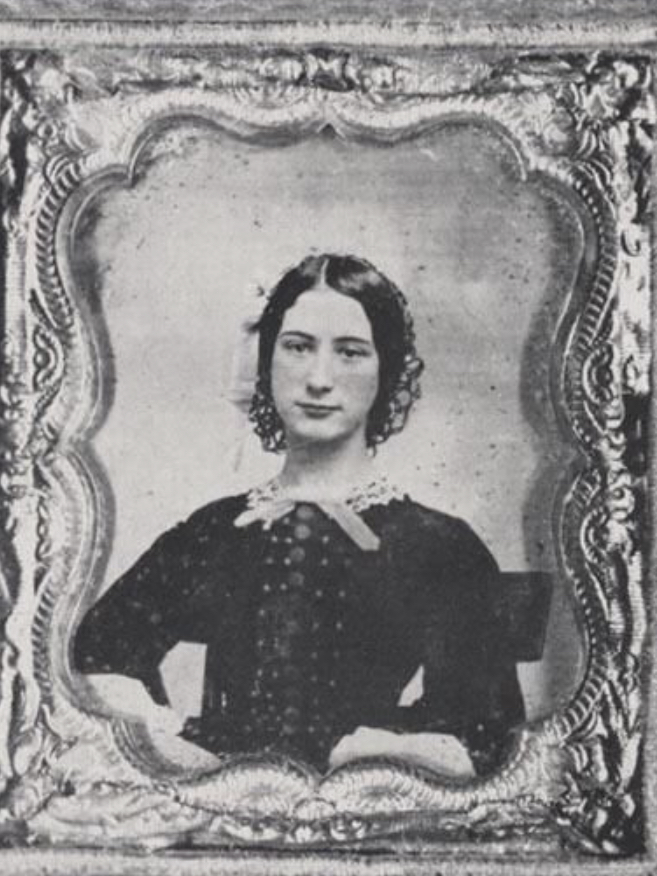
- Born: February 10, 1846; Arlington Plantation, Arlington County, Virginia, U.S.
- Died: March 27, 1905 (aged 59); New Orleans, Louisiana, U.S.
- Resting place: University Chapel
- Education: Saint Mary's School
- Parents: Robert E. Lee; Mary Anna Custis Lee
- Relatives: Lee family

Mildred Childe Lee (February 10, 1846 – March 27, 1905) was an American society hostess and the youngest child of Robert E. Lee and Mary Anna Custis Lee. She was the last member of the Lee family to be born at Arlington Plantation and had a privileged upbringing typical of members of the planter class, attending boarding schools in Winchester, Virginia, and Raleigh, North Carolina. A favorite of her father's, she was doted upon and given the nickname "Precious Life", often being referred to by this nickname in family letters. During the American Civil War, she sewed clothing for soldiers of the Confederate States Army and volunteered as a nurse in Confederate hospitals. Lee never married or had children, instead devoting her time to caring for her parents in their later years. After her father's death, she assisted her brother, George Washington Custis Lee, as hostess while he served as president of Washington College.

== Early life and family ==
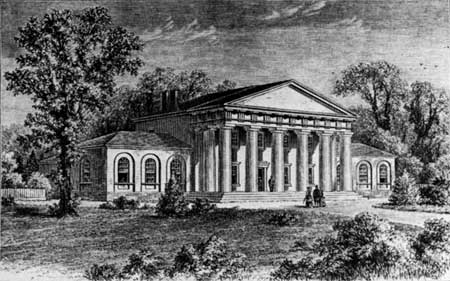
Arlington House, Lee's birthplace

Mildred Childe Lee was born on February 10, 1846, at Arlington Plantation to Robert E. Lee and Mary Anna Custis Lee. She was named after her father's sister, Catherine Mildred Lee Childe. Lee was her parents' fourth daughter and seventh child. She was the last member of the Lee family to be born at Arlington. At the time of her birth, her father was stationed at Fort Hamilton in New York City.

A member of the Lee family, she was a descendant of the colonist Richard Lee I. Her paternal grandparents, Henry Lee III and Anne Hill Carter Lee, were the ninth governor and first lady of Virginia. On her mother's side, Lee was descended from several colonial families, including the Randolph family of Virginia. Through her maternal great-grandmother, Eleanor Calvert, she descended from Charles Calvert, 5th Baron Baltimore, making her a descendant of Charles II of England. Through her grandmother, Mary Lee Fitzhugh Custis, she was a descendant of William Fitzhugh. Her maternal grandfather, George Washington Parke Custis, was George Washington's step-grandson and adopted son and the founder of Arlington House. Lee was the sister of Robert E. Lee Jr., Mary Custis Lee, Anne Carter Lee, Eleanor Agnes Lee, George Washington Custis Lee, and William Henry Fitzhugh Lee.

A member of the planter class, she had a privileged upbringing typical for American gentry. She and her siblings grew up at Arlington House, the family's plantation that had been inherited by their mother. Her childhood at Arlington was a happy one, and she spent days playing in the gardens and orchards. She was adored by her father, who nicknamed her "Precious Life". Her father once wrote her "Experience will teach you that notwithstanding all appearances to the contrary, you will never receive such a love as is felt for you by your father and mother... Your own feelings will teach you how it should be returned and appreciated." When she was three years old, the family moved to Baltimore, where her father was stationed. Her mother described her in a letter to a friend as "a most finished coquette." Later, the family moved to West Point.

== Education and the Civil War ==
Lee was tutored privately at home before being sent to Mr. and Mrs. Charles L. Powell’s Female Seminary in Winchester, Virginia, where she studied Latin, French, music, and drawing. She was then sent to Saint Mary's School, an Episcopal boarding school for girls in Raleigh, North Carolina. At Saint Mary's, Lee studied Biblical history, music, art, astronomy, Latin, and French.

When the Confederate States of America was officially formed, Lee's mother wrote to her at school, saying "With a sad and heavy heart, my dear child, I write, for the prospects before are sad indeed. And as I think both parties are in the wrong in this fractricidal war there is nothing comforting even in the hope that God may prosper the right, for I see no right in this matter. We can only pray that in His mercy He will spare us." When the Civil War broke out later that year, Mildred was sent with her sister, Annie, to meet her mother at White House Plantation, a relative's home along the Pamunkey River. Union soldiers arrived at the house and placed her and her family under house arrest. In June 1862 her father asked Union General George B. McClellan to arrange a transfer for the family across Confederate lines so that they could join him in Richmond. While her father and brothers were fighting in the war, Lee and her sisters knitted socks and gloves for Confederate soldiers, and worked as nurses in Confederate hospitals for the wounded.

== Later life and death ==
After the war ended, and Arlington was seized by the United States government, the family moved to Derwent, a cottage on the James River that had been offered to them as a residence. It was here that the family began to depend on Lee as a provider of household service, causing her to feel increasingly unhappy and unfulfilled. The family later moved to Lexington, Virginia, where her father took up the post of president of Washington College. She never married, and stayed with her parents as a companion. Though much of her time was committed to the household and social responsibilities at the college's president's house, she would go horseback riding with her father in her free time. Her father once wrote of her saying, "she is my light-bearer, the house is never dark when she is in it." After her parents' death, Lee assisted her unmarried brother, George Washington Custis Lee, as his hostess during his term as president of Washington College.

In her later years, she travelled abroad to Europe and Africa, attending the Golden Jubilee of Queen Victoria and climbing the Great Pyramid of Giza. She also travelled to Venice and France. She and her sister, Mary, attended the dedications of the Robert E. Lee Monument, Richmond and the Robert E. Lee Monument, New Orleans.

She died from a stroke on March 27, 1905, in New Orleans. Her body was taken by train to Lexington, where a delegation of Confederate Veterans and members of the United Daughters of the Confederacy awaited the arrival. She was buried in the family crypt at University Chapel. After her death, flags flew at half mast throughout the Southern United States.
