= Ann Page =

Ann Page may refer to:

- Ann Page, a grocery brand at A&P grocery stores
- Ann Randolph Meade Page (1781–1838), American Episcopal slavery reformer
- Ann Warner (c. 1908–1990), also known as Ann Page, American socialite and arts patron
