= Annefield (Boyce, Virginia) =

Historic house in Virginia, US

- U.S. National Register of Historic Places
- Virginia Landmarks Register
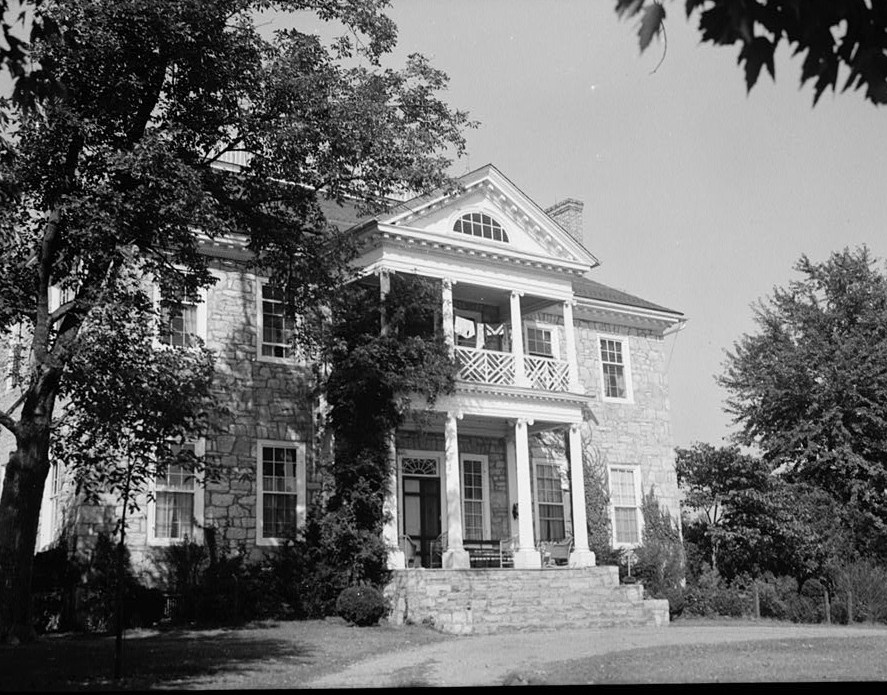
- Annefield, HABS Photo

- Location within Northern Virginia Location within Virginia Location within the United States
- Location: E of jct. of Rtes. 633 and 652, near Boyce, Virginia
- Coordinates: 39°7′54″N 78°1′29″W
- Area: 350 acres (140 ha)
- Built: c. 1790
- Built by: Page, Matthew
- Architectural style: Federal
- NRHP reference No.: 69000231
- VLR No.: 021-0002

Significant dates
- Added to NRHP: November 12, 1969
- Designated VLR: September 9, 1969

Annefield or Annfield is a historic plantation house located near Boyce, Clarke County, Virginia. Matthew Page (1762–1826) built it beginning around 1790, and named it after his new wife, Ann Randolph Meade (1781–1838), daughter of Richard Kidder Meade and sister of William Meade, whom he married in 1799.

== History ==
Matthew Page, born in Hanover County, moved with his brother to the then-frontier Frederick County (from which Clarke County later split), and became one of its wealthiest men. He acquired a plantation on the westward road near the Potomac River between Alexandria and Winchester, and expanded it to more than 2000 acres, which he operated using about 200 slaves. Following her conversion to Christianity, his wife Ann became one of the leading anti-slavery activists in the South, although her husband refused to allow her to emancipate slaves in his lifetime. Ann Meade Page's good friend Molly Custis also opposed slavery (freeing her slaves and persuading her husband George Washington Parke Custis to free the remaining slaves in his will), and her daughter Mary Custis (1808-1873), wife of Robert E. Lee, was born at Annefield during one of her mother's visits. Despite criticism from her neighbors that she was "slave to the slaves", Ann Page replaced the dormitory style slave quarters at Annefield, and taught African Americans at the plantation, even those not enslaved there. Both women were active in the American Colonization Society, and Rev. Charles Wesley Andrews (who came from Vermont to assist at the local parish and became active in that society), married Page's daughter Sarah.

Matthew Page's extensive will and codicil written shortly before his death in 1826 divided the slaves by families among his wife, daughter Sarah, nephews John W. and William B. Page and niece Sarah W. Brooke, with the balance of the estate to be given by its administrator William Byrd Page to Matthew Page's daughters Sarah and Mary (for whom William Meade served as guardian) and their issue. Ann Page received some money from the estate (from collecting debts owed it as well as selling slaves and other property) in 1829 to care for elderly slaves. Between 1832 and her 1838 death, she sent three groups of slaves (34 people) from Annefield to Liberia, and gave others the option of going to Liberia in her will, for which Rev. Andrews was executor.

After Ann Page's death, Annefield was sold to Thomas Carter. His son William Page Carter (b. 1840-19??) became a captain in the Confederate Light Artillery. Wounded at the Battle of Seven Pines outside Richmond, he began writing poetry, at first under a pseudonym, and later married Lucy Page of Philadelphia and lived in Washington, D.C. His book Echoes from the Glen in Divers Keys (1905) is available from the Internet Archive.

== Architecture ==
The two-story, stone mansion is seven bays by four bays, with a hipped roof. The central door is flanked by narrow windows and has a two-level pedimented porch supported by Roman Ionic columns. Later a 1 1/2-story, stuccoed frame rear ell was added. It features a considerable carved interior woodwork, including modillioned cornice and balustraded deck, as well as four interior end chimneys. Also on the property is a contributing kitchen building.

It was listed on the National Register of Historic Places in 1969.
