= William Henry Fitzhugh =

American politician (1792–1830)

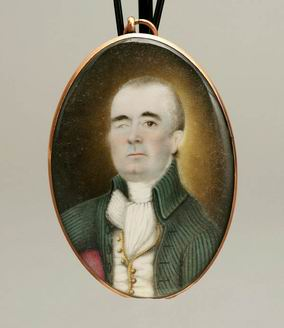

Member of the Virginia House of Delegates from Fairfax County
- In office December 1, 1828 – December 6, 1829 Serving with Thomas Moss
- Preceded by: George Chichester
- Succeeded by: James Sangster

Member of the Virginia Senate from Loudoun and Fairfax Counties
- In office December 2, 1821 – November 30, 1823
- Succeeded by: William M. McCarty

Member of the Virginia Senate from Loudoun, Fauquier and Fairfax Counties
- In office December 6, 1819 – December 1, 1821
- Preceded by: John Love

Member of the Virginia House of Delegates from Fairfax County
- In office December 2, 1811 – November 11, 1816 Serving with Charles Julian, Daniel Carroll Brent, Hancock Eustace
- Preceded by: William Brent
- Succeeded by: Alexander F. Rose

Personal details
- Born: March 9, 1792 Chatham Manor, Stafford County, Virginia
- Died: May 21, 1830 (aged 38) Fairfax, Virginia, U.S.
- Resting place: Pohick Church Cemetery; Lorton, Virginia, U.S.
- Spouse: Anna Maria Sarah Goldsborough

William Henry Fitzhugh (March 9, 1792 – May 21, 1830) was Virginia planter and politician who served in both houses of the Virginia General Assembly, as well as in the Virginia constitutional convention of 1829–1830 and as an officer of the American Colonization Society.

== Early and family life ==
Coat of arms of William Fitzhugh

William Henry Fitzhugh was born at Chatham, in Stafford County, Virginia. His father, William Fitzhugh, owned extensive estates throughout northern Virginia, and served in the Virginia House of Burgesses, the Virginia House of Delegates, and the Second Continental Congress. He had two sisters, Anna Randolph Fitzhugh Craik (1783–1806) and Mary Lee Fitzhugh Custis. Mary Lee was a noted Episcopalian lay leader and the mother of Mary Anna Randolph Custis Lee. He also had two stepsisters.

William Henry Fitzhugh married Anna Maria Sarah Goldsborough (1796–1874), daughter of prominent Maryland lawyer and politician Charles Goldsborough, who survived him, but the couple had no children.

== Career ==
Fitzhugh owned a townhouse in Alexandria, Virginia, and built a house on a Fairfax County plantation the Fitzhugh family had owned since 1694 called Ravensworth. Fitzhugh had inherited more than 7000 acres (and his sisters approximately 800 acres apiece). Like his father, he was one of Fairfax County's largest landowners as well as slaveowners in 1810, when he owned 242 slaves in the county. In 1813 he advertised 70 or 80 slaves for sale at the Fairfax Courthouse, and 1818 advertised 2000 acres of the Ravensworth plantation for sale, along with a large brick building in Alexandria. By 1820, his slaveholdings in Fairfax county had dropped significantly, but were still large, at 158 slaves.

Fairfax County voters repeatedly elected Fitzhugh as one of their representatives in the Virginia House of Delegates, beginning in 1811, although he also lost several times (or did not stand for election). Fairfax County voters joined with those from neighboring Loudoun and Fauquier Counties to elect Fitzhugh to the Virginia Senate (although the district was redrawn following the 1820 census and Fauquier County instead joined with Culpeper County). Fitzhugh last represented Fairfax County in the House of Delegates during the 1828-1829 session, alongside single-term delegate Thomas Moss.

Fitzhugh's last legislative service was at the Virginia constitutional convention of 1829–1830, where he joined Richard R. Henderson, Charles Fenton Mercer, and James Monroe in representing the district comprising Fairfax and Loudoun Counties. He generally supported democratic reforms and voted against final adoption of the new constitution because in his view it did not go far enough in instituting needed reforms.

== Death and legacy ==
Fitzhugh died in 1830, before the federal census count. His will bequeathed 1,300 acres to his adopted daughter Mary Caroline Goldsborough, with the remainder to his widow Anna Goldsborough for her lifetime, and later to his niece Mary Randolph Custis. His widow survived the American Civil War; she then bequeathed most of her property to children of CSA General Robert E. Lee (Mary Randolph Custis' husband). Both William Henry Fitzhugh and his wife are now buried in the cemetery of historic Pohick Church in Lorton.
