= Mary Custis Lee =

Daughter of Robert E. Lee (1835–1918)

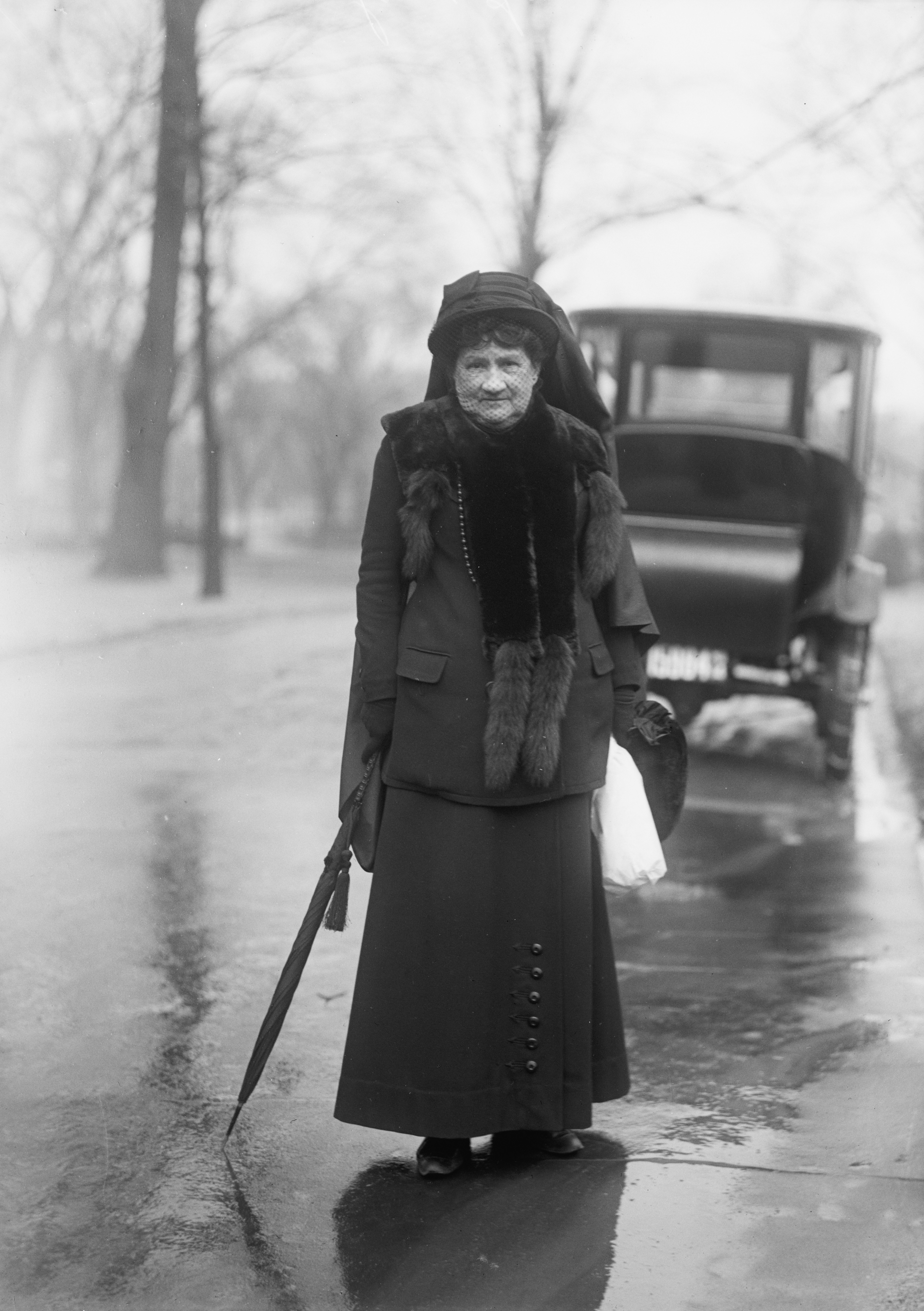
- Lee in 1914
- Born: July 12, 1835; Arlington Plantation, Arlington County, Virginia, U.S.
- Died: November 22, 1918 (aged 83); Hot Springs, Virginia, U.S.
- Resting place: University Chapel
- Parents: Robert E. Lee; Mary Anna Custis Lee
- Relatives: Lee family

Mary Custis Lee (July 12, 1835 – November 22, 1918) was an American heiress and the eldest daughter of Confederate States Army General Robert E. Lee and Mary Anna Custis Lee. Throughout the American Civil War and Reconstruction era, she remained distant from her family. Spending much of her time traveling, she did not attend the funerals for her sisters nor those for her parents. Somewhat eccentric, she used her inheritance from the sale of Arlington House to fund trips abroad. She spent time in the United Kingdom, Italy, France, Russia, Monaco, Ottoman Empire, Ceylon, the Dutch East Indies, Palestine, Egypt, Sudan, Australia, China, India, Japan, Mexico, and Venezuela. During her travels, she used her social status as the daughter of Robert E. Lee to obtain audiences with foreign royalty, nobility, and political leaders including Queen Victoria, Pope Leo XIII, and an Indian maharaja.

In 1902, while in Alexandria, Virginia, she was arrested for refusing to sit in the whites-only section of a segregated streetcar, opting instead to sit with her black maid. Her arrest was controversial, and used by some as a symbol for desegregation, although historians debate what her intentions were for refusing to change seats. Afterward, she left for France, where she lived until the outbreak of World War I.

== Early life and family ==
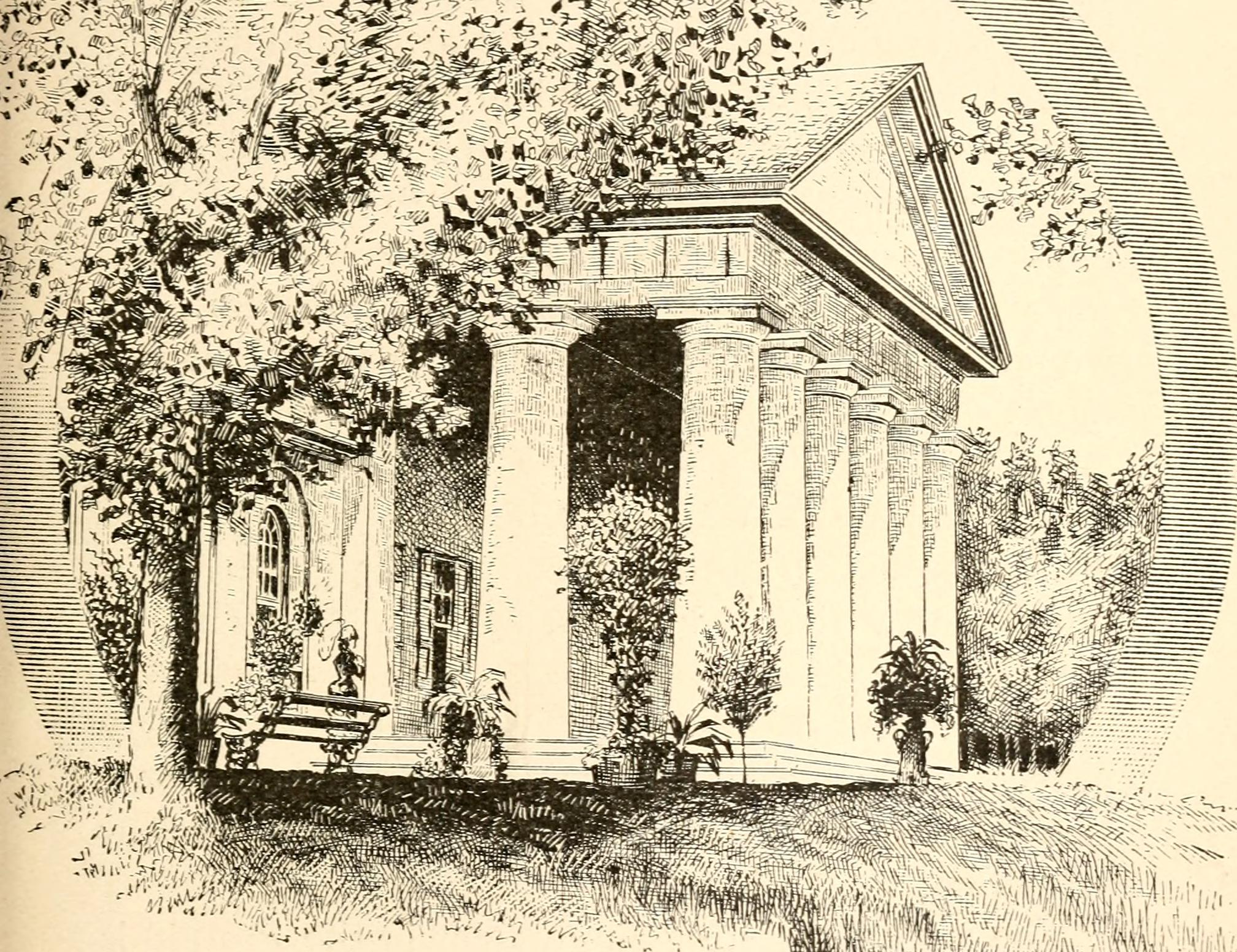
Arlington House, Lee's birthplace and childhood home.

Lee was born on July 12, 1835, the second child and first daughter of Robert E. Lee and Mary Anna Custis Lee, at Arlington Plantation in Arlington County, Virginia. She was named after her mother. She was one of seven children, and was the sister of George Washington Custis Lee, William Henry Fitzhugh Lee, Anne Carter Lee, Eleanor Agnes Lee, Robert E. Lee Jr., and Mildred Childe Lee. A member of the prominent Lee family of Virginia, she descended from American colonist Richard Lee I. Through her mother, Lee was a descendant of Martha Washington through her first marriage to Daniel Parke Custis, and also descended from Charles Calvert, 5th Baron Baltimore and Charles II of England.

As an infant, Lee was nicknamed "Mee" by her father, and was later called "Daughter" by her family after she turned thirteen. Her childhood bedroom at Arlington had been used by Gilbert du Motier, Marquis de Lafayette when he visited the home in 1824. When she was five years old, her parents and brothers moved to St. Louis, and Lee stayed behind at Arlington with her grandparents, George Washington Parke Custis and Mary Lee Fitzhugh Custis. She did not spend much time at home in her youth, instead traveling to visit family friends and extended family members.

== Adult life ==
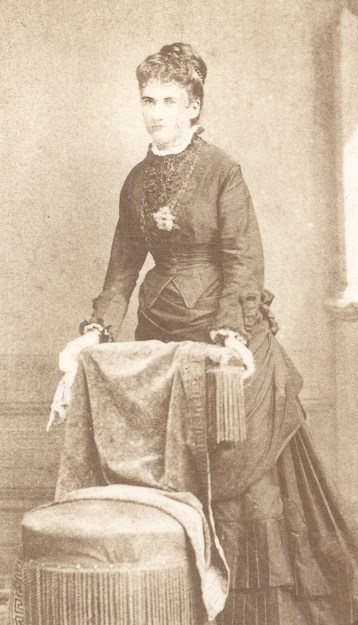
A younger Mary Custis Lee

During the American Civil War, Lee was stuck behind Union lines and was unable to travel to Richmond to attend her sister's funeral in 1862. Her former beau, General J.E.B. Stuart, sent Confederate scouts to rescue her, but she refused to leave. After the war ended, Lee's family moved to a house in Powhatan County, Virginia, but she chose not to go with them, instead traveling to visit relatives in Staunton. In the summer of 1865, while staying in Staunton, Lee attended a party where she met Colonel Bolivar Christian, who was a trustee of Washington College (now Washington and Lee University) in Lexington. She told Christian about her father's yearning for employment, after which he offered her father the position as president of the college.

She did not return home for her father's funeral in 1870, nor did she return for the funerals of her mother and sister, Agnes, in 1873. Her youngest sister, Mildred, grew bitter towards her and their relationship remained strained for the rest of their lives, owing to Lee's having stayed away from the family during difficult times. In 1884 she attended the unveiling of a statue of her father in New Orleans and, in 1890 attended another statue unveiling in Richmond.

After her brother, George, sold Arlington House, Lee used her share of the profit to spend the majority of the remainder of her life abroad. She traveled to twenty-six countries and went on international cruises. During her time abroad, Lee dined with the Governor-General of the Dutch East Indies, was a guest of an Indian maharaja, met Queen Victoria and Pope Leo XIII, and sat with American diplomats at formal dinners in Tokyo and Rome. She gambled in Monaco, traveled across Russia without a tour guide, and bribed her way into Hagia Sophia in Constantinople. Lee also traveled to Atlantic City, Egypt, Australia, Mexico, Ceylon, Palestine, Venezuela, China, and Khartoum.

In 1902, Lee returned to the United States and was arrested on June 13 in Alexandria for riding in the back of a streetcar with her black maid, having refused to move to the whites-only section at the front of the car. Her arrest was controversial, and historians have argued about what her intentions were for refusing to change seats. She posted bond and was ordered to appear in court, but ignored the order.

In 1906, Lee donated George Washington's military tents for a benefit sale to raise funds for the Home for Needy Confederate Women in Richmond. The tents were part of a group of family heirlooms confiscated by the Union Army and restored to the family in 1901.

In the late 1800s, Lee left for France. Upon hearing of the death of her sister, Mildred, in 1905, she did not return to the United States. She finally came home in 1914 due to the start of World War I.

Lee died in Hot Springs, Virginia on November 22, 1918. Her body was cremated and the ashes were placed in the family crypt in University Chapel.
