= White House (plantation) =

White House Plantation
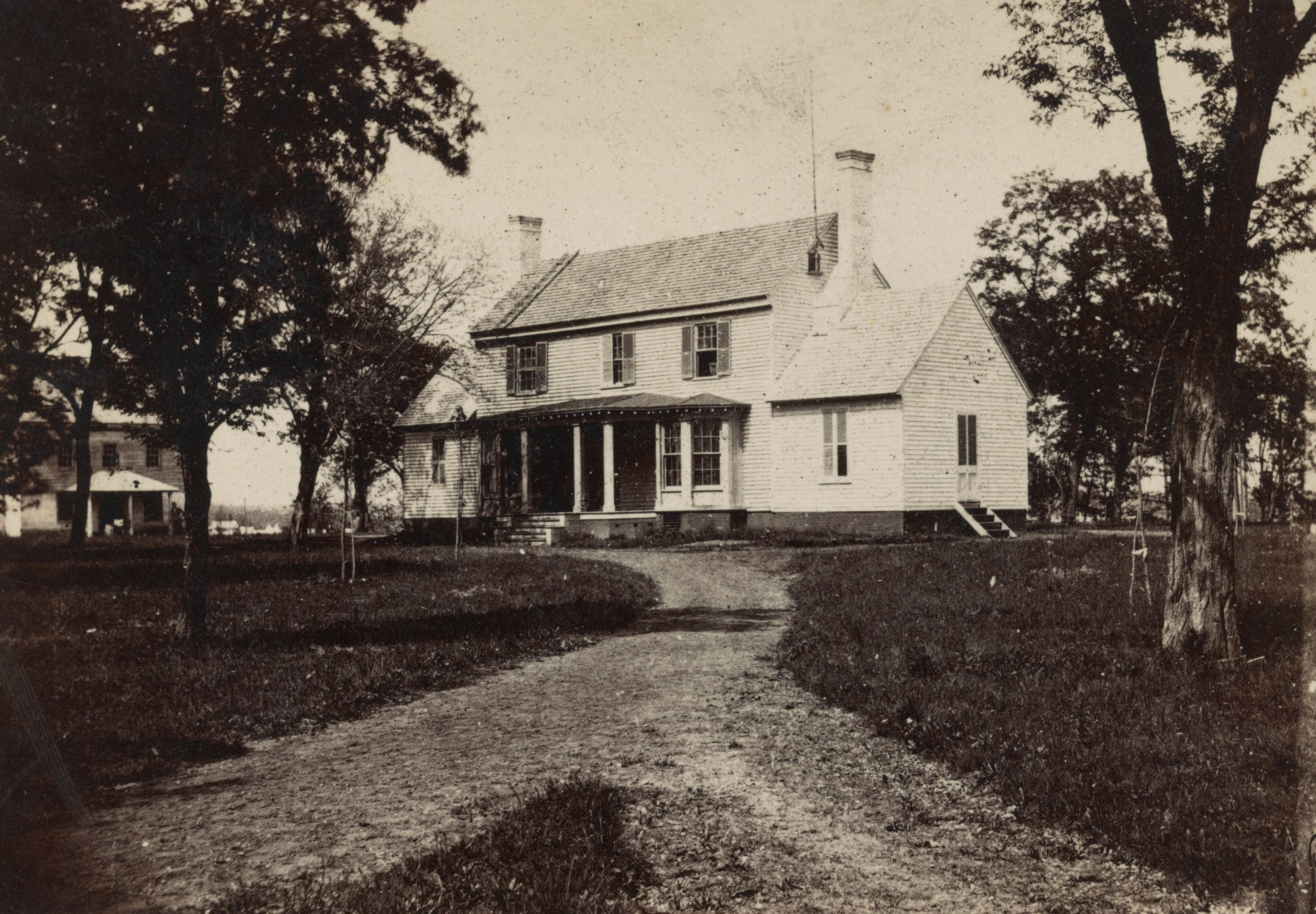
- White House plantation, 1862
- Interactive map of the White House Plantation area

General information
- Type: Private residence
- Architectural style: Georgian
- Location: New Kent County, Virginia, United States
- Coordinates: 37°34′31.142″N 77°1′43.477″W
- Construction started: Late 17th Century
- Destroyed: 1862; 1875
- Owner: Col. John Lightfoot III; Goodrich Lightfoot; John Custis; Daniel Parke Custis; Martha Washington; John Parke Custis; George Washington Parke Custis; William Henry Fitzhugh Lee

The White House was a late 17th-century plantation on the Pamunkey River near White House in New Kent County, Virginia. There were a total of three White Houses all built on the original pre-1700 foundation. The original White House Mansion was built by Colonel John Lightfoot III just before 1700 and while he was Counselor of State.

The White House Plantation was part of a large land holding that John Custis, father of Daniel Parke Custis, purchased from the family of John Lightfoot III. After John Custis died, he left the White House Plantation to his son Daniel Parke Custis, the first husband of Martha Dandridge Custis. The two would marry on May 15, 1750. Daniel Parke Custis would unexpectedly die in 1757, leaving the White House Plantation to his wife. After the death of her first husband, Martha Dandridge Custis would later meet George Washington and on January 6, 1759 would hold their wedding ceremony in one of the rooms of the White House Mansion.

Union troops stationed at the White House Plantation (of the Army of the Potomac) under the command of George B. McClellan, would burn the second White House to the ground on June 28, 1862, as they retreated during the Seven Days Battles. The third and final White House burned in 1880. The three White Houses collectively spanned over 180 years. The 2nd and 3rd iterations were smaller than the original White House Mansion.

== History ==
=== Prior to the Custis Family ===
Following the Third Anglo-Powhatan War, the General Assembly began setting up Forts along York River and its tributaries (which are known now as the Pamunkey and Mattaponi Rivers). Captain Roger Marshall was to manage Fort Royal (also known as Rickahock), for three years. After fulfilling the requirements he was granted a patent for the 600 acres of Rickahock (including Fort Royal and any buildings within), on March 14, 1649. That same day he sold these 600 acres of Rickahock to General Manwarring Hammond. These 600 acres brought Gen. Hammond's total landholding patents to 3760 acres on the south side of York River.

On the same day as Gen. Hammond received the 600 acres of Rickahock from Capt. Marshall, Colonel Philip Honeywood was granted a patent of 3050 acres. This included 1550 acres above Warrannucock Island (now known as the Pamunkey Indian Reservation) and 1500 acres south side of the York River near the Island.

Together the tracts of land owned by Gen. Hammond and Col. Honeywood spanned six square miles. Both men were Royalist Officers who had originally fled England to escape Oliver Cromwell. Once the Restoration came, they left Virginia for home.

After leaving for England, the two tracts of land were later conveyed to Captain William Bassett on January 23, 1670 through his correspondence with Colonel Henry Norwood. While the deeds had been lost due to a fire that destroyed New Kent County records, it is thought that Colonel John Lightfoot III purchased the lands from the William Bassett Estate around 1686, after he arrived from England with his wife Anne (Goodrich) Lightfoot. Col. John Lightfoot III constructed the White House Mansion prior to 1700. "The house was a commodious one, with adequate room for entertainment of a large gathering and guests such as could be provided for by a large Colonial Plantation which had servants aplenty and provisions of all kinds".

Following Col. John Lightfoot III's death in 1709, his landholdings were divided amongst his sons: Sherwood Lightfoot, Goodrich Lightfoot, and Thomas Lightfoot. According to the diary of Col. William Byrd, there he mentioned Sherwood Lightfoot resided at Rickahock (the southern portion and originally part of Fort Royal) and his younger brother, Goodrich Lightfoot, at the White House Plantation (the northern portion) where the White House Mansion was located. It is unknown what portions of John Lightfoot III's estate went to his youngest son Thomas Lightfoot, and whether any property was given to Col. John Lightfoot's daughter Alice Lightfoot.

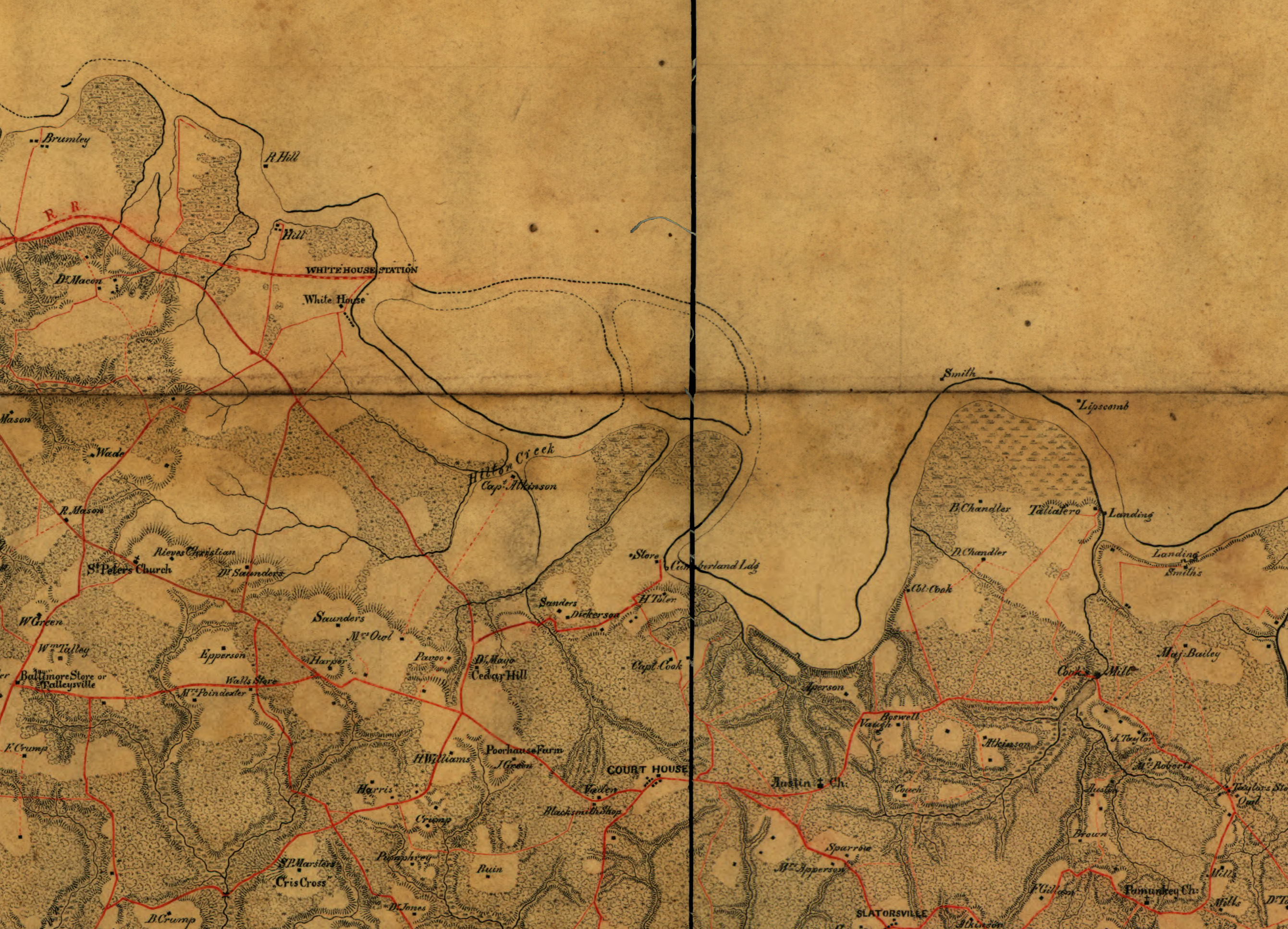
Location of the White House can be seen on this map along the Pamunkey River. This map from 1863 includes the area in which the White House Plantation is located as well as the 6 square miles of land that the Lightfoots conveyed to the Custis family in the 1700s.

John Lightfoot III's total landholdings included acreage he had acquired from William Bassett’s estate. Specifically Anthony Langston’s plantation, Gen. Hammond’s Fort Royal tract, and land to the east of Manquin Creek.

Sherwood Lightfoot would die April 20, 1730. In 1727 Goodrich Lightfoot moved from the White House Plantation to Spotsylvania County and later died in 1738 while living in Orange County. While the records had been lost both Goodrich Lightfoot and Sherwood Lightfoot would convey the entire property of John Lightfoot III to Colonel John Custis (father to Daniel Parke Custis). As of 1735 there are records showing Col. John Custis owned the Old Quarter and the land upon the river.

=== Antebellum years ===
A wealthy widow, Martha Custis was courted by George Washington, whom she married in 1759. Shortly thereafter, he resigned his Virginia military commission and they moved to his plantation at Mount Vernon in Fairfax County overlooking the Potomac River.

George Washington had no children, but his wife, the widowed Martha Dandridge Custis Washington had children from her first marriage to Daniel Parke Custis. Her son, John Parke "Jacky" Custis (1754–1781) married Eleanor Calvert on February 3, 1774. The couple then moved to the White House plantation in New Kent County, Virginia. John Parke Custis soon purchased the Abingdon plantation, where they moved in 1778.

John Parke Custis died in 1781 after contracting "camp fever" at the Siege of Yorktown. His two youngest children became wards of his mother, Martha Dandridge Custis Washington and her husband George Washington. Eleanor Parke Custis (later Lewis) and six-month old George Washington Parke Custis (1781–1857) were never adopted by them. Martha's grandchildren lived with their guardians at Mount Vernon.

George Washington was the first President of the United States. His wife Martha was known as "Lady Washington." The honorary title of First Lady was invented years later.

The ward of George and Martha Washington, George Washington Parke Custis began construction on Arlington House, then in the District of Columbia in 1802. He intending it to become a memorial to George Washington, who had died in 1799. Arlington House later became the home of his daughter, Mary Anna Randolph Custis, born in 1807, who in 1831 married Robert E. Lee. In 1846, most of the area of the District of Columbia south of the Potomac River was retroceded to Virginia, including the land occupied by Arlington House and the surrounding plantation.

Robert Edward Lee and his wife Mary Anna Randolph Custis Lee had seven children, of whom three boys and three girls survived to adulthood. Of these, the second son was William H.F. "Rooney" Lee (1837–1891), who was born at Arlington House. Rooney Lee was educated at Harvard University, and then followed his father's footsteps into service with the U.S. Army. However, in 1859, he resigned his commission.

Rooney Lee moved to White House Plantation, which he had inherited from his grandfather, who died in 1857. He married Charlotte Wickham, a descendant of attorney John Wickham. They had two children, a boy and a girl, who both died in infancy. His wife, Charlotte, died in 1863. The plantation house at White House Plantation, which was burned in 1862, had been the second of three which occupied the site over the years, all destroyed by fires.

White House was the site of the crossing of the Pamunkey River of the Richmond and York River Railroad, which was completed in 1861 between Richmond and West Point, where the Pamunkey and the Mattaponi Rivers converge to form the York River.

=== American Civil War years ===
When the U.S. Civil War broke out in 1861, Virginia joined the newly formed Confederate States of America. The historical home of Daniel Parke Custis and Martha Dandridge Custis (later Washington) was destroyed by Union troops in 1862. Martha's son, John Parke Custis had left the property to his son, George Washington Parke Custis who left it in his will to his grandson, William Henry Fitzhugh Lee through his daughter, Mary Ann Randolph Custis Lee who had married a career soldier, Robert Edward Lee.

The Lee couple never owned the White House plantation, and Robert E. Lee never owned her Custis family home, Arlington House in northern Virginia. Just before the war, Robert E. Lee was the superintendent of the U.S. Military Academy at West Point. As a career U.S. Army officer, Lee was offered command of all Union forces by U.S. President Abraham Lincoln. After thinking about it overnight at his wife's family home at Arlington House near Washington City, Lee resigned his commission to fight for his home state of Virginia. All three of his sons joined him in military service for the Confederacy.

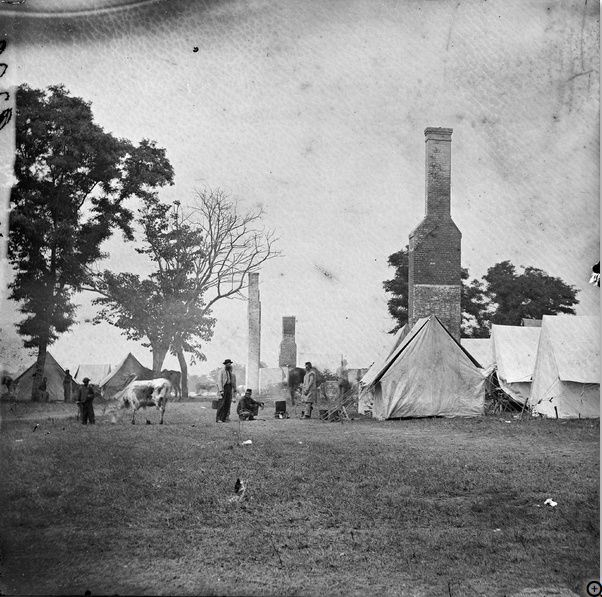
Ruins of White House Plantation

Unfortunately, Mary Ann Randolph Custis Lee suffered from rheumatoid arthritis that became increasingly debilitating with advancing age. By 1861, she was using a wheelchair. Her son, William Henry Fitzhugh "Rooney" Lee had inherited the White House plantation from her father, George Washington Parke Custis. Mrs. Mary Ann Randolph Custis Lee and her daughters traveled from Arlington House to the White House when the war began. Union troops under the command of General George B. McClellan took White House Landing to use as a supply base during the Peninsula Campaign in 1862. General McClellan then made arrangements for Mrs. Robert Lee's safe passage through the Union lines to Richmond, where she lived at 707 E. Franklin Street (still-extant house) for the rest of the War.

During the Peninsula Campaign, Frederick Law Olmsted, designer of New York City's Central Park among his many accomplishments, served as Executive Secretary of the U.S. Sanitary Commission, a precursor to the Red Cross in Washington D.C. which tended to the Union wounded during the Civil War. Olmsted headed the medical effort for the sick and wounded at White House Landing until McClellan abandoned it as he retreated with his troops during the Seven Days Battles and shifted his base to Harrison's Landing on the James River. The White House was burned by retreating Union troops. This was not the original White House Mansion. The original White House Mansion built by Col. John Lightfoot III had been removed to "make way for the structure which stood on the same site and burned on June 27, 1862".

=== Postbellum years ===
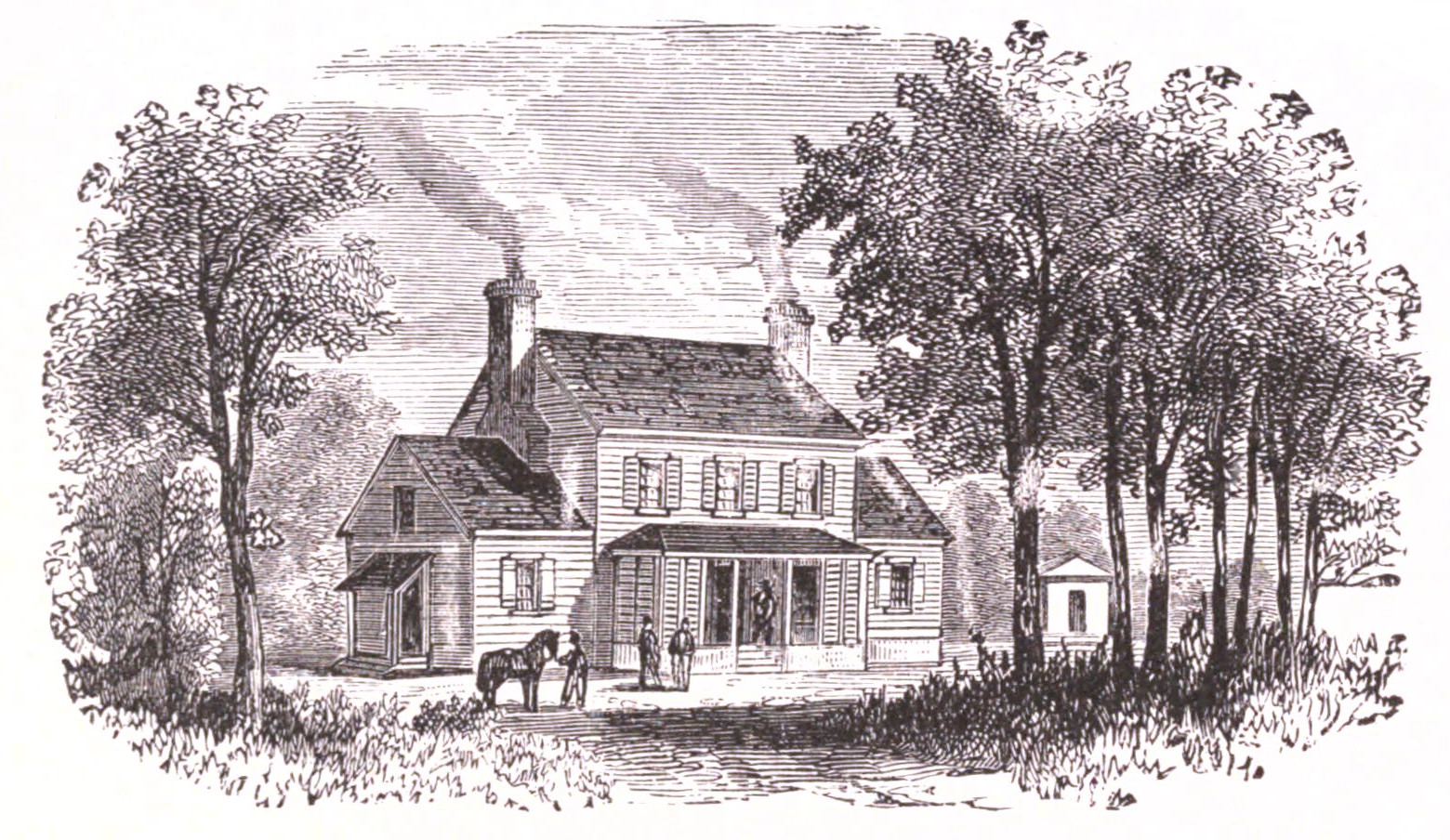
White House as it appeared when rebuilt after the American Civil War

William Henry Fitzhugh "Rooney" Lee lost his wife and children during the War. He was captured and held as a prisoner-of-war in New York after the Battle of Brandy Station. Following the War, Rooney Lee returned to White House Plantation. In 1867, he married again. With his second wife, Mary Tab Bolling Lee, he had several children. Nearby, his younger brother Rob lived at Romancoke Plantation across the river in King William County.

After his mother died in 1873, Rooney inherited the Ravensworth Estate, the old Fitzhugh family property (near present-day Springfield) in Fairfax County with 563 acres (2.28 km^{2}) of land. In 1874, he moved there from White House Plantation.

Rooney Lee was elected to the Virginia Senate in 1875, serving until 1878. He was then elected as a Democrat to the US House of Representatives in 1887. He served in the House until his death at Ravensworth in 1891. He is interred in the Lee Chapel at Washington and Lee University in Lexington, Virginia with his parents and siblings.

Following the Civil War and the burning of the White House Mansion, another similar house was built upon the same foundation. This would be the third and final White House built at the plantation. This house subsequently burned in 1880.

== US Park Service Excavation in 1935 ==
A 1935 excavation by the United States Park Service discovered "traces of three different houses on the same foundations." These included the original White House Mansion, the second that burned down during the Civil War on 27 June 1862, and the third that burned in 1880. The oldest bricks were laid in English Bond and were from before 1700.

== The Other White House (the U.S. President's House) in Washington, D.C. ==
Located in the town named for the first U.S. president, Washington City, the governmental mansion of U.S. presidents is called the White House. Construction began during the first president's term in office, but President George Washington and his wife Lady (Martha) Washington never lived there. It is speculated by some people that the name may have derived from White House Plantation.

"It was called White House out of respect for Mrs. Washington's [and her first husband Daniel Parke Custis'] home in Virginia, in which her wedding[s] occurred... Washington had pleasant memories of that residence and suggested the building of a White House for Presidents." "The truth of these statements can be substantiated, that it was called the White House before the War of 1812, but that it was so called as an honor to the White House on the Pamunkey is a very dubious statement. It was a White House and is to this day."

Martha Dandridge Custis took care of George Washington at her house when he was suddenly ill before they began courting. He met her on his way to work at the House of Burgesses in Williamsburg, Virginia. He met her again on his return. George Washington did not live in Martha's house. She moved to Mount Vernon after they married.

== Location of the White House Mansion ==
The location of the White House Mansion can be found on Google Maps. Based on the aerial image of the area it would appear that an excavation site can be seen.
