= Ann Randolph Meade Page =

1781–1838, Episcopal slavery reformer

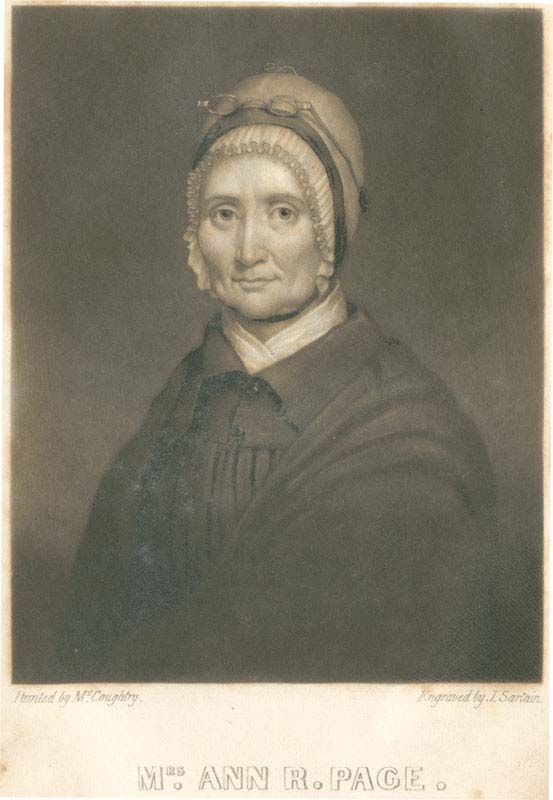
The painting was determined to have been painted by James Toole by the Virginia Museum of Fine Arts of Richmond. The image was used on the cover of the book written by her son-in-law Charles W. Andrews entitled Memoir of Mrs. Anne R. Page that was published in 1844.

Ann Randolph Meade Page (Note: She was also known as Anne Randolph Meade Page, Ann or Anne Randolph Page, and Ann R. Page.) (December 3, 1781 – March 28, 1838) was an American Episcopal slavery reformer. She was raised in her birth family with slaves and her husband was among the largest slaveholders in Frederick County, Virginia. She did not believe in slavery, and while she was unable to free slaves, she focused on improving their conditions by teaching them to read and write, Christianity, a wide range of domestic skills and trades. After the founding of the American Colonization Society and, after the death of her husband, she emancipated enslaved people and prepared them to leave the United States for the colony of Liberia in West Africa, where they and their family members would live free.

== Early life ==
Ann Randolph Meade, born December 3, 1781, was the daughter of widow Mary Fitzhugh Grymes Randolph (Note: Mary Fitzhugh Grymes Randolph was the wife of William Randolph.) and Col. Richard Kidder Meade, General George Washington's aide-de-camp. She was born at "Chatham Manor" in Stafford County, Virginia, near Fredericksburg, Virginia. Page grew up at a plantation called "Lucky Hit". The plantation was originally in Frederick County, but is now in Clarke County, Virginia.

She received academic and religion lessons from her mother, who was an Evangelical Christian. Although she was a member of the educated gentry, her mother taught her the "importance of self-denial, simple living and service to slaves in contrast to what the gentry sought—a fashionable living reminiscent of the English nobility with servants to indulge their needs," according to biographer Arthur Dicken Thomas. She also learned from her mother that "your guests see your well-spread table, but God sees in the negro cabin". The family acted on their beliefs by living a simple life and were charitable to those in need.

Page was the first of eight children born between 1781 and 1796. Her siblings are Richard, William (who died in his year of birth), Susanna, William, David, Mary, and Lucy. Her brother, William Meade, became a bishop and promoted "a conversion experience followed by a personal relationship with God, a life of moral discipline, identification with the evangelical community, missionary enterprise, and religious reform."

== Personal life ==
She married Matthew Page on March 23, 1799. He was a member of the Virginia House of Delegates and a planter with a 2,000 acre plantation in Berryville, Virginia with approximately 200 slaves. He built a manor in Boyce, Virginia and named it Annefield for his bride.

The Pages had a daughter, Sarah Walker Page. In 1833, she married Charles Wesley Andrews. Andrews was inspired by Ann's brother William to become a bishop in 1832. Andrews believed that slavery was a sin. He promoted manumission of slaves, settlement of freed African Americans to Liberia, and lived according to strict evangelical doctrine. Sarah and Charles were active members of the American Colonization Society. Andrews published the Memoir of Mrs. Anne R. Page in 1844. The Andrews had two daughters and one son.

== Slavery reformer ==
Page became depressed after she was married. She had a hard time managing the depth of the difference between being one of the largest slaveholders in Frederick County, Virginia and believing that no person should be enslaved. She felt that she was called by God to eradicate "the evil power of slavery", particularly in her own household. Because she was unable to end slavery, she woke up every moment in despair and fell asleep in fear. In 1816, her spirit was lifted with the creation of the American Colonization Society.

Notwithstanding that she was among the largest slaveholders in Frederick County, Virginia, Page was driven by her religious beliefs, particularly the Golden Rule, as well as a religious experience to emancipate slaves.

On the Sabbath after church, I was going, according to the general custom, to dine out; but the spirit of God spoke better counsel, and enabled me to turn into a solitary November home, without a white person near. This was the first time I had returned home on Sunday from a religious motive. I shut myself up in my room, where my soul was engaged with the thoughts of judgment and eternity. While thus engaged in my chamber, an old blind negro woman was led in, who was a dear child of God. We began a conversation in which she used expressions respecting entire confidence in Christ, which made an indelible impression upon my mind, being quite clear to me at this distant period. I think I owe her, under God, much of my religious joy in after years. Dark old creature, I often visited her in her cottage, and witnessed the evidences of her triumphant faith. She was a living example of Christ formed in the soul, the hope of glory.

— Ann Randolph Meade Page

Although she wanted to free their slaves, Matthew would not sanction their manumission. So she did what she could do, she provided care and education to their slaves. For instance, in 1814 she drew up plans for better houses for their enslaved families, with trees for shade and fruit, proper ventilation, and furnishings. The slaves on the Page's plantation, generally chose to be educated to read and write and many had become Christians. Men and women had learned a number of trades and domestic skills, respectively. Men could learn shoemaking, blacksmithing, and wheelwrighting, based on their interests and in addition to the farming.

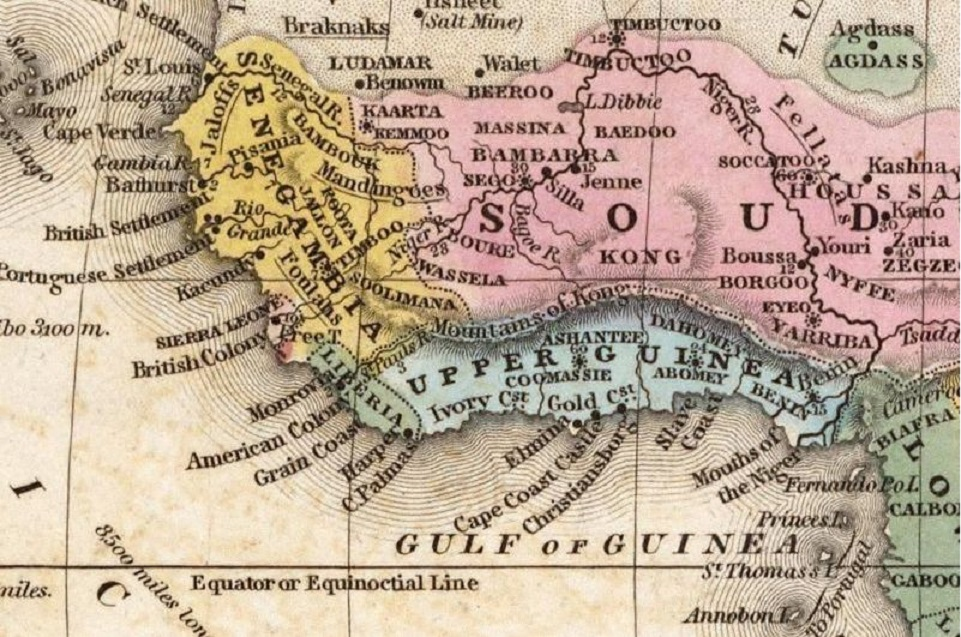
Liberia on a 1839 map of West Africa

In 1816, the American Colonization Society was formed. Along with her daughter, Sarah Page Andrews, and her brother, William Meade, she supported the transportation and settlement of freed slaves in Liberia. Page worked with her brother, William Meade, and with Mary Lee Fitzhugh Custis to end slavery and improve the conditions of enslaved people.

She considered her efforts to be "this holy work" and prayed "O that slavery's curse might cease". She worked harder to emancipate slaves following the death of her husband, Matthew, in 1826. Page also supported evangelization of Africa. She became an active and supportive member of the Society that mentored the white men who were agents and managers, including her future son-in-law Christopher Wesley Andrews. She prepared the enslaved people at Annefield for their lives in Africa and she stocked up on a year's worth of provisions to send with them to Liberia. She wrote to Ralph Randolph Gurley of the American Colonization Society on April 4, 1831 that she was coordinating the plan to move Annefield African American people to immigrate to Liberia, where they had a better chance of having a better and free future, where adults and their children were not at risk of being returned to slavery.

Several ships transported freed African Americans to Liberia, starting in 1832 and then in 1834 and 1836. Her efforts to free slaves led her to be considered "one of the most benevolent of colonizationist emancipators, and the people she freed — most members of an extended family with the same Page surname."

Although (and because) they were affluent slaveholders, a few antislavery activists, northern or southern, were as committed and influential as Ann R. Page and Mary L. Curtis. They embraced colonization, a movement that began and had its greatest support in the Upper South, because it relied on moral suasion, offered African Americans a refuge from prejudice and legal inequality they suffered in the United States, and helped to diffuse white's fears about the growing number of free blacks.

— Ann R. Page and Mary L. Curtis chapter, Virginia Women: The Lives and Times (Note: Page and Curtis were first cousins, one generation removed, and both were greatly influenced by the religious and humanitarian beliefs of their mothers, Mary Meade and Ann Bolling Randolph Fitzhugh.)

== Death ==
Matthew died in 1826 and Ann died on March 28, 1838, at Annefield. They were buried at Old Chapel Cemetery in Clarke County, Virginia.
