= James Sangster =

Nova Scotian politician (1796–1866)

James Sangster (1796 – July 2, 1866) was a farmer and political figure in Nova Scotia. He represented Falmouth township from 1847 to 1851 in the Nova Scotia House of Assembly as a Reformer.

He was born in Falmouth, Nova Scotia, the son of John Sangster, a native of Scotland, and Margaret Murdock. In 1837, he married Marion Wilcox. Sangster served as a lieutenant and later captain in the local militia. He was an agent for quarries owned by Thomas Chandler Haliburton.
