= University Chapel =

University chapel in Virginia, US

- University Chapel of Washington and Lee University
- U.S. National Register of Historic Places
- U.S. National Historic Landmark
- U.S. National Historic Landmark District – Contributing property
- Virginia Landmarks Register
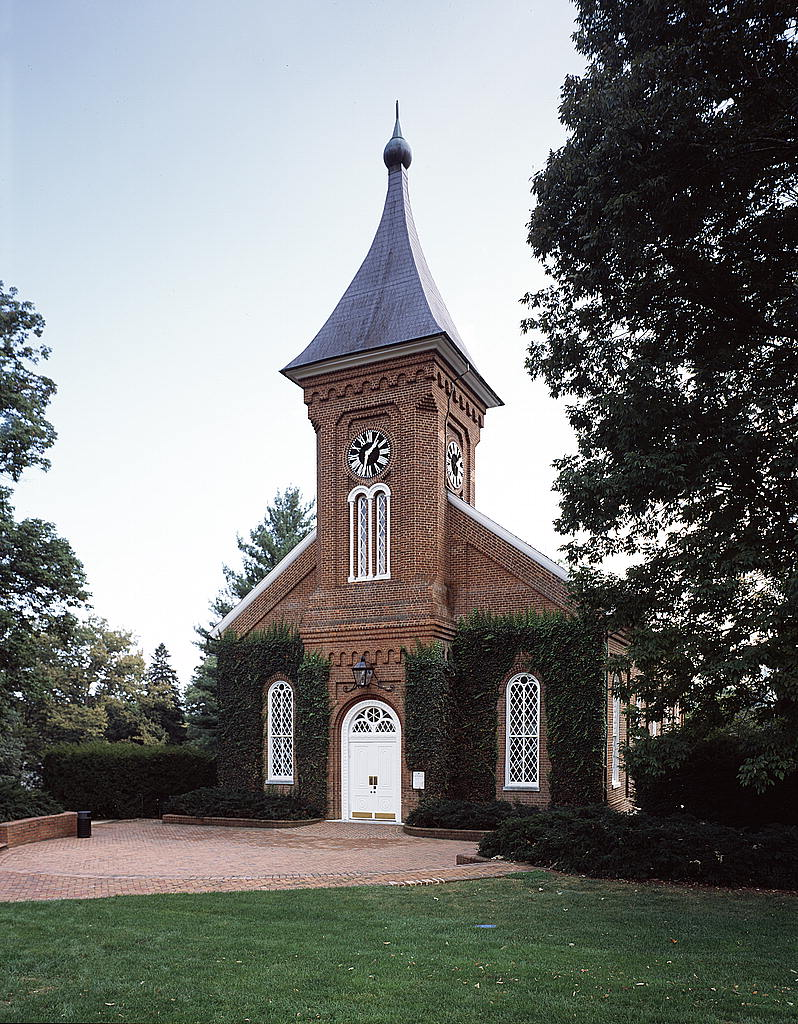
- University Chapel of Washington and Lee University

- Location within Virginia Location within the United States
- Location: Washington and Lee University campus, Lexington, Virginia
- Coordinates: 37°47′14″N 79°26′32″W
- Built: 1867
- Architectural style: Romanesque Revival
- Part of: Washington and Lee University Historic District (ID71001047)
- NRHP reference No.: 66000914
- VLR No.: 117-0019

Significant dates
- Added to NRHP: October 15, 1966
- Designated NHL: December 19, 1960
- Designated NHLDCP: November 11, 1971
- Designated VLR: September 9, 1969

University Chapel of Washington and Lee University is a National Historic Landmark in Lexington, Virginia. It was constructed during 1867–68 at the request of Robert E. Lee, who was president of the school (then known as Washington College), and after whom the university is, in part, named. The Victorian brick architectural design was probably the work of Lee's son, George Washington Custis Lee, with details contributed by Col. Thomas Williamson, an architect and professor of engineering at the neighboring Virginia Military Institute. Upon completion and during Robert E. Lee's lifetime it was known as the College Chapel. Lee was buried beneath the chapel in 1870.

== Recumbent statue of Lee ==
"Recumbent Statue" of Robert E. Lee asleep on the battlefield, by Edward Valentine. It is often mistakenly thought to be a tomb or sarcophagus, but is a statue on a base or couch. Lee is buried in a crypt beneath the chapel.

The centerpiece of the apse of the chapel—in the place where an altar is located in the traditional plan of a Christian church—is a statue of Lee, in his uniform, asleep on an unnamed Civil War battlefield. The "Recumbent Lee" is by sculptor Edward Valentine whose statue of Lee, formerly displayed as one of Virginia's representatives in National Statuary Hall, was removed from the U.S. Capitol, and whose statues of Jefferson Davis were removed from Richmond, Virginia's Monument Avenue and New Orleans.

The recumbent statue was unveiled and dedicated as the main feature of the chapel on June 28, 1883. The keynote speaker, John W. Daniel, soon to be a U.S. senator from Virginia, and filling in for the absent Jefferson Davis, said of Robert E. Lee's decision to lead the armed forces of Virginia at the outset of the Civil War,

"Since the Son of Man stood upon the Mount, and saw 'all the kingdoms of the earth and the glory thereof' stretched before him, and turned away from them to the agony and bloody sweat of Gethsemane, and to the Cross of Calvary beyond, no follower of the meek and lowly Saviour can have undergone more trying ordeal [than Lee]. Thus, with as chaste a heart as ever plighted its faith until death, for better or for worse, [Lee] came to do, to suffer, and to die for us." Reflecting upon Lee's death and its aftermath, Daniel continued, "[Lee] has left a great, imperishable legacy to us and our heirs forever. The heart of man is his perpetual kingdom. There he reigns transcendent, and we exclaim: 'Oh, king, live forever.'" Daniel lamented that Lee had died a prisoner on parole, his American citizenship never fully restored: "The country which gave the right of suffrage to the alien ere he could speak its language, and to the African freedman ere he could read or understand its laws, denied to him the privilege of a ballot ... himself and his Commander-in-Chief [Davis] constituting the most conspicuous of its political slaves."

Washington and Lee History Professor Ted DeLaney, who was born and grew up in Lexington during Jim Crow and was the first Black chair of W&L's history department, in 2019 offered his opinion of the Robert E. Lee statue and its placement in the chapel: "The symbolism there is a violation of the first commandment."

== Building and history ==
On the chapel walls, on either side of the statue chamber alcove, are two paintings: one of President George Washington by Gilbert Stuart from 1796, and another of Lee painted by J. Reid, from 1866. In 2018, these replaced a portrait of Washington by Charles Willson Peale from the Washington family collections, and another of Lee in his uniform, painted by Edward Pine, in order to reflect the time periods of the association of each university namesake with the school. There is also a plaque given by the Sigma Society on one of the walls that honors two Sigma alumni from the classes of 1912 and 1915 who died in World War I.

In the basement a crypt (added after Lee's burial) contains the remains of much of Lee's direct family: Lee himself, his wife Mary Anna Custis Lee, his seven children—George Washington Custis Lee, Mary Custis Lee, William Henry Fitzhugh Lee, Anne Carter Lee, Robert E. Lee Jr., Eleanor Agnes Lee, and Mildred Childe Lee, and his parents—Revolutionary War Major-General Henry "Light-Horse Harry" Lee, and Anne Hill Carter Lee. Lee's favorite horse, Traveller, is buried just outside the Chapel, where many visitors leave coins, apples, and other tributes. In the basement of the Chapel is a museum that illuminates the history of the families of George Washington and Robert E. Lee as well as that of the university itself. Lee's office has been meticulously preserved almost exactly as it was when he died.

The Chapel plays a role in the modern operation of Washington and Lee. It seats about 600 in its main area and in a small, three-sided balcony. First-year students have assembled there to hear the president of the University's student-run Executive Committee speak on the school's Honor System. Important school-wide lectures, concerts, and other notable activities are held there from time to time. For many years the school's annual convocation of Omicron Delta Kappa, or ODK, a national honor society founded at Washington and Lee on December 3, 1914, was held in the Chapel on or about Robert E. Lee's birthday, January 19, in conjunction with a board of trustees-mandated university holiday/Lee commemoration called "Founders Day," a version of the Robert E. Lee Day birthday holiday still officially celebrated in a few southern states.

== Changes by the administration ==
In 2014, Confederate flags surrounding the Lee statue in the chapel were removed after student petitions. At that time, Robert E. Lee's great-grandson and 1949 W&L alumnus Robert E. Lee IV wrote in favor of this change, saying, "In my view, removing the flags from the statuary chamber is overdue." Since 2018, large doors placed before the chamber housing the statue of Lee are closed for most university events, obscuring the chamber and statue, keeping it "functionally separate from the chapel's assembly hall" at those times, with the stated intention that in doing so the chapel can be "welcoming to all members of our community."

University Chapel was officially renamed from Lee Chapel on June 4, 2021, by the university's board of trustees. The university also announced the discontinuation of its school holiday known as "Founders Day," held on Robert E. Lee's birthday, and significant upcoming redesign and renovations of the chapel to be overseen by the board "to restore its unadorned design and physically separate the auditorium from the Lee family crypt and Lee memorial sculpture."

University Chapel, then known as Lee Chapel, was designated a National Historic Landmark in 1960. Novelist Ralph Ellison became the first African American to speak there in 1963. It is open for public tours.

== See also ==
- List of National Historic Landmarks in Virginia
- National Register of Historic Places listings in Lexington, Virginia
- List of memorials to Robert E. Lee
