= Robert E. Lee Jr. =

Confederate officer, businessman and writer

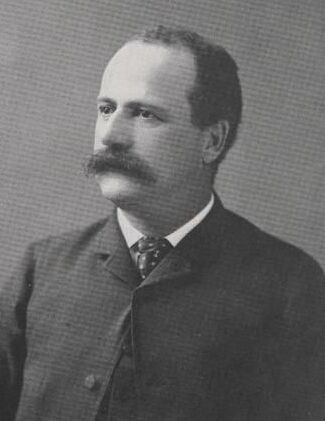
- Born: October 27, 1843; Arlington House, Virginia, U.S.
- Died: October 19, 1914 (aged 70)
- Resting place: University Chapel; Washington and Lee University; Lexington, Virginia, U.S.
- Notable work: Recollections and Letters of General Robert E. Lee (1904)
- Spouses: Charlotte Haxall; (m. 1871; died 1872); Juliet Case (m. 1894)
- Children: Anne Carter Lee; Mary Custis Lee
- Parents: Robert E. Lee; Mary Anna Custis
- Military career
- Allegiance: Confederate States
- Branch: Confederate States Army
- Service years: 1862–1865
- Rank: Captain
- Conflicts: American Civil War

Robert Edward Lee Jr. (October 27, 1843 – October 19, 1914) was the sixth of seven children of Confederate General Robert E. Lee, of the Lee Family of Virginia, and Mary Anna Randolph Custis. He became a soldier during the American Civil War, and later was a planter, businessman, and author.

== Early life ==
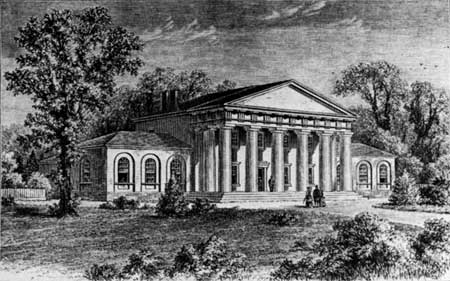
Arlington House, Lee's birthplace

Rob Lee was born and raised at Arlington House across the Potomac River from Washington, D.C. He was close to his father, who he was named after, and his sister, Mildred Childe Lee. He attended boarding schools during much of the 1850s, while his father, a career U.S. Army officer, was serving in the Mexican–American War and as Superintendent of the United States Military Academy at West Point, New York. Unlike his father and two older brothers, Rob apparently never envisioned a military career, never serving in the United States Army. In 1860, he enrolled at the University of Virginia.

== Civil War ==
When the American Civil War broke out in 1861, his father and his two older brothers, Custis and Rooney, all chose to serve Virginia in the Confederate Army. To his mother's dismay, Rob joined them in 1862, enlisting in the Rockbridge Artillery as a private.

During the Battle of Sharpsburg in September 1862, young Robert watched his father ride up to his artillery battery, which had already been heavily engaged. Junior stood by expecting to hear a few words of affection from his father, but Lee did not recognize his own son, hidden by the grime of black powder on his face. When Junior finally spoke up to ask if they would be thrown back into the fight, the general recognized him by his voice. "Yes, my son. You must do what you can to drive those people back," Lee said. After the Maryland Campaign, he was promoted to lieutenant and assigned as an aide to his older brother General William Henry Fitzhugh Lee, rising to the rank of captain before the end of the war.

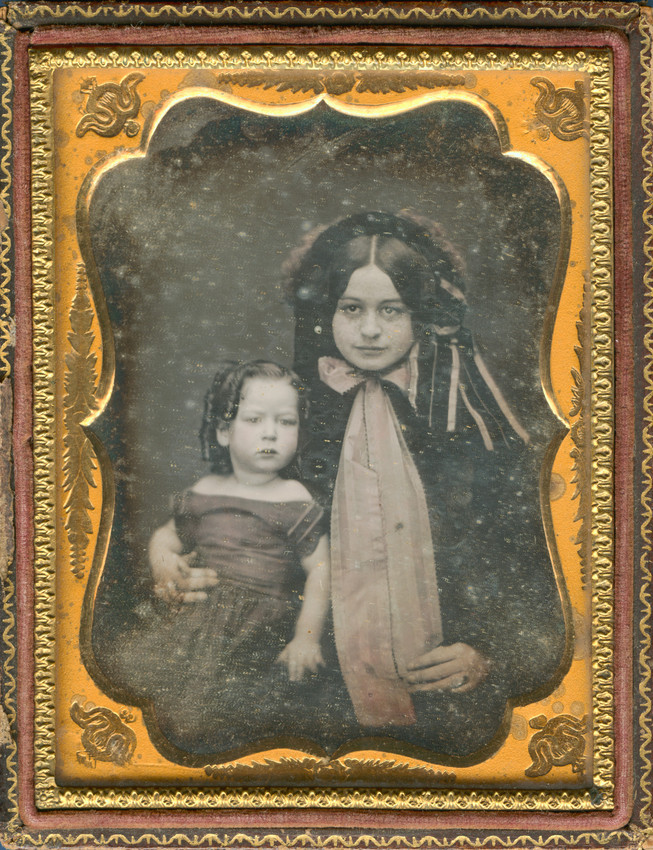
Robert E. Lee Jr. and his mother, Mary (c. 1845)

"He frightened the family near the end of the war by disappearing for nearly a month after his horse was wounded on the retreat from Petersburg. By the time he had found another, the Federals were between him and his father's army. He turned south and was in the room in Greensboro, North Carolina, when Jefferson Davis got confirmation that the elder Lee had surrendered at Appomattox."

== Postbellum career ==
All four Lees survived the Civil War. After the war, Lee lived and farmed Romancoke Plantation on the north bank of the Pamunkey River in King William County, which he inherited from his maternal grandfather George Washington Parke Custis. Romancoke was located approximately four miles from the Town of West Point.

Lee also became a writer, gathering his memories of his family and life in Recollections and Letters of General Robert E. Lee (1904). The first-hand account provides a valuable source of information on day-to-day life at Arlington House during his youth, and includes many items of interest regarding his father's entire life.

Robert E. Lee Jr. died in 1914. He was interred with his parents and siblings in the college chapel, now known as University Chapel in Lexington, Virginia, where his father and brother Custis each had served as a president of the college now known as Washington and Lee University.

== Marriage and family ==
Robert Lee married twice. On November 16, 1871, he married Charlotte Haxall (October 23, 1848 – September 22, 1872). No children survived her.

On March 8, 1894, in Washington D.C., he married Juliet Case (April 6, 1860 – November 17, 1915), who was 16 years younger than him. They had two daughters, Anne Carter Lee (July 21, 1897 - November 8, 1978) and Mary Custis Lee (December 23, 1900 - December 26, 1994).

Lee's mother, Mary Anna Randolph Custis Lee, was the only surviving child of George Washington Parke Custis and Mary Lee Fitzhugh. George Washington Parke Custis was the grandson of Martha Dandridge and adopted grandson (although not legally) of George Washington.

Ancestors of Robert E. Lee Jr.

16. Henry Lee I
8. Henry Lee II
17. Mary Bland
4. Henry Lee III
18. Charles Grymes
9. Lucy Grymes
19. Frances Jennings
2. Robert E. Lee
20. John Carter
10. Charles Hill Carter
21. Elizabeth Hill
5. Anne Hill Carter
22. Bernard Moore
11. Ann Butler Moore
23. Anne Catherine Spotswood
1. Robert E. Lee Jr.
24. Daniel Parke Custis
12. John Parke Custis
25. Martha Dandridge
6. George Washington Parke Custis
26. Benedict Swingate Calvert
13. Eleanor Calvert
27. Elizabeth Calvert
3. Mary Anna Randolph Custis
28. Henry Fitzhugh
14. William Fitzhugh
29. Lucy Carter
7. Mary Lee Fitzhugh
30. Peter Randolph
15. Anne Randolph
31. Lucy Bolling
