= Mary Anna Custis Lee =

Wife of Robert E. Lee (1807–1873)

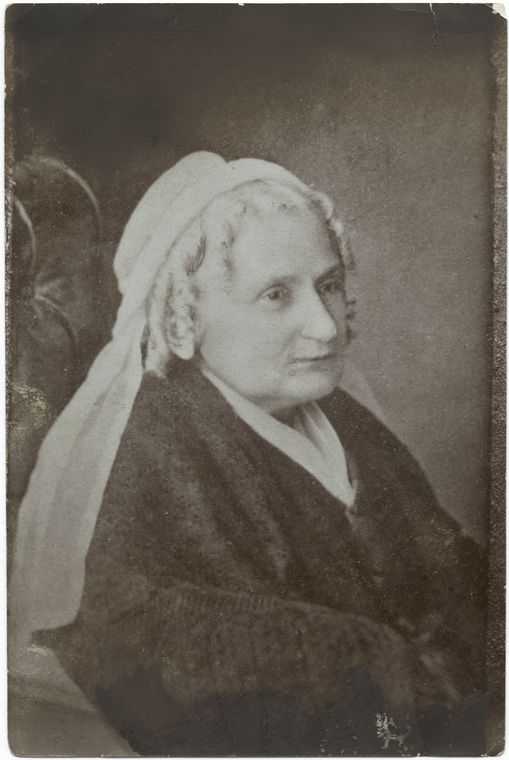
- Born: Mary Anna Randolph Custis; October 1, 1807; Annefield, Boyce, Virginia, U.S.
- Died: November 5, 1873 (aged 66); Lexington, Virginia, U.S.
- Resting place: University Chapel; Washington and Lee University; Lexington, Virginia, U.S.
- Notable work: Recollections and Private Memoirs of Washington, by his Adopted Son George Washington Parke Custis, with a Memoir of this Author by his Daughter (1859)
- Spouse: Robert E. Lee (m. 1831; died 1870)
- Children: George; Mary; William; Robert Jr.; Anne; Eleanor; Mildred
- Parents: George Washington Parke Custis; Mary Lee Fitzhugh Custis
- Relatives: Martha Washington (great-grandmother) Maria Carter Syphax (half-sister)

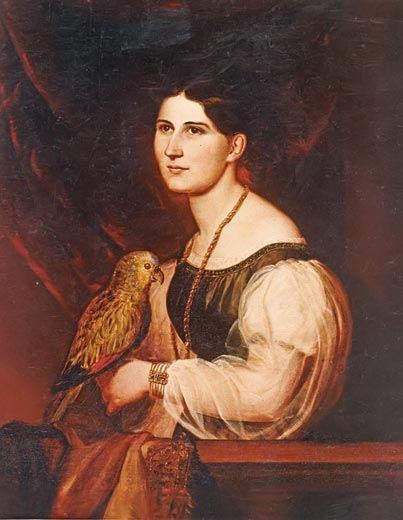
Portrait of Mary Anna Custis by Auguste Hervieu (1830)

Mary Anna Randolph Custis Lee (October 1, 1807 – November 5, 1873) was the wife of the Confederate general Robert E. Lee and the last private owner of Arlington House. She was the daughter of George Washington Parke Custis, who was the grandson of Martha Washington, the wife of George Washington. Through her grandmother Eleanor Calvert she was a descendant of King George I. Lee was a highly educated woman, who edited and published her father's writings after his death.

Mary married Robert E. Lee in 1831 at her parents' home, Arlington House, in Virginia. The couple had seven children. Although she sometimes lived with Lee when he was assigned elsewhere, she preferred to reside at Arlington House with her parents. Robert E. Lee resigned from his commission with the U.S. Army to serve his home state of Virginia during the Civil War; he eventually commanded the Confederate Army of Northern Virginia.

Mary Lee was separated from her husband for the majority of the war, during which time she and her children were forced to stay with various family friends. She was never able to return to Arlington House, as it was seized by the United States federal government at the end of the war. After the war, Robert E. Lee became the president of Washington College, and died in 1870. Mary Lee died in 1873.

== Life ==
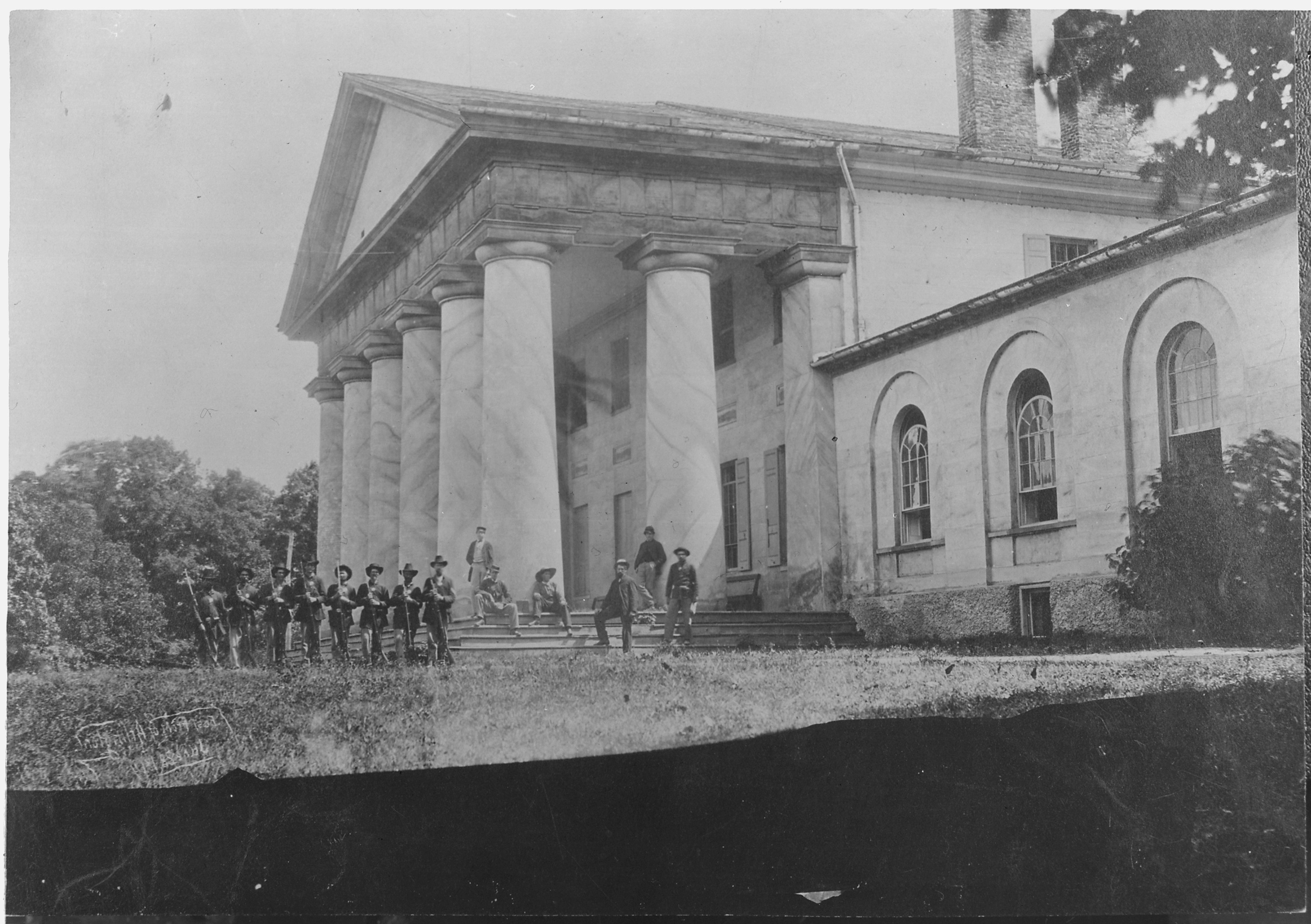
East front of Custis Lee Mansion with Union Soldiers on lawn

=== Early life and ancestry ===
Coat of Arms of John Custis

Arms of George Washington Parke Custis

Mary Anna Randolph Custis Lee was the only surviving child of George Washington Parke Custis (the grandson of Martha Washington and the step-grandson of George Washington) and Mary Lee Fitzhugh Custis, daughter of William Fitzhugh and Ann Bolling Randolph Fitzhugh. Her godmother, Mary Randolph, was the first person buried at Arlington Estate. She wrote a book on housekeeping and cooking. Lee's birth year is usually shown as 1808, but it recorded as 1807 in the Custis family Bible, her mother's papers, and is referred to in a letter her mother wrote in the autumn of 1807. She was born at Annefield in Clarke County, Virginia when her mother's coach stopped there during a journey.

Lee was descended from several prominent southern colonial families, including those of Parke Custis, Fitzhugh, Dandrige, Randolph, Rolfe, and Gerard. Through her paternal grandmother, Eleanor Calvert, she descended from Charles Calvert, 5th Baron Baltimore, making her a descendant of Charles II of England and Scotland. Through her mother, Mary Lee Fitzhugh Custis, she was a descendant of William Fitzhugh.

=== Marriage and later life ===
Mary had known her third cousin Robert E. Lee since their childhood. Her mother and Robert Lee's mother were second cousins. Lee's father, "Light-Horse Harry" Lee, a hero of the American Revolutionary War, delivered the eulogy at George Washington's funeral. She married Robert E. Lee in 1831 at her parents' home, Arlington House. At the time, Robert E. Lee was a lieutenant in the U.S. Army Engineers. Among Mary Lee's other suitors was Sam Houston.

Lee was a well educated woman, having learned both Latin and Greek. She enjoyed discussing politics with her father, and later with her husband. She kept current with the new literature.

Lee inherited Arlington House from her father when he died in 1857. The estate had been the couple's home during her husband's military career. She was a gracious hostess and enjoyed frequent visitors. She was a painter, like her father, and painted many landscapes, some of which are still on view at the house. She loved roses and grew many varieties of trees and flowers in the gardens there.

After her father's death, she edited and published his writings as Recollections and Private Memoirs of Washington, by his Adopted Son George Washington Parke Custis, with a Memoir of this Author by his Daughter in 1859.

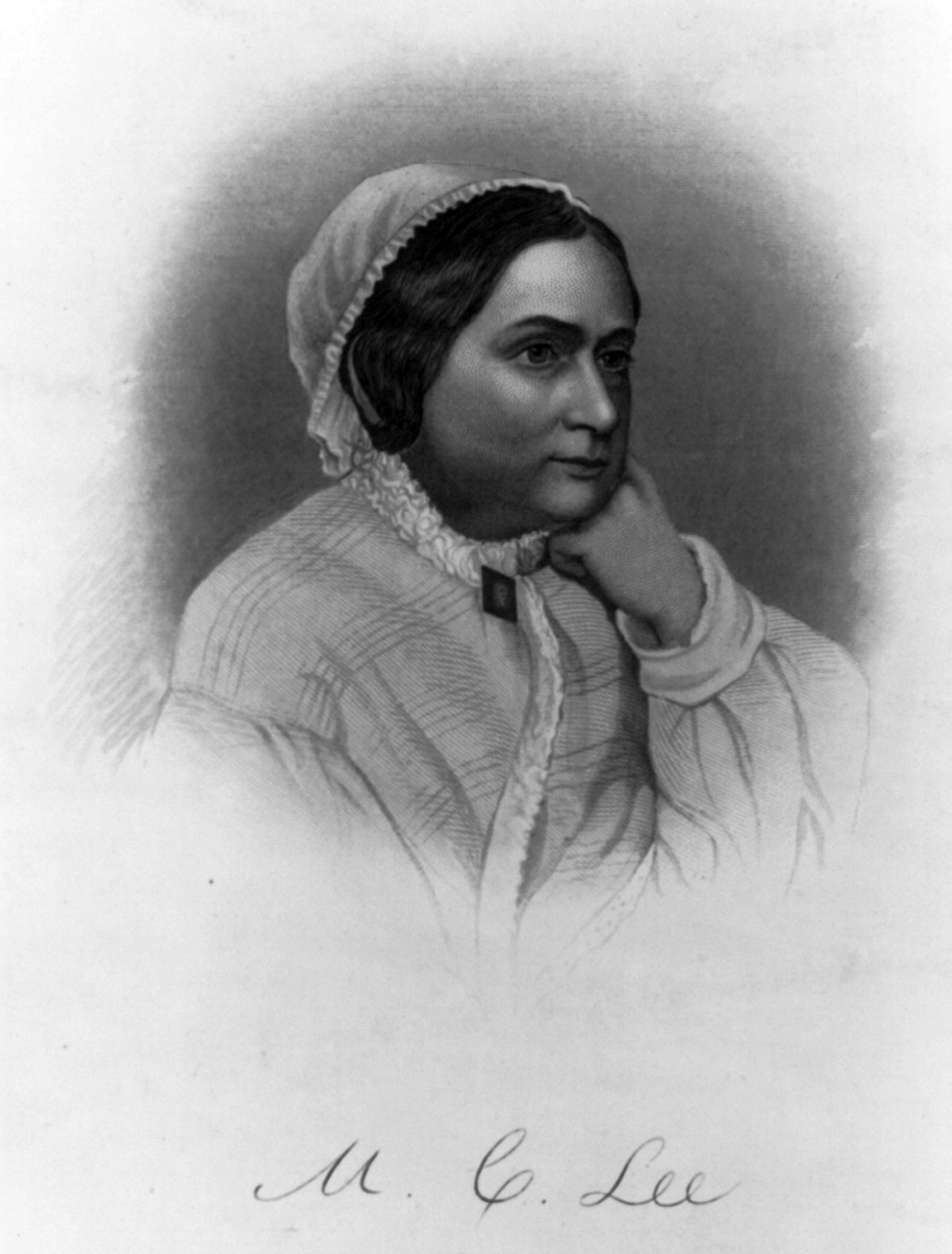
Engraving of Mary Anna Custis Lee, 1854

Deeply religious, Lee attended Episcopal services when there was one near the army post. From Arlington, Virginia, the Lees attended Christ Church in Alexandria, which she and Robert had both attended in childhood.

Lee taught her female slaves to read and write and was an advocate of eventual emancipation. However, she did not work to support abolition or racial equality and did not free any of her slaves before the abolition of slavery in 1865.

She suffered from rheumatoid arthritis, which became increasingly debilitating with advancing age. By 1861, she was using a wheelchair.

With the advent of the U.S. Civil War, Mary Custis Lee delayed evacuating Arlington House until May 15, 1861. She left many family heirlooms (including items owned by George Washington) in the hands of Selina Grey, her enslaved housekeeper. Early that month, Robert wrote to his wife saying:

War is inevitable, and there is no telling when it will burst around you ... You have to move and make arrangements to go to some point of safety which you must select. The Mount Vernon plate and pictures ought to be secured. Keep quiet while you remain, and in your preparations ... May God keep and preserve you and have mercy on all our people.

Lee and her daughters initially moved among the several family plantations. In May 1862, she was caught at her son Rooney's White House plantation in New Kent County behind the Federal lines, as Union forces moved up the York and the Pamunkey rivers toward Richmond. The Union commander, George B. McClellan, allowed her passage through the lines in order to take up residence in Richmond—the city which was also McClellan's campaign goal.

Lee and her daughters settled at 707 East Franklin Street in Richmond for a time. The family next moved to the plantation estate of the Cocke family at Bremo Bluff, where they sought refuge until after the end of the war in November 1865.

After the war, the Lees lived in Powhatan County for a short time before moving to Lexington. Robert E. Lee became president of the Washington College, later renamed Washington and Lee University.

Arlington House was seized by the United States federal government after the war to allow for the creation of Arlington National Cemetery. Lee attempted to regain ownership of her family home by writing to "friends, relatives, newspaper editors, and politicians," to no avail. Similarly, she was never able to regain ownership of family heirlooms that had once belonged to George Washington. Lee visited Arlington House one last time in 1873, a few months before her death. She was unable to leave her horse carriage due to her debilitating rheumatoid arthritis, hardly recognizing the estate except for a few old oaks and some of the trees that she and Robert had planted.

In her later life she would begin writing her memoirs, often ranting against the "theft, murder, and arson" committed by Union troops in them. She would also make paintings which she would sell for Confederate charities.

Mary Anna Custis Lee died at the age of 66 in 1873, surviving her husband by three years. She was buried next to him in the Lee family crypt at University Chapel on the campus of Washington and Lee University.

== Marriage and family ==
Mary and Robert were married at her parents' home, Arlington House, on June 30, 1831. They had three sons and four daughters together: George Washington Custis "Custis", William H. Fitzhugh "Rooney", Robert Edward Jr., Mary, Eleanor Agnes (called Agnes), Anne, and Mildred Lee. None of their daughters married.

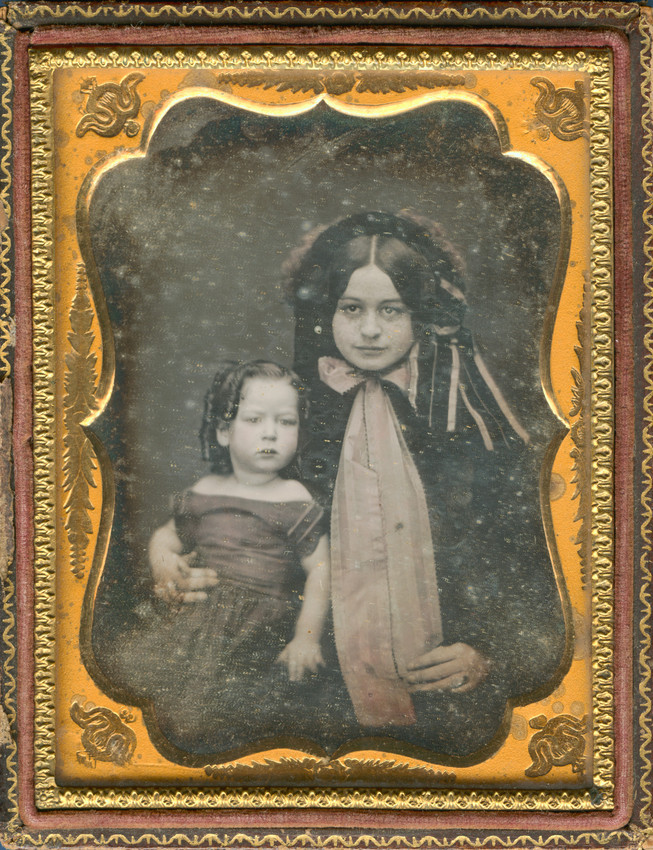
Mary Anna Custis Lee and her son, Robert E. Lee, Jr., c. 1845

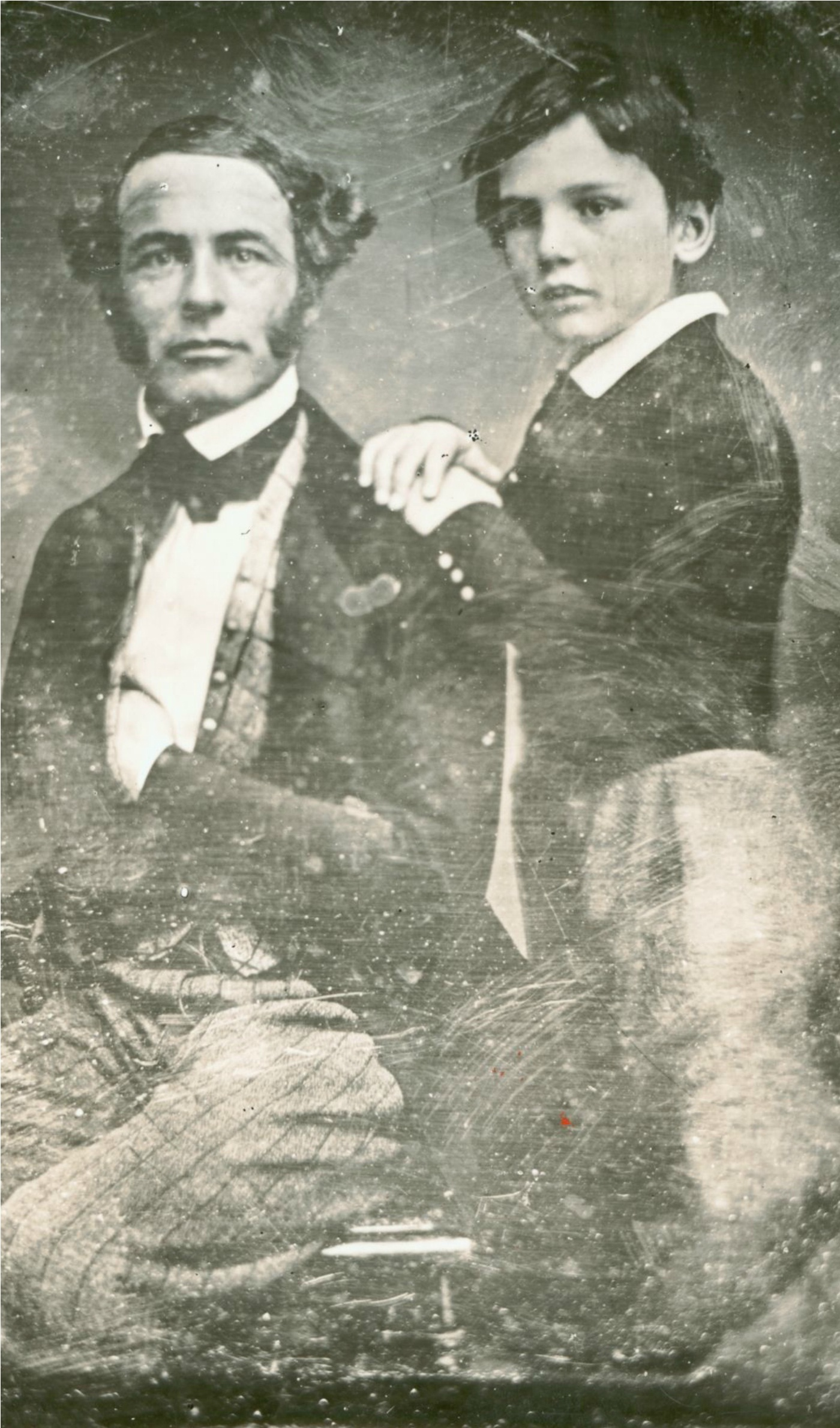
Rooney Lee, about 8 years old, with his father Robert E. Lee, 1845

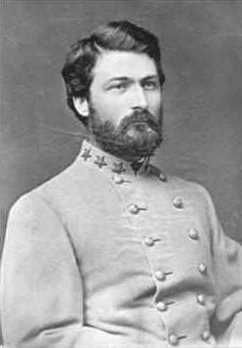
Major General George Washington Custis Lee (1832–1913)

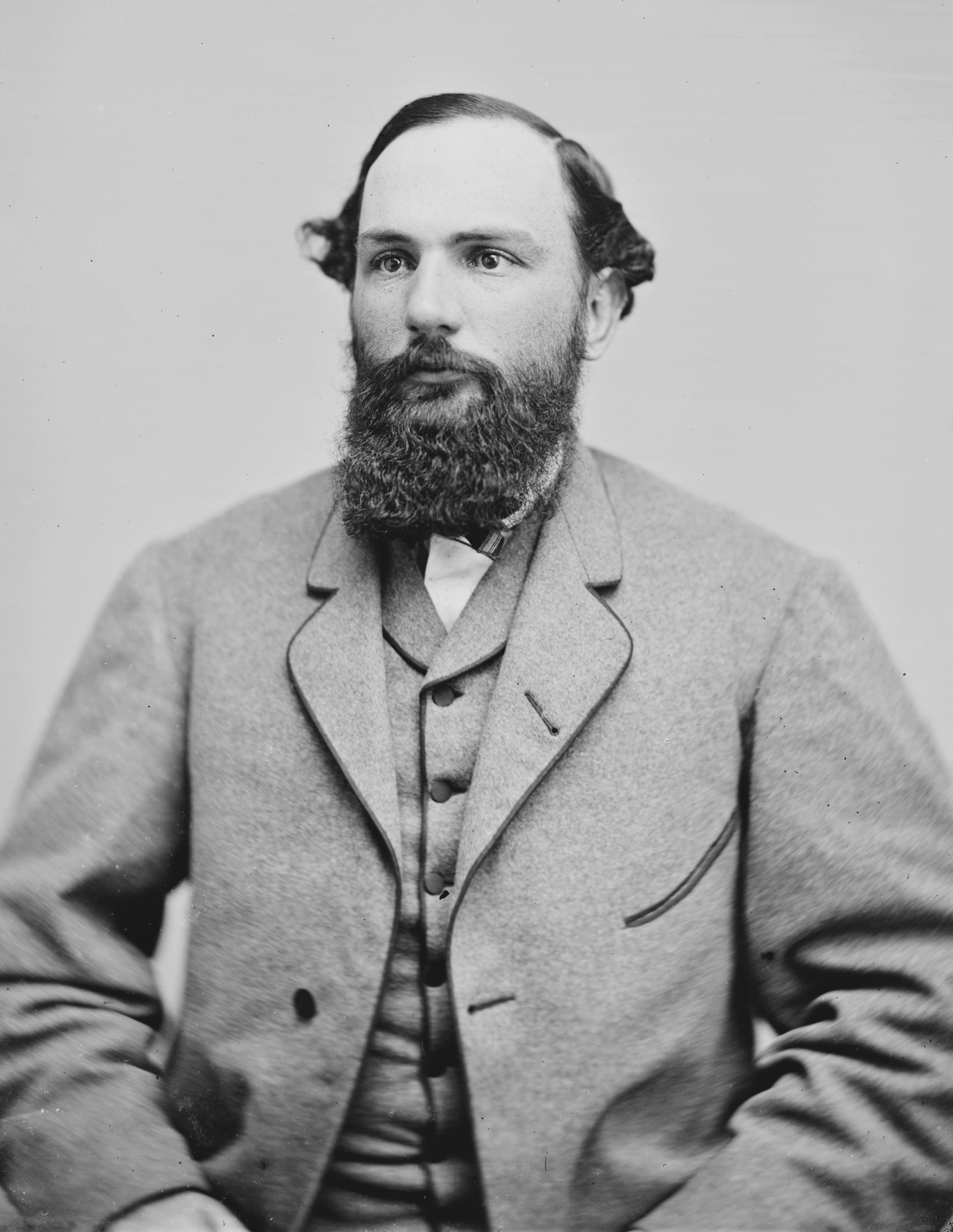
Major General William Henry Fitzhugh Lee (1837–1891)

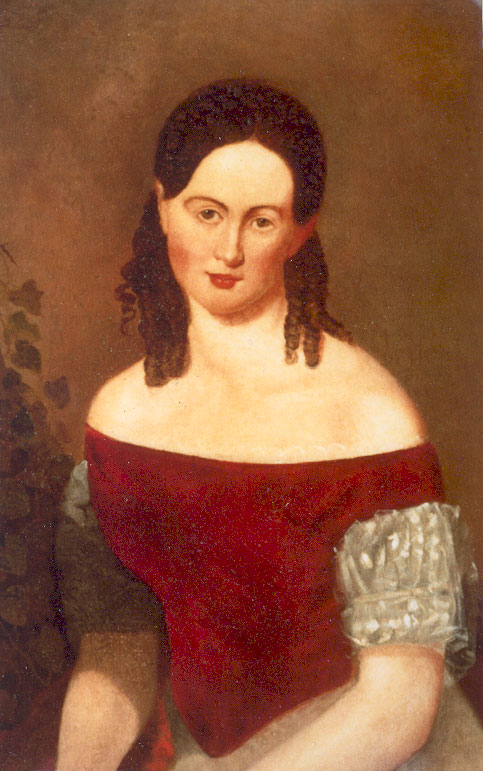
Anne Carter Lee (1839–1862)

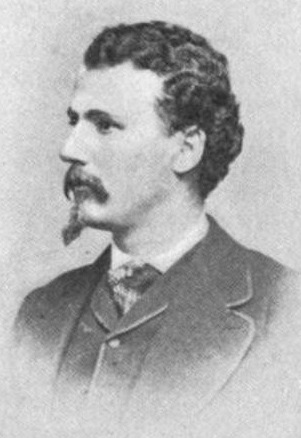
Captain Robert E. Lee Jr. (1843–1914)

=== Ancestry ===
Ancestors of Mary Anna Custis Lee

16. John Custis
8. Daniel Parke Custis
17. Frances Parke
4. John Parke Custis
18. John Dandridge
9. Martha Dandridge
19. Frances Jones
2. George Washington Parke Custis
20. Charles Calvert, 5th Baron Baltimore
10. Benedict Swingate Calvert
21. Melusina von der Schulenburg, Countess of Walsingham
5. Eleanor Calvert
22. Captain Charles Calvert
11. Elizabeth Calvert
23. Rebecca Gerard
1. Mary Anna Randolph Custis
24. William Fitzhugh
12. Henry Fitzhugh
25. Ann Lee
6. William Fitzhugh
26. Robert Carter I
13. Lucy Carter
27. Betty Landon
3. Mary Lee Fitzhugh
28. William Randolph II
14. Peter Randolph
29. Elizabeth Beverley
7. Ann Bolling Randolph
30. Robert Bolling Jr.
15. Lucy Bolling
31. Anne Mary Cocke

== Cultural references ==
Harnett Kane's 1953 novel, The Lady of Arlington, is based on Mrs. Lee's life.

Mary Custis Lee is a major supporting character in The Guns of the South, a 1992 science fiction novel by Harry Turtledove.

Dorothy Love's 2016 novel, Mrs. Lee and Mrs. Gray, is based on Lee's dependence upon and friendship with Selina Norris Gray, a Custis family slave who became Lee's housekeeper and confidante.

Mary Anna Custis Lee plays a minor role in Jeff Shaara's 1996 novel Gods and Generals.
