= Mary Lee Fitzhugh Custis =

American Episcopal lay leader (1788–1853)

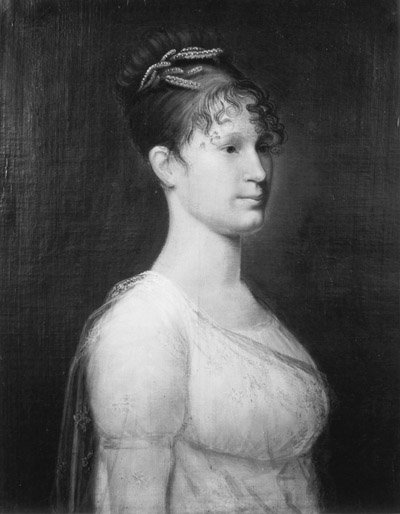
- Born: Mary Lee Fitzhugh; 22 April 1788; Chatham Manor, Stafford County, Virginia, U.S.
- Died: 23 April 1853 (aged 65); Arlington House, Arlington County, Virginia, U.S.
- Spouse: George Washington Parke Custis (m. 1804)
- Children: 4, including Mary Anna Custis Lee
- Parent(s): Ann Bolling Randolph Fitzhugh; William Fitzhugh

Mary Lee Fitzhugh Custis (April 22, 1788 – April 23, 1853) was an American Episcopal lay leader in Alexandria County, Virginia in present-day Arlington County. She was the mother of Mary Anna Randolph Custis, who was the wife of Confederate general Robert E. Lee. In the early 1820s, Custis helped form a coalition of women who sought to abolish slavery.

== Early life ==
Mary Lee Fitzhugh was born at Chatham Manor in present-day Stafford County, Virginia, the daughter of William Fitzhugh, a delegate to the Continental Congress in Philadelphia, and Ann Bolling Randolph Fitzhugh.

== Marriage and family ==
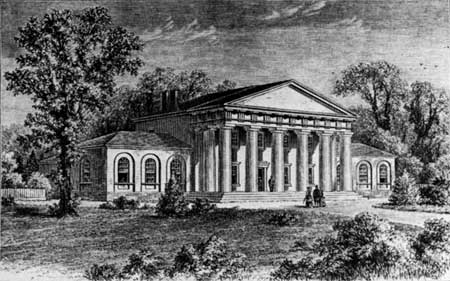
An 1875 sketch of Arlington House

On July 7, 1804, she married George Washington Parke Custis, an orator, playwright, writer, and the grandson of Martha Custis Washington through her first marriage to Daniel Parke Custis. With the marriage, Molly Custis became George Washington's step-granddaughter-in-law. Her father William Fitzhugh and Washington were long-time friends, and Washington wrote favorably in his diaries about the hospitality of Molly's mother Ann Bolling Randolph Fitzhugh. In 1799, Washington left Mount Vernon to meet with William Fitzhugh, which proved to be his last trip away from Mount Vernor prior to his December 14, 1799 death.

The Custises lived at Arlington House, an 1,100-acre (4.5 km^{2}) plantation in what was then Alexandria County and is now Arlington County, Virginia. The couple had four children, but only Mary Anna Randolph Custis, who later married Robert E. Lee, survived childhood; Lee's father Henry had famously eulogized President George Washington at his 1799 funeral.

Molly Custis' brother, William Henry Fitzhugh, supported his niece Anne Lee and her six children by allowing them to stay at his home at Ravensworth in present-day Fairfax County, Virginia, where she died in 1829. In 1824, when Robert E. Lee was 17, William Henry Fitzhugh wrote to the Secretary of War, John C. Calhoun, urging that Robert be given an appointment to the U.S. Military Academy at West Point, New York.

== Religious influence ==
Molly Custis was a member of a family network in Northern Virginia that helped revive the state's Episcopal Church in the first part of the nineteenth century. She particularly influenced her cousin, Bishop William Meade. Molly Custis promoted Sunday schools and supported the work of the American Colonization Society. She followed the teachings of the Second Great Awakening, with its emotional surrender to a just but inscrutable God and rejection of transient worldly pleasures.

== Death ==
Custis died at Arlington on April 23, 1853, a day after her 65th birthday and was buried on the estate. Her husband survived her by four years, at which point Arlington House and the grounds were inherited by their daughter Mary Anna Randolph Custis, Mrs. Robert E. Lee.
