= List of people with the English surname Lee =

People with the surname Lee (English)

This is a list of people with the English surname Lee.

== People ==
=== A ===
- Aaron Lee (born 1972), Singaporean prize-winning poet
- Abra Lee (born 1978), American public horticulturalist, historian and writer
- Abbey Lee (born 1987), Australian model, actress and musician
- Agnes Lee (1862–1939), American poet
- Alan Lee (footballer) (born 1978), Irish footballer
- Albert Lee (born 1943), English guitarist
- Alex Lee, multiple people
- Alexis Lee (born 1995), Singaporean professional wrestler
- Ali Lee (born 1982), Hong Kong actress and television host
- Alice Lee, multiple people
- Alison Lee (born 1995), American professional golfer
- Alma Lee (1914–2000), Swiss-born naturalised British philatelist
- Alvin Lee (1944–2013), born Graham Barnes, English guitarist and lead singer of the band Ten Years After
- Amasa Coleman Lee (1880–1962), American politician
- Ameera Lee (born 1974), Australian Paralympic archer
- Amos Lee (born 1977), American singer
- Amy Lee (born 1981), American singer
- Amy Freeman Lee (1914–2004), American artist, writer and lecturer
- Anders Lee (born 1990), American ice hockey player
- Andy Lee, multiple people
- Ang Lee (born 1954), Oscar-winning Taiwanese film director
- Ann Lee (1736–1784), leader of the Shaker movement
- Ann Lee (actress) (1918–2003), American businesswoman and actress
- Ann Lee (illustrator) (1753–c.1790), botanical, insect and bird illustrator
- Ann Lee (singer) (born 1967), English pop singer
- Anna Lee (1913–2004), English actress, was on General Hospital, real name Joan Boniface Winnifrith
- Annabelle Lee (1922–2008), All-American Girls Professional Baseball League pitcher
- Anne Carter Lee (1839–1862), daughter of Robert E. Lee
- Anne Hill Carter Lee (1773–1829), First Lady of Virginia
- Anthony Lee (1961–2000), American actor and playwright
- Anthony Lee (c.1510–1549), English courtier and Member of Parliament
- Art Lee (born 1947), Canadian politician
- Arthur Lee, multiple people
- Auriol Lee (1880–1941), English actress, stage director and producer
- Austin Lee (born 1983), American artist
- Ayoka Lee (born 2000), American former basketball player

=== B ===
- Bandy X. Lee (born 1970), American forensic psychiatrist
- Barbara Lee (born 1946), U.S. Representative from California's 9th congressional district
- Benjamin W. Lee (1935–1977), Korean American theoretical physicist
- Benny Lee (1916–1995), Scottish comedy actor and singer
- Benny Lee (born 1965), American badminton player
- Bernard Lee (1908–1981), actor best known for portraying M in the James Bond films
- Bibi Lee (died 1984), American formerly missing person
- Bill Lee (author) (born 1954), Chinese-American writer and ex-member of the Joe Boys
- Bill Lee (born 1946), Major League Baseball pitcher
- Bill Lee (1928–2023), American musician
- Bill Lee (1909–1977), Major League Baseball player from 1934 to 1947
- Bobby Lee (born 1971), comedian on MADtv
- Brandon Lee (1965–1993), Chinese-American actor and son of Bruce Lee
- Brandun Lee (born 1999), American boxer of Korean and Mexican descent
- Brenda Lee (born 1944), American singer
- Brenko Lee (born 1995), Australian rugby league player
- Brett Lee, Australian cricketer
- Bri Lee (born 1991), Australian writer
- Brian Lee, multiple people
- Brodie Lee (1979–2020), American wrestler
- Brooks Lee (born 2001), American baseball player
- Bruce Lee (1940–1973), Hong Kong actor and martial artist, son of Lee Hoi-chuen
- Bruce George Peter Lee (born 1960), prolific British serial killer, arsonist, and mass murderer
- Byron Lee, (1935–2008), Jamaican musician, record producer and entrepreneur

=== C ===
- Cameron Lee (born 1993), American football player
- Candice Storey Lee (born c. 1978), American sports administrator
- Carlos Lee (born 1976), Panamanian professional baseball player
- Caspar Lee (born 1994), South African YouTuber
- Celine Lee (born 1994), Malaysian karateka
- Chae-rin Lee, also known as CL (born 1991), leader of South Korean pop group 2NE1
- Chang-ho Lee (born 1975), Korean Go player
- Charles Lee, multiple people
- Charlie Lee (computer scientist), Ivorian inventor of Litecoin
- Chase Lee (born 1998), American baseball player
- Chia-hao Lee (born 1999), Taiwanese badminton player
- Chittaphon Leechaiyapornkul (born 1996), Thai Singer and Part of NCT
- Chong Wei Lee (born 1982), Malaysian badminton player
- Christopher Lee, multiple people
- Christina Lee (born 1977), Hong Kong politician
- Christine Lee, multiple people
- Christian Lee, multiple people
- Christopher Lee (1922–2015), English actor
- Clara Lee (born 1985), South Korean actress and model
- Cliff Lee (born 1978), Major League Baseball pitcher
- Coco Lee (1975–2023), American singer
- Craig Lee (born 1977), Scottish professional golfer
- Colin Lee (born 1956), English football manager and footballer
- Courtney Lee (born 1985), NBA player

=== D ===
- Damion Lee (born 1992), American professional basketball player
- Daniel Lee, multiple people
- Danny Lee, several people
- Darron Lee (born 1994), American football player
- David Lee, multiple people
- Dean Lee (born 1971), American nuclear theorist, researcher and educator
- Denise Lee (born 1970), New Zealand politician
- Dennis Lee, multiple people
- Derek Lee, multiple people
- Derrick Todd Lee (1968–2016), American serial killer
- Desmond Lee (born 1976), Singaporean Cabinet Minister and Lawyer
- Diana Lee (born 1961), American model and actress
- Dinah Lee (born 1943), New Zealand singer
- Diane Lee (born 1959), Taiwanese politician
- Dijon Lee (born 2006), American football player
- Dion Lee (born 1985), American-Australian fashion designer
- Dino Lee (born 1993), Taiwanese singer, composer, musician and actor
- Dominic Lee (born 1984), Hong Kong politician
- Don Lee or Donald Lee, multiple people
- Dong-hae Lee (born 1986), member of Korean pop group Super Junior
- Dong-hyuck Lee Korean Singer, Part of K-pop Boy Group NCT
- Dorothy Lee, multiple people
- Doug Lee (born 1964), American basketball player
- Douglas Lee (born 1977), British choreographer
- Dylan Lee (born 1994), American baseball player

=== E ===
- Earl Lee (born 1983), Korean-Canadian conductor and cellist
- Ed Lee (1952–2017), American attorney and mayor of San Francisco, California
- Eddie Lee (1899–1979), American actor
- Edrick Lee (born 1992), Australian rugby league player
- Edwin Gray Lee (1836–1870), Confederate brigadier general in the American Civil War
- El Franco Lee (1949–2016), American politician
- Eliza Lee (1792–1864), American author
- Eliza Seymour Lee (c. 1800–1874), American pastry chef and restaurateur
- Elijah Lee (born 1996), American football linebacker
- Eleanor Agnes Lee (1841–1873), American diarist, poet, and daughter of Robert E. Lee
- Eric Lee, multiple people
- Erica Lee (1888–1981), English sculptor
- Esther Kim Lee (born 1970), American theatre historian
- Eugene Lee, multiple people
- Eun-ju Lee (1980–2005), South Korean actress
- Eung-kyung Lee (born 1966), Korean actress
- Eunice Lee (speed skater) (born 2004), American short track speed skater
- Eva Lee (badminton) (born 1986), Hong Kong-born American badminton player
- Eva K. Lee, Hong Kong-born American applied mathematician and operations researcher
- Eva Y.-H. P. Lee, Taiwanese molecular biologist
- Evea Lee (born 1986), American badminton player
- Evan Lee, multiple people
- Everett Lee (1916–2022), American conductor and violinist
- Ezra Lee (1749–1821), American colonial soldier
- Ezra Lee (born 1986), Australian singer-songwriter and pianist

=== F ===
- Felix Lee (born 2000) South Korean singer and actor, part of boy group Stray Kids
- Fitzhugh Lee (1835–1905), general, diplomat, and Governor of Virginia
- Floyd Lee (1933–2020), American blues musician
- Francis Lee, multiple people
- Frank Lee, multiple people
- Frankie Lee, multiple people
- Frederick Lee, multiple people

=== G ===
- G. Avery Lee (1916–2008), Baptist preacher in New Orleans
- Gary A. Lee (1933–2022), American politician
- Gavin Lee (born 1971), English actor
- Geddy Lee, Canadian rock music bass guitarist and singer
- George Lee, multiple people
- Georgia Lee, multiple people
- Gerald Lee (born 1987), Finnish basketball player
- Gerald Bruce Lee (born 1952), judge on the United States District Court
- Gerald Stanley Lee (1862–1944), American Congregational clergyman and author
- Gideon Lee (1778–1841), American politician
- Gin Lee (born 1987), Malaysian singer
- Gordon Lee, multiple people
- Grace Lee (politician), politician in New York
- Gary Lee, multiple people
- Grace Etsuko Lee, founder of Grace Lee International
- Graham Lee, multiple people
- Grant Lee (born 2001), Australian footballer
- Greg Lee (basketball) (1951–2022), American basketball player
- Greta Lee (born 1983), American actress
- Guy Lee (1918–2005), British scholar and poet
- Gwen Lee (1904–1961), American actress

=== H ===
- Hacken Lee (born 1967), Hong Kong singer and actor
- Hannah Harrison Ludwell Lee (1701–1750), American colonist
- Hao-Yu Lee (born 2003), Taiwanese baseball player
- Harold B. Lee (1899–1973) 11th President of The Church of Jesus Christ of Latter-day Saints
- Harper Lee (1926–2016), American novelist
- Harry Lee (sheriff) (1932–2007), Chinese-American sheriff of Jefferson Parish, Louisiana
- Haruna Lee, Taiwanese Japanese American theatre maker and writer
- Hazel Ying Lee (1912–1944), American pilot
- Heidi Lee, American Couture Hat fashion designer
- Helen Lee, multiple people
- Henry Lee, multiple people
- Herbert Lee, multiple people
- Heung-kam Lee (1932–2021), Hong Kong actress
- Hoi-chuen Lee (1901–1965), Chinese Opera singer and actor, father of Bruce Lee
- Ho-won Lee or Ho-Dong Lee, Korean rapper, singer, former dancer of boyband Infinite
- Holly Lee (born 1953), Hong Kong artist-photographer
- Howard Lee, multiple people
- Howie Lee (1929–2014), Canadian ice hockey player
- Hubert L. Lee (1915–1982), American Medal of Honor recipient
- Hye-in Lee (born 2008) South Korean Pop singer and model, Member of Girl Group NewJeans
- Hyo-ri Lee (born 1979), Korean pop singer, actress, model
- Hyuk-jae Lee (born 1973), Korean comedian

=== I ===
- Ian Lee (1914–1976), Australian cricketer
- Ian James Lee (born 1984), American journalist
- Iain Lee (born 1973), English broadcaster, writer, television presenter, and stand-up comedian
- Ida Lee (1865–1943), Australian historian and poet
- Inkyu Lee, Korean engineer
- Isaac Lee (born 1971), Colombian journalist, entrepreneur and film & television producer
- Isabella Lee (born 1997), Taiwanese footballer
- Isaiah Lee (born 1999), Trinidadian footballer
- Ivan Lee (born 1981), Olympic saber fencer; banned for life by SafeSport
- Ivy Lee (1877–1934), American publicist
- Ivy Lee (born 1973), Singaporean former actress and host

=== J ===
- Jae Lee (born 1972), American comic book artist
- Jae-Dong Lee (born 1990), professional StarCraft player
- James Lee, multiple people
- Jang-woo Lee (born 1986), Korean actor and singer
- Jayden Lee (born 1993), an American nude model, fetish model, stripper and pornographic actress
- Jason Lee (born 1970), English field hockey player and coach
- Jason Lee (born 1970), American actor
- Jason Scott Lee (born 1966), Asian American film actor
- Jeanette Lee (born 1971), American pocket billiards player, a.k.a. "The Black Widow"
- Jeannette Lee (music executive), British music record executive, former member of Public Image Ltd; co-owner of Rough Trade Records
- Jeannette H. Lee, founder of Sytel, Inc.
- Jennie Lee (1848–1925), American stage and silent film actress
- Jennie Lee (c.1854–1930), British stage actress
- Je-no Lee (born 2000), Korean rapper and singer, Member of boy band NCT
- Ji-ah Lee (born 1978), Korean actress
- Jim Lee (born 1964), Korean American comic book artist and publisher
- Jin-ki Lee, stage name Onew (born 1989), leader and vocalist of South Korean boy band SHINee
- John A. Lee (1891–1982), New Zealand politician and writer
- John B. Lee (born 1951), Canadian author and poet who is presently Poet Laureate of Brantford, Ontario
- John 'Babbacombe' Lee (1864–1945), English murderer
- John C. H. Lee (1887–1958), U.S. Army General
- J. J. Lee (born 1942), Irish historian and former senator
- John Lee Ka-chiu (born 1957), Chief Executive of Hong Kong
- John Lee, multiple people
- John Lee, Baron Lee of Trafford (born 1942), British Liberal Democrat politician
- John L. G. Lee (1869–1952), American politician and lawyer
- John Rafter Lee, actor/voice actor, best known for his portrayal of Trevor Goodchild in Peter Chung's Æon Flux
- Johnson Lee (born 1974), Hong Kong entertainer
- Jonathan Lee (born1958), Taiwanese singer and producer
- Jong-Ho Lee (born 1966), Korean engineer
- Jong-hyun Lee (born 1990), member of Korean boy band CNBLUE
- Jonna Lee (born 1981), Swedish singer
- Joon Lee or Chang-sun Lee (born 1988), member of Korean boy band MBLAQ
- Joseph Lee (1876–1949), Scottish poet, journalist and artist
- Jun-ho Lee (born 1990), member of Korean pop group 2PM
- Julia Denise Lee, also known as Denise Julia (born 2002), Filipino singer-songwriter

=== K ===
- Kai-Fu Lee (born 1961), American information technology executive and founding president of Google China
- Kam Lee, American death metal Massacre singer
- Kayin Lee (born 2004), American football player
- Keiran Lee (born 1984), British pornographic actor, director and producer
- Khalil Lee (born 1998), American baseball player
- Kieran Lee (born 1988), English footballer for Sheffield Wednesday F.C.
- Korey Lee (born 1998), American baseball player

=== L ===
- Laetitia Corbin Lee (1657–1706), American colonist
- Larisa Lee, Australian politician
- Larry Lee (born 1959), American college baseball coach
- Lauranett Lee (born 1956), American historian, educator, and curator
- Laurel Lee (born 1974), American politician
- Laurie Lee (1914–1997), English poet, novelist, and screenwriter
- Leapy Lee (born 1939), English pop singer
- Lee family (Singapore), Singaporean political family
- Lee-Hamblin family, U.S. political family
- Leonard Lee (1938–2016), Canadian entrepreneur
- Leonard Leroy Lee (born 1933), birthname of American actor Robert Fuller
- Leonidas Lee (1860–1912), Major League Baseball player in 1877
- Lettice Lee (1731–1776), colonial American socialite
- Lila Lee (1905–1973), American actress
- Linda Lee (born 1947), Canadian bridge player
- Liz Lee (politician), American politician from Minnesota
- Logan Lee (born 2000), American football player
- Loretta Lee (1913–1977), American singer
- Louise Lee (born 1950), Hong Kong actress
- Loziene J. Lee (1907–1999), American politician

=== M ===
- Mark Lee (born 1956), Canadian television sportscaster
- Mark Lee (born 1999), Canadian entertainer and member of K-pop boy group NCT
- Mark Lee Kok Huang (born 1968), Singaporean comedian, actor, television host and film director
- Marqise Lee (born 1991), American football player
- Martin Lee, multiple people
- Martin Lee Ka-shing (born 1971), director of Hong Kong and China Gas
- Mary Lee, multiple people
- Matthew Lee, multiple people
- Matty Lee (born 1998), British Olympic diver
- Maureen Lee (1932–2020), British writer
- McDowell Lee (1925–2014), American politician
- Mela Lee, American voice actress
- Michele Lee (born 1942), American actress, singer, dancer, producer and director
- Mike Lee (born 1971), U.S. Senator from Utah
- Mildred Childe Lee (1846–1905), daughter of Robert E. Lee
- Monte Lee (born 1977), American college baseball coach
- Muna Lee (born 1981), American Olympic sprinter
- Min-ho Lee (born 1998), South Korean K-pop idol from the group Stray kids

=== N ===
- Noël Lee (1924–2013), American classical pianist and composer living in Paris

=== O ===
- Opal Lee (born 1926), described by AARP as grandmother of Juneteenth (June 19, USA)
- Otho S. Lee (1840–1918), American politician and lawyer
- Oudious Lee (born 1956), American football player

=== P ===
- Paris Lee (born 1995), American basketball player
- Patrick Lee, multiple people
- Paul Lee, multiple people
- Peggy Lee (1920–2002), American singer
- Peter Lee (cricketer) (1945–2026), English cricketer
- Peter Lee Jung-sum (1939–2008), former assistant director of Hong Kong Observatory, elder brother of Bruce Lee.
- Peter Lee Ka-kit (born 1963), vice-chairman and managing director of Henderson Land Development
- Peyton Elizabeth Lee (born 2004), American actress
- Phillip Lee, multiple people
- Pinky Lee (1907–1993), American comic and 1950s children's TV host
- Poy Gum Lee (1900–1968), Chinese-American architect
- Pui Fan Lee (born 1969/70), English actress and television presenter

=== Q ===
- Quentin Oliver Lee (1988–2022), American actor

=== R ===
- Ralph Lee (1935–2023), American puppet-maker
- Rex E. Lee (1935–1996), U.S. Solicitor General
- Richard Lee, multiple people
- Ricky Lee (American football) (born 1999), American football player
- Rita Lee (1947–2023), Brazilian (with American ancestry) Rock singer/composer
- Rob Lee (born 1966), English footballer
- Robert Lee, multiple people
- Robert E. Lee (1807–1870), Confederate general in the American Civil War
- Robert E. Lee (1918–1994), American playwright
- Ronald B. Lee (1932–2020), American Postal Service worker
- Rustie Lee (born 1949), British-Jamaican chef, actor and musician
- Ruta Lee (born 1935), American actress and dancer, real name Ruta Mary Kilmonis
- Ryker Lee (born 2006), American ice hockey player

=== S ===
- Sam Lee (actor) (born 1975), Hong Kong actor
- Sammy Lee (footballer) (born 1959), English football player and manager
- Samuel Phillips Lee (1812–1897), Union admiral in the American Civil War
- Sean Lee (born 1986), American football player
- Shane Lee (disambiguation), multiple people
- Sharon Lee (disambiguation), several people
- Sheila Jackson Lee (1950–2024), American politician
- Sheryl Lee (born 1967), American actress
- Simon Lee, multiple people
- Sondra Lee (1930–2026), American actress and dancer
- Sook-Yin Lee, Canadian musician, filmmaker, actor and media personality
- Sophie Lee (born 1968), Australian actress
- Spencer Lee (born 1998), American freestyle and folkstyle wrestler
- Spike Lee (born 1957), African-American movie director
- Stan Lee (1922–2018), American comic book writer, editor, former president and chairman of Marvel Comics
- Stephen Lee, multiple people
- Steven Lee, multiple people
- Stewart Lee (born 1968), English comedian and writer
- Stewart Lee (1885–1960), English cricketer
- Summer Lee (born 1987), American politician from Pennsylvania
- Sunisa Lee (born 2003), American gymnast
- Susie Lee (born 1966), American politician from Nevada
- Lee Soonkyu (born 1989), Korean popstar known as Sunny Lee
- Suk-chae Lee (born 1945), Korean businessman

=== T ===
- Lee Tae-yong (born 1995), Korean Rapper and Singer, Part of K-pop Boy Group NCT
- Ta Sung Lee, Taiwanese engineer
- Taku Lee (born 1995), Japanese gridiron football player
- Terry Lee (born 1940), Australian cricketer and oenologist
- Tim Berners-Lee (born 1955), English inventor of the World Wide Web and director of World Wide Web Consortium
- Tim Lee, several people
- Lee Tien-yu (1946–2024), Air Force general and defense minister of the Republic of China (Taiwan)
- Lee Tim-shing (born 1949), Hong Kong television producer
- Tommy Lee (born 1962), American heavy metal musician

=== U ===
- Ulysses G. Lee (1913–1969), American soldier and professor

=== V ===
- Valerie Lee Shepard (1931–2026), American actress
- Vernon Lee, pseudonym of British writer Violet Paget (1856–1935)
- Vincent Lee Chuan Leong, Singaporean kidnapper
- Vindy Lee (born 1983), Indonesian celebrity chef
- Victoria Lee (2004–2022), American mixed martial artist

=== W ===
- William Lee (American judge), American judge and Alabama state legislator
- William Lee (valet), (c.1750–1810) American slave and revolutionary
- William C. Lee (1895–1948), American U.S. Army soldier and general
- William Henry Fitzhugh Lee (1837–1891), Confederate cavalry general, planter, and member of the U.S. Congress
- Willis A. Lee, Jr. (1888–1945), U.S. Navy admiral in World War II
- William Mack Lee (1835–1932), American fraudster

=== Y ===
- Yong Lee, American political scientist
- Young-Pyo Lee (born 1997), South Korean footballer
- Yuan Tseh Lee (born 1936), Taiwanese chemist and Nobel prize winner in chemistry 1986

=== Z ===
- Zii Jia Lee (born 1998), Malaysian badminton player

== Fictional characters ==
- Annabel Lee, title character in Edgar Allan Poe's 1849 elegiac poem
- Agent Marcia Lee, a character from the DC Animated Universe
- Bill Lee (Stargate), in the science fiction television series Stargate SG-1
- Chief Inspector Lee, played by Jackie Chan in the Rush Hour film series
- Chung Su-Lee, the Chinese student in Mind Your Language, played by Pik-Sen Lim
- Gaeun Lee, a protagonist in the South Korean animated series The Haunted House
- Gregg Lee, from the video game Night in the Woods
- Jann Lee, in the Dead or Alive video game series
- Juniper Lee, from the animated series The Life and Times of Juniper Lee
- Meilin Lee, the protagonist of the 2022 Pixar film Turning Red
- Michelle Lee (NCIS), from American TV series NCIS
- Nelson Lee (detective), detective in British story papers, created in 1894
- Rock Lee, from the anime/manga series Naruto
  - Metal Lee, son of Rock Lee who appears in Boruto: Naruto Next Generations
- Lee Chaolan, in the Tekken games
- Lee Rosen, a main character in the TV Series Alphas
- The Lee Brothers, the main characters from Double Dragon
- Zoe Lee, a character from Miraculous: Tales of Ladybug & Cat Noir

== See also ==
- List of people with the Korean family name Lee
- Lee (English surname), a common English surname
- Lee (Chinese surname) or Li, several Chinese surnames
  - Lee (surname 李) or Li (Hanzi 李), a common Chinese surname
  - Lee (surname 利) or Li (Hanzi 利), a common Chinese surname
- Lee (Korean surname) or Rhee or Yi (Hanja 李, Hangul 리 or 이), a common Korean surname derived from the Chinese (李 "Lee" or "Li")
- Lee (given name)
- Lee (disambiguation)
- Vaughan-Lee, a surname
