= Frederick Lee =

Frederick, Frederic, Fred, or Freddie Lee may refer to:

== Arts and entertainment ==
- Frederick Richard Lee (1798–1879), English painter
- Freddie "Fingers" Lee (1937–2014), British singer, guitarist and pianist
- Frederick Lee (actor) (born 1976), Malaysian actor
- Freddie Lee Peterkin, American singer–songwriter and actor

== Sports ==
- Frederick Lee (cricketer, born 1840) (1840–1922), English cricketer
- Frederic Hugh Lee (1855–1924), English international rugby union player
- Frederick Lee (cricketer, born 1856) (1856–1896), English cricketer
- Fred Lee (cricketer, born 1871) (1871–1914), English cricketer
- Fred Lee (cricketer, born 1905) (1905–1977), English cricketer

== Others ==
- Frederick Lee (priest) (1832–1902), Church of England priest and author
- Frederic Schiller Lee (1859–1939), American physiologist
- Frederick Lee, Baron Lee of Newton (1906–1984), British politician
- Frederic Sterling Lee (1949–2014), American economist
- Fred C. Lee, American engineer

== See also ==
- Frederick Lee Bridell (1830–1863), English painter
- Fred Li (born 1955), Hong Kong politician
- Lee Frederick, American actor active in the 1950s
