= Lee (English surname) =

Surname originated in England

Lee is a common surname in the English-speaking countries.

In Canada, "Lee" was the 7th-most-common surname outside of Quebec. In the United States during the 2000 census, "Lee" was the 22nd-most-common surname.

== Origins ==
=== England ===
There are several distinct origins of the Lee surname. The most common is derived from Old English lēah, meaning a meadow or forest clearing.

This developed variously into the surnames Lee, Lea, and Leigh.

=== Ireland ===
The name in Ireland has several diverse origins, resulting in widely dispersed clusters of the name in South Western, Western (Galway) and North Eastern Counties. One recognized root was the anglicization of the Irish surname "Ó Laoidigh" which resulted in several variants, such as Lee, Lea, and Maclee. Other Lees have English roots and still others may have derived from the Norman "Du Lea". The 1901 Irish census list 4912 entries primarily in Galway, Dublin, Cork, Antrim, Limerick and Down counties.

=== Norway ===
Originating from Norway as "Lie", this surname was altered when it arrived in the Americas in the late 1800s to fit the English language's pronunciation.

== Places ==
Several places in the US have been named for the various famous people named Lee:

=== United States ===
- Lee, Massachusetts
- Lee, New Hampshire
- Lee's Summit, Missouri
- various Fort Lees
- various Leesburgs
- various Leesvilles
- Washington and Lee University
- Lee Township, Michigan
- Lee Township, Minnesota
- Lee County, Florida

== See also ==
- Lee (given name)
- List of persons with the surname Lee
- Lea (surname) and Leigh (surname), for related English surnames
- Li (surname), for numerous East Asian surnames romanized "Li"
  - Li (李), for the most common one
  - Lee (Korean name), for its Korean variants
  - Lý (Vietnamese name)
