= Gary Lee =

Gary Lee may refer to:

- Gary A. Lee (1933–2022), U.S. Representative from New York
- Gary Yia Lee (born 1949), Hmong anthropologist and author based in Australia
- Gary Lee (American football) (born 1965), played for the Detroit Lions
- Gary Lee (artist), Australian artist, winner of the 2022 NATSIAA Telstra Works on Paper Award
- Gary Lee (journalist) (born 1956), wrote for Time and the Washington Post
- Gary Lee (politician) (born 1947), American politician in North Dakota
- Gary Lee (footballer) (born 1966), English footballer
- Harith Gary Lee (born 1964), Singaporean convicted of murdering his girlfriend in 2003
- Geddy Lee (born 1953), Canadian musician, born Gary Lee Weinrib
