= Fireside =

Fireside may refer to:

- The area near a domestic fireplace or a fire ring
- Fireside (LDS Church), an evening meeting in the Church of Jesus Christ of Latter-day Saints (LDS Church)
- Fireside (apple), an apple cultivar
- Fireside (band), Swedish rock band

== Places ==
- Fireside, British Columbia, a community in Canada
- Fireside, Ohio, a community in the United States

== See also ==
- Fireside poets, group of 19th-century U.S. poets from New England
- Fireside Books, publishing imprint of Simon & Schuster
- The Fireside Bowl, concert venue in Chicago, Illinois
- Fireside chats, evening radio talks given by U.S. President F. D. Roosevelt
- Fireside Favourites (1980), album by Fad Gadget
- The Fireside Girls, a group of female protagonists in the TV cartoon Phineas and Ferb
- Fireside Theatre (1949–1958), U.S. TV anthology drama series on NBC
- By the Fireside, pseudonym for UK musical artist Daniel Lea
- Marvel Fireside Books (1974–1979), series of Marvel comics reprinted by Fireside Books
- Farm & Fireside (1878–1939), American magazine that became Country Home
