= Howard Lee =

Howard Lee may refer to:

- Howard Lee (sailor) (1935–2012), Bermudian Olympic sailor
- Howard Nathaniel Lee (born 1934), North Carolina politician
- Howard B. Lee (1879–1985), West Virginia attorney general
- Howard V. Lee (1933–2019), U.S. Medal of Honor recipient
- M. Howard Lee (1937–2016), Korean-born American physicist
- Howie Lee (1931–2014), Canadian ice hockey player
- W. Howard Lee (1908–1981), spouse of Hedy Lamarr and then Gene Tierney
- A pseudonym of Ron Goulart

== See also ==
- Howard Leigh (disambiguation)
