= Lee Gordon =

Lee Gordon may refer to:

- Lee Gordon (promoter) (1923-1963), American and Australian music promoter
  - Lee Gordon (music label), Australian record label, later known as Leedon
- Lee Gordon (musician) (1902-1946), American jazz musician
- Lee Gordon, character in the film Red Ball Express

== See also ==
- Leo Gordon, (1922-2000) American actor
- Leon Gordon (disambiguation)
- Gordon Lee (disambiguation)
