= Christine Lee =

Christine Lee may refer to:

- Christine Lee (academic) (born 1943), British academic
- Christine Lee (actress), Hong Kong actress
- Christine Lee (archaeologist), Taiwanese American archaeologist
- Christine Lee (lawyer), British lawyer accused of political interference
- Christine Hyung-Oak Lee, American writer
- Christine Peng-Peng Lee (born 1993), Canadian gymnast

== See also ==
- Christina Lee, Hong Kong politician
- Christina Lee (producer), American producer and screenwriter
- Christopher Lee (disambiguation)
