= Philip Lee =

Phil, Phillip or Philip Lee may refer to:

== Music ==
- Philip John Lee (1944–2010), English flamenco guitarist
- Phil Lee (1943–2024), English jazz guitarist

== Military and politics ==
- Philip Corbin Lee (1681–1744), Colonial American naval officer, justice, sheriff, member of Maryland Upper House and King's Council
- Philip Ludwell Lee (1727-1775), Colonial American naval officer, lawyer, planter, burgess and member of Virginia Governor's Council, nephew of Philip Corbin Lee
- Philip R. Lee (1924-2020), American physician; Assistant Health Secretary
- Philip S. Lee (born 1944), Canadian politician; Lieutenant Governor of Manitoba
- Phillip Lee (politician) (born 1970), former UK Liberal Democrat member of Parliament, formerly elected as a Conservative

== Religion ==
- Philip Lee, English Archdeacon of Salop in 1398
- Phillip Lee Jr. (born 1963), American minister and admiral; entered military service in 1982

== Sport ==
- Philip Lee (cricketer) (1904–1980), Australian cricketer
- Philip Lee Fai Lap (born 1950), Hong Kong football manager during 2013–14 Hong Kong Rangers FC season
- Phillip Lee (rugby league) (born 1977), Australian forward and hooker

== Other ==
- Philip Lee (valet) (b. 1780s), enslaved at Arlington House in Virginia

== See also ==
- Philip Lee Williams (born 1950), American novelist, poet, and essayist
- Lee Phillip (born 1981), Korean American actor
- Lee Phillips (disambiguation)
