= Lee Phillips =

Lee Phillips may refer to the following people:

- Lee Phillips (footballer, born 1979), Welsh-born footballer
- Lee Phillips (footballer, born 1980), English footballer
- Lee H. Phillips (Lee Hugh Phillips, 1930–1950), American Medal of Honor recipient
- L. Lee Phillips, entertainment lawyer with Manatt, Phelps & Phillips

== See also ==
- Philip Lee (disambiguation)
- Lee Philips (1927–1999), American actor and director
- Grant-Lee Phillips (born 1963), American singer-songwriter
- Lee Phillip Bell (1928–2020), American talk show host as Lee Phillip
- Lee Phillip (born 1981), Korean-American actor
