= Frank Lee =

Frank or Frankie Lee may refer to:

- Frank Lee (British politician) (1867–1941), British Labour Party politician
- Frank Lee (cricketer) (1905–1982), English cricketer
- Frank H. Lee (1873–1952), U.S. Representative from Missouri
- Frank Lee (rugby league) (1880–1949), rugby league footballer who played in the 1900s and 1910s for England, Lancashire, St Helens RLFC, and York
- Frank Godbould Lee (1903–1971), British public servant and Master of Corpus Christi College, Cambridge
- Frank Lee, the stage name for Lee Tung Foo
- Frankie Lee (actor) (1911–1970), American child actor
- Frankie Lee (blues musician) (1941–2015), American soul blues and electric blues singer and songwriter
- Frankie Lee (Americana musician) (born 1982), American singer-songwriter, multi-instrumentalist and record producer

== See also ==
- Francis Lee (disambiguation)
- Frank Lees (1931–1999), English chemical engineer
