= Derrick Lee =

Derrick Lee is the name of:

- Derrick Todd Lee (1968–2016), convicted serial killer
- Derrick Lee (rugby union) (born 1973), retired Scottish rugby union player

== See also ==
- Derrek Lee (born 1975), Major League Baseball first baseman
- Derek Lee (disambiguation)
