= Dennis Leigh =

Dennis Leigh may refer to:

- Dennis Leigh, real name of English musician John Foxx (born 1948)
- Dennis Leigh (footballer) (born 1949), English footballer

== See also ==
- Dennis Lee (disambiguation)
