= Stephen Lee =

Stephen Lee, Steven Lee or Steve Lee may refer to:

== Entertainment ==
- Stephen Lee (actor) (1955–2014), American actor
- Steve Lee (singer) (1963–2010), Swiss singer with Gotthard
- Steve Lee (hunter) (born 1967), Australian singer/songwriter and pro-gun activist
- Stephen Lee (TV presenter) (born 1972), English TV presenter
- Steven Lee (music producer) (born 1983), Korean-American music producer
- Steve Lee (songwriter), British songwriter
- Steve Lee, singer and musician with Cathedral Quartet

== Sports ==
- Stephen Lee (American football) (born c. 1971), American college football coach
- Stephen Lee (ice hockey) (born 1990), English ice hockey player
- Stephen Lee (snooker player) (born 1974), English snooker player
- Stephen Lee (speed skater) (born 1978), Australian ice speed skater
- Steven Lee (born 1962), Australian alpine skier

== Other ==
- Stephen D. Lee (1833–1908), American Civil War general
- Steven Lee (astronomer), amateur astronomer from New South Wales, Australia
- Steven Lee (optometrist), inventor of online eye exams, founder of Visibly, CEO of VisionPros
- Stephen Lee (chemist) (born 1955), American chemistry professor at Cornell University
- Stephen Lee (bishop) (born 1956), Roman Catholic priest, bishop of Macau
- Stephen Lee (South African activist) (born c. 1951), South African apartheid era political activist, who escaped from the high-security Pretoria Central Prison with Tim Jenkin
- Steve Lee (chaplain), American chaplain and former law enforcement officer
- Stephen Lee Hock Khoon, Singaporean convicted murderer

== See also ==
- Stephen Leigh (born 1951), American science fiction and fantasy writer
