= Simon Lee =

Simon Lee may refer to:

- Simon Lee (conductor), conductor and musical supervisor
- Simon Lee (academic) (born 1957), former Vice-Chancellor of Leeds Metropolitan University
- Simon Lee (businessman) (born 1961), British business executive
- Simon Lee (artist), Brooklyn-based, British born artist
