= Fred Lee (cricketer, born 1905) =

English cricketer (1905–1977)

Frederick George Lee (24 May 1905 – 19 November 1977) played first-class cricket in 10 matches for Somerset between 1925 and 1927. He was born at Chard, Somerset and died at Taunton, also in Somerset.

Fred Lee was the second cricketer of this name to play for Somerset: he was not related to the earlier Fred Lee, and nor was he related to Frank Lee and Jack Lee, the London-born brothers who were his near-contemporaries in the Somerset side.

Lee was a tail-end batsman and a bowler, though neither his batting nor his bowling style is recorded. He recorded his best bowling figures in his first match, with three wickets for 103 runs against Yorkshire in 1925, and his score of eight in Somerset's first innings was also the highest of his short career.
