= Daniel Lee =

Daniel Lee is the name of:

- Daniel Armand Lee (born 1980), South Korean hip hop artist, songwriter and lyricist
- Daniel Curtis Lee (born 1991), American actor
- Daniel Lewis Lee (1973–2020), American convicted murderer
- Dan M. Lee (1926–2010), Chief Justice of the Supreme Court of Mississippi
- Daniel W. Lee (1919–1985), American Army officer and Medal of Honor recipient
- Daniel Lee (designer) (born 1986), creative director at Burberry
- Daniel Lee (film director) (born 1960), Hong Kong film director
- Daniel Lee (Oregon missionary), Methodist missionary in Oregon
- Daniel Lee (politician) (1830–?), American politician
- Daniel Lee (swimmer) (born 1990), Sri Lankan swimmer, competitor at the 2008 Summer Olympics
- Daniel Lee (triathlete) (born 1977), Olympic triathlete from Hong Kong
- Daniel Lee Chee Hun (born 1982), Malaysian musician

== See also ==
- Dan Lee (animator) (1969–2005), Canadian animator
- Danny Lee (disambiguation)
- Daniel Leigh, Sir Daniel Leigh, 1st Baronet (died 1633)
- Daniel Lea, musician, commonly known as By the Fireside
