= Danny Lee =

Danny Lee may refer to:

== Arts and entertainment ==
- Danny Lee (actor) (born 1952), Hong Kong actor, film producer, writer and director
- Danny Lee (filmmaker) (born 1978), American film director, writer and editor
- Danny Lee (special effects artist) (1919–2014), Academy Award-winning visual effects artist

== Sports ==
- Danny Lee (boxer) (born 1940), Scottish boxer
- Danny Lee (rugby league) (born 1965), Australian rugby league footballer
- Danny Lee (rugby union) (born 1976), New Zealand rugby union footballer
- Danny Lee (golfer) (born 1990), Korean-New Zealand golfer

== See also ==
- Daniel Lee (disambiguation)
- Danni Leigh (born 1970), American country music singer
- Danny Le or Shiphtur (born 1993), Canadian League of Legends player
