= Arthur Lee =

Arthur Lee may refer to:

- Arthur Lee (diplomat) (1740–1792), US envoy to France; prominent member if the Lee family of Virginia
- Arthur Tracy Lee (1814–1879), U.S. Army Colonel, painter, and author
- Arthur Lee, 1st Viscount Lee of Fareham (1868–1947), British soldier and diplomat
- Arthur Lee (British Army officer) (1877–1954), British Army officer
- Arthur Lee (sculptor) (1881–1961), American sculptor
- Arthur Lee (RAF officer) (1894–1975), Royal Air Force Air Vice-Marshal
- Arthur Lee (cricketer, born 1913) (1913–1983), English cricketer and judge
- Arthur Lee (cricketer, born 1849) (1849–1925), English cricketer and clergyman
- Arthur Lee (musician) (1945–2006), American psychedelic-rock musician
- Art Lee (born 1947), Canadian politician and lawyer
- Arthur Lee (basketball) (born 1977), US-born European basketball player

== See also ==
- Arthur Li (born 1945), Hong Kong councillor
- Arthur Lees (disambiguation)
- Arthur Leigh (died 1638) of the Leigh baronets
