= Howard Leigh =

Howard Leigh may refer to:

- Howard Leigh (broadcaster) (born 1935), Australian radio personality and sports journalist,
- Howard Leigh, Baron Leigh of Hurley (born 1959), British businessman and politician
