= Francis Leigh =

Francis Leigh may refer to:

- Sir Francis Leigh (MP for Oxford) (1579–1625), English MP for Oxford
- Francis Leigh, 1st Earl of Chichester (1598–1653), Baronet, courtier and Royalist MP for Warwick
- Francis Leigh (MP for Kent) (c. 1651–1711), English MP for Kent
- Francis Leigh (MP for Kildare) (fl. 1663–1692), Irish Jacobite politician
- Francis Leigh (MP for Wexford) (1758–1839), MP for Wexford and New Ross
- Francis Leigh (died 1644) (1592–1644), English politician
- Francis Leigh, 3rd Baron Leigh, British peer and Warwickshire landowner

== See also ==
- Francis Lee (disambiguation)
