= Christopher Lee (disambiguation) =

Christopher Lee (1922–2015) was an English actor and singer.

Christopher Lee or Chris Lee may also refer to:

== Entertainment ==
=== Acting ===
- Chris Lee Chih-cheng (born 1981), Taiwanese model and actor
- Christopher Lee (Singaporean actor), Malaysian-born Singaporean actor
- Chris Lee, an actor from the season 2 cast of Tracker (American TV series)

=== Music ===
- Chris Lee or Li Yuchun (born 1984), Chinese singer
  - Chris Lee (Li Yuchun album)
- Chris Lee or Krasp (born 1975), American musician and drummer for downset.

=== Behind the scenes ===
- Chris Lee (producer) (born c.1956), film producer and former head of Columbia/TriStar
- Chris Chan Lee, Asian American filmmaker
- Chris Lee or Lee Sung-soo (born 1979), SM Entertainment CEO and A&R executive

== Politics ==
- Chris Lee Chun Kit (born 1982), Malaysian politician
- Chris Lee (Hawaii politician) (born 1981), Democratic member of the Hawaii Senate and former member of Hawaii House of Representatives
- Chris Lee (New York politician) (born 1964), former U.S. congressman from New York and manufacturing executive

== Sports ==
- Chris Lee (ice hockey) (born 1980), Canadian hockey defenceman
- Chris Lee (referee) (born 1970), National Hockey League referee
- Chris Lee (cricketer) (born 1971), New Zealand cricketer
- Christopher Lee (soccer) (born 2001), Canadian soccer player
- Chris Lee (footballer) (born 1971), English footballer

== Other ==
- Christopher Lee (activist) (1964–2012), Asian-American transgender activist and filmmaker from the San Francisco Bay Area
- Christopher Lee (chef), American chef
- Christopher Lee (historian) (1941–2021), writer, historian and broadcaster
- Christopher David Lee (born 1947), Australian writer

== See also ==
- Chris Lea, Canadian political activist
- Christian Lee (disambiguation)
- Christine Lee (disambiguation)
