= Sharon Lee =

Sharon Lee may refer to:

- Sharon Lee (judoka) (born 1963), British Olympic judoka
- Sharon Lee (writer) (born 1952), American writer
- Sharon G. Lee (born 1953), justice on the Tennessee Supreme Court
- Sharon Lee (singer) (born 1988), Hong Kong singer
- Sharon Lee (sport shooter) (born 1976), English Commonwealth Games medallist
- Sharon Lee (politician), acting borough president of Queens, in New York City

== See also ==
- Sharon Lee Myers (born 1941), birth name of American singer-songwriter Jackie DeShannon
- Sharon-Lee Lane, Australian country music singer
