= Derek Lee =

Derek Lee or Derrek Lee may refer to:

- Derrek Lee (born 1975), former Major League Baseball first baseman from 1997 to 2011
- Derek Lee (baseball) (born 1966), former Major League Baseball outfielder in 1993
- Derek Lee (American football) (born 1981), wide receiver
- Derek Lee (politician) (born 1948), lawyer and politician in Canada
- Derek Lee (biologist) (born 1971), ecologist
- Derek Lee, character in the film Afflicted

== See also ==
- Derrick Lee (disambiguation)
- Derek Lee Nixon (born 1983), American actor
- Derek Lee Ragin (born 1958), American countertenor
- Derek Lee Shelton (born 1970), American baseball player and coach
