= Arthur Lees (disambiguation) =

Arthur Lees (1908–1992) was an English golfer.

Arthur Lees may also refer to:

- Arthur Lees (rugby) (1874–?), English rugby union and rugby league footballer who played in the 1890s and 1900s
- Sir Arthur Lees, 5th Baronet (1863–1949), of the Lees baronets

== See also ==
- Arthur Lee (disambiguation)
