= Martyn Lee =

Martyn Lee may refer to:

- Martyn Lee (broadcaster) (born 1978), British radio broadcaster
- Martyn Lee (footballer) (born 1980), English former footballer

== See also ==
- Martin Lee (disambiguation)
