= Eugene Lee =

Eugene Lee may refer to:

- Eugene "Porky" Lee (1933–2005), American child actor
- Eugene Lee (actor) (born 1953), African-American actor
- Eugene Lee (designer) (1939–2023), American set designer
- Eugene Lee (entrepreneur), American businessman
- Eugene Lee (sports agent) (born 1973), sports agent and lawyer
- Lee Eugene (born 2004), South Korean actor

== See also ==
- Eugene Lee-Hamilton (1845–1907), English poet
