= Fort Lee =

Fort Lee may refer to:

- Fort Lee, New Jersey, United States
  - Fort Lee High School
  - Fort Lee Historic Park, site of an American Revolutionary War fort and 1776 battle
  - Fort Lee Museum, a history museum
- Fort Lee (Salem, Massachusetts), site of an American Revolutionary War fort
- Fort Lee, Virginia, formerly Fort Gregg-Adams, a US Army post
  - Fort Lee Air Force Station, 1956–1983
- SS Fort Lee, a World War II tanker ship
