= Leon Gordon (disambiguation) =

Leon Gordon (1830–1892, Judah Leib Gordon) was a Hebrew poet.

Leon Gordon may also refer to:

- Leon Gordon (athlete) (born 1974), Jamaican sprinter
- Leon Gordon (painter) (1889–1943), American portrait and landscape painter
- Leon Gordon (playwright) (1894–1960), English playwright
