= Danny Lee (filmmaker) =

American filmmaker

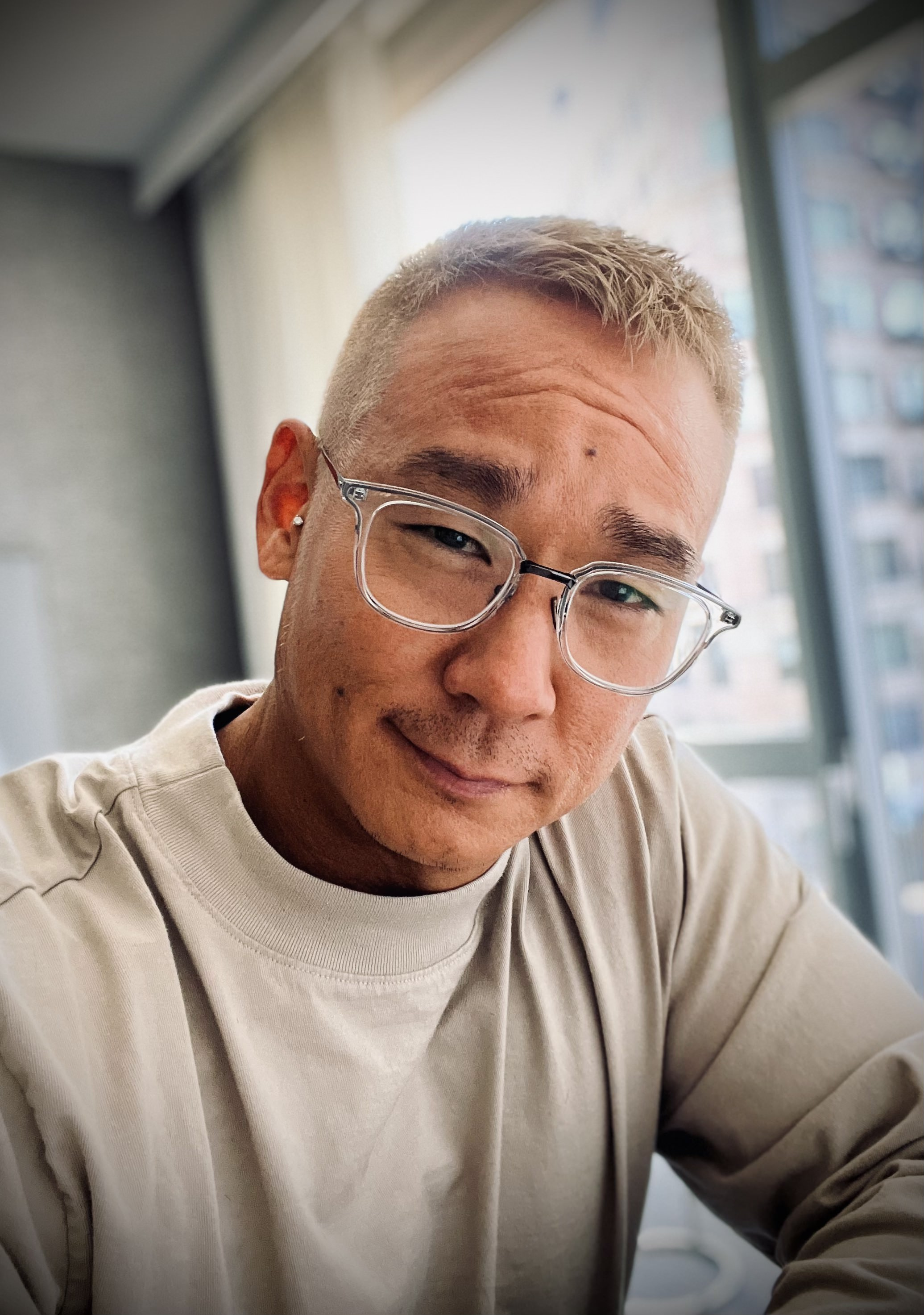
- Born: Los Angeles, California
- Education: University of California, Santa Barbara
- Occupations: Film director, screenwriter, producer
- Writing career
- Years active: 2000–present
- Genres: Documentary, Drama, Inspirational, Black Comedy
- Subjects: Culture, Arts, Music, Sports, Fashion, Pop Culture
- Website: dannyleeworks.com

Danny Lee is an Emmy-award-winning American film director, producer, and screenwriter from Los Angeles, California. His work is known for capturing culture and the human condition with a focus on authenticity and emotion. Lee received critical acclaim for his film Who is Stan Smith? (2024).

== Early life ==
The son of Korean immigrants, Lee grew up in the Hancock Park area in Los Angeles. At the age of 10, Lee started making films with his family’s Hi-8 camera. As a teenager, Lee gravitated towards and participated in a variety of subcultures, including skateboarding, graffiti art, and hip-hop. Lee regularly attended the Project Blowed open mic events in Leimert Park, CA and eventually formed his own hip-hop music collective called Six Cents. Lee began his career with Lionsgate Entertainment.

== Career ==
Lee has directed and produced a variety of work including documentaries, scripted films, and commercials. He is most well known for directing the feature documentary Who Is Stan Smith?, which explores the story behind tennis and fashion icon Stan Smith. The film was released theatrically in over 70 markets across the United States, and was executive produced by LeBron James and Maverick Carter's Uninterrupted. Lee is also known for the award-winning 30 for 30 documentary Friedman’s Shoes for ESPN, about the storied shoe store in Atlanta, featuring Shaquille O'Neal. In 2005, Lee released his directorial debut at the AFI Fest with Rock Fresh, a candid documentary about graffiti artists taking their subversive art mainstream. Lee's success with Rock Fresh led him to create CALICO, a production studio based in Los Angeles.

In 2010, Lee created, wrote and directed The Clinic, a Hulu comedy series about a marijuana dispensary. Lee also directed Road To Brooklyn, a documentary series executive produced by Jay-Z, which chronicled the story of the Brooklyn Nets relocating from New Jersey to Brooklyn; the series was a 2013 Webby Awards honoree. Lee was a 2014 Webby Awards Honoree again in 2014 for his film Roll on Rockaway. He directed the documentaries Midnight in Juarez and Skate or Die, the latter of which was inducted into the Smithsonian Institution.

Lee also directed the Nissan-branded ESPN series With Dad featuring Clay Matthews Jr., which won the 2015 Cynopsis Best Branded Web Series award. His television series After The Raves documents the history of dance music with Tommie Sunshine, and is available for streaming on Red Bull TV. In 2018, Lee directed and produced Public Disturbance for Lionsgate. The feature comedy stars Mike Tyson, Skyler Samuels, Amber Stevens West, Bobby Lee, and Dillon Francis.

In 2020, Lee partnered with Nike to direct and produce The Story of Air Max: 90 to 2090, a 24-minute documentary celebrating the history of the iconic sneaker. Later that year, Lee continued his collaboration with Nike on The Story of Dunk, a six-part series tracing the story of the iconic Nike Dunk. That same year, Lee directed and produced a pair of documentaries for Hulu, including one on transgender actress/model/activist Dominique Jackson, and another on former NBA center Jason Collins, who made history in 2013 by becoming the first active openly gay player in any of the "Big Four" sports leagues in the United States.

In 2024, Lee partnered with actor Dulé Hill (The West Wing) and PBS to direct and produce The Express Way with Dulé Hill, a docuseries which follows Hill as he explores the transformative power of the arts. Each episode offers a glimpse into the lives of American artists using their craft to catalyze change. The "Appalachia" episode, for example, introduces Amythyst Kiah, whose song “Black Myself” was nominated for a Grammy for Best American Roots Song in 2020. as well as Doug Naselroad, a luthier based in Hindman, Kentucky who teaches individuals on the road to recovery from opioid addiction how to make stringed instruments using authentic Appalachian hardwood.

Lee was featured in Paper Magazine's 20th Anniversary Beautiful People issue in March 2007. In 2008, the Filmmakers Lab within the Korean Film Council named Lee the recipient of the Best Project Award, along with a cash grant for his feature film script, Winter War.

== Filmography ==
Year	Title	Director	Notes
2005	Rock Fresh	Yes	
2010	The Clinic	Yes	
2012	Road To Brooklyn	Yes	
2012	Skate or Die	Yes	
2013	Detroit Rubber	Yes	
2013	Road Trippp	Yes	
2013	Roll on Rockaway	Yes	
2014	Midnight In Juarez	Yes	
2015	With Dad	Yes	
2015	After The Raves	Yes	
2016	30 For 30 Shorts: Friedman's Shoes	Yes	
2018	Public Disturbance	Yes	
2020	Defining Moments	Yes	
2020	The Story of Air Max: 90 to 2090	Yes	
2020	The Story of Dunk	Yes	
2024	Who Is Stan Smith?	Yes	
2024	The Express Way with Dulé Hill	Yes	
