= Lee Suk-chae =

South Korean businessman (born 1945)

Suk-Chae Lee 이석채
- Born: September 11, 1945 (age 80)

Suk-Chae Lee (Korean: 이석채, born September 11, 1945, Seongju County, North Gyeongsang Province) is a South Korean businessman. Lee was the Chairman and CEO of KT Corporation from January 14, 2009 until November 12, 2013. He was South Korea's Minister of Information and Communication from 1995 to 1996.

== Life and career ==
Lee graduated in 1964 from Seoul National University with a bachelor's degree in economics. In 1979, he received a master's degree in political economics from Boston University. In 1981, he received his doctorate in economics from Boston University.

Before becoming president of KT, his employment history including the following posts:

- 2006 to 2008: Visiting Professor, College of Engineering, Seoul National University
- 2003 to 2008: Senior Advisor, Bae, Kim & Lee LLC
- 2008 to 2008: Member of the Presidential Economic Advisory Board
- 2008: Advisory Board, BT
- 2007 to 2008: Outside Director, LG Electronics
- 2005 to 2008: Outside Director, SK C&C
- 2004 to 2008: Non-executive Director, Kolon Chemical, Co. LTD.
- 1996 to 1997: Chief Economic Advisor to the President, Government of South Korea
- 1995 to 1996: Minister of Information and Telecommunication
- 1994 to 1995: Vice Minister of Finance and Economy and Chairman of Vice Ministerial Economic Committee
- 1992 to 1994: Deputy Minister in charge of National Budget, Economic Planning Board, and Chairman of National Budget Deliberation Committee
- 1984 to 1988: Economic Secretary to the President in Charge of Policy Coordination for Macro, External, Fair Trade, and Agricultural Policies
- 1977 to 1984: Director of various Divisions of the Economic Planning Board

== Awards ==
- 2010: International Institute of Electrical and Electronics Engineers (IEEE) Communications Society Distinguished Industry Leader Award
- 2012: 11th CNBC Asia Business Leaders Awards for talent management
