= Derek Lee (biologist) =

American quantitative ecologist

Derek E. Lee
- Education: Dartmouth College
- Known for: Quantitative ecology, fire ecology, conservation biology
- Awards: Fulbright scholar grant
- Website: www.wildnatureinstitute.org

Derek Lee (also known as Derek E. Lee or Derek Edward Lee) is an American ecologist and wildlife biologist specializing in population biology, conservation biology, and quantitative ecology. Lee is the principal scientist and CEO of the Wild Nature Institute, with ongoing long-term research regarding conservation demography and genetics of Masai giraffes in the Tarangire and Serengeti ecosystems of Tanzania.

== Career ==
Lee received his bachelor's degree in cultural anthropology (anthropology) from University of California at Santa Barbara in 1994, master's degree in natural resource and wildlife management from Humboldt State University in 2001, and his Ph.D. of ecology and evolutionary biology in 2015 from Dartmouth College.

His master's work was focused on migratory behavior of black brant geese in Humboldt Bay, using capture-recapture statistics to estimate stopover duration and space use. Lee's Ph.D. thesis-work studied the spatial demography of giraffes in the Tarangire ecosystem of Tanzania. His discovery of a white leucistic giraffe was widely reported in popular media.

Lee worked at Point Blue Conservation Science from 2002 to 2010 on Southeast Farallon Island, studying how ocean climate change affects the population dynamics of marine predators such as elephant seals, Cassin's auklets, and common murres. In 2010, he founded Wild Nature Institute, a research organization which he currently operates as CEO as well as principal scientist. From 2018 to 2024 he also worked at Pennsylvania State University as an associate research professor.

== Publications ==
Lee has authored or co-authored over 50 scientific peer-reviewed papers since 2002 in the field of ecology, with focus on the demography and population biology of wild vertebrates. His academic work on climate influences on marine bird demography, spotted owls and forest fire, and computer vision applications to wildlife biology being cited in many other publications. Lee's research on the management of ungulate populations in Tanzania was the recipient of a Fulbright fellow grant in 2012 and 2013.
