= Frank Lee (rugby league) =

England international rugby league footballer

Personal information
- Full name: Frank Lee
- Born: 4 October 1880 St. Helens, Lancashire, England
- Died: 1949 (aged 68–69)

Playing information
- Position: Fullback, Forward
Club
Years	Team	Pld	T	G	FG	P
1900–11	St. Helens	202	15	25	0	95
1911–≥11	York
	Total	202	15	25	0	95
Representative
Years	Team	Pld	T	G	FG	P
1905–06	Lancashire	3	0	0	0	0
1906	England	1	0	0	0	0

Frank Lee (4 October 1880 – 1949) was an English professional rugby league footballer who played in the 1900s and 1910s. He played at representative level for England and Lancashire, and at club level for St. Helens and York, as a fullback or forward.

== International honours ==
Lee won a cap for England while at St. Helens in 1906 against Other Nationalities.
