= Lee Township, Minnesota =

Lee Township is the name of some places in the U.S. state of Minnesota:

- Lee Township, Aitkin County, Minnesota
- Lee Township, Beltrami County, Minnesota
- Lee Township, Norman County, Minnesota

== See also ==
- Lee Township (disambiguation)
