= Arthur Lee (cricketer, born 1849) =

English cricketer, clergyman

Personal information
- Full name: Arthur George Lee
- Born: 31 August 1849; Chelsea, Middlesex, England
- Died: 11 July 1925 (aged 75); Paddington, London, England
- Batting: Right-handed
- Role: Wicket-keeper

Domestic team information
- Years: Team
- 1868–1871: Oxford University

Career statistics
Competition	First-class
Matches	4
Runs scored	22
Batting average	4.40
100s/50s	–/–
Top score	16*
Catches/stumpings	6/–
- Source: Cricinfo, 21 March 2020

Arthur George Lee (31 August 1849, Chelsea – 11 July 1925, Paddington) was an English first-class cricketer and clergyman.

The son of John Benjamin Lee, he was born in August 1849 at Chelsea. He was educated at Westminster School, where he was coached in cricket by Thomas Hearne. From Westminster he went up to University College, Oxford, where he matriculated in 1868. He graduated B.A. in 1872, and M.A. in 1877. While studying at Oxford, he played first-class cricket for Oxford University Cricket Club on four occasions between 1868 and 1871, scoring 22 runs with a high score of 16 not out. After graduating from Oxford, Lee took holy orders in the Church of England. His first ecclesiastical post was as vicar of Chippenham in Cambridgeshire from 1878 to 1886, after which he served as the rector of Langham, Suffolk. He died at Paddington in July 1925.
