= Visibly =

American telehealth company

- Company type: Private
- Industry: Telemedicine
- Founded: 2012
- Founder: Steven Lee (optometrist); Aaron Dallek
- Headquarters: Chicago, IL
- Area served: North America
- Key people: Brent Rasmussen (CEO)
- Services: Online Refraction
- Website: govisibly.com

Visibly, formerly known as Opternative, is a telehealth company based in Chicago that offers online vision testing services and perscription renewals for eyeglasses and contact lenses.

Founded in 2012, Visibly provides a mobile-based digital eye exam platform where users can complete vision tests remotely, with results reviewed by a licensed optometrist and delivered via email.

The company does not sell eyewear but charges a fee for its testing services. In 2022, Visibly became the first online vision test to receive FDA 510(k) clearance in the United States.

== History ==
The company as founded as Opternative in 2012 and its online vision test was launched in 2015. In November 2018, the company raised $9 million and changed its name from Opternative to Visibly the following month.

Visibly provides on-line vision tests and generates eyeglasses and contact lens prescriptions for site visitors, delivering these results via email within one day of the completion of the exam. The results of the exam are reviewed by an optometrist, are considered valid prescriptions, and may be used for ordering glasses or contacts over the Internet or in person at an eyeglass retailer. The company itself does not sell any visual aids, and derives its income from the fees it charges for the exams.

As of 2019, 39 US states allow optometrists to issue prescriptions over the Internet. Some states, however, have attempted to ban the company from doing business. In 2016, for example, the state of Indiana passed a law prohibiting the use of on-line eye exams for the issuance of eyeglasses prescriptions for the production of any "ophthalmic device". Visibly filed suit against the state in April 2019, claiming that the incorporation of ophthalmic devices in the telehealth ban— which also included abortion drugs and opioids — which Visibly claimed was influenced by lobbying efforts from optometry groups and industry stakeholders, rather than public health concerns, and was being used unfairly, listing the Medical Licensing Board of Indiana, Indiana Attorney General Curtis Hill and the state Director of the Consumer Protection Division, Betsy Dinardi, as defendants.

In May 2019, Visibly voluntarily recalled its online vision test after discussions with the U.S. Food & Drug Association (FDA), which cited concerns raised by the American Optometric Association (AOA).

In April 2020, in response to the Coronavirus outbreak, the FDA issued guidance to expand the capability of remote ophthalmic assessment, and to facilitate patient care during the pandemic. Visibly announced it will globally provide optometrists, ophthalmologists, and optical service providers free access to its virtual vision test technology, to help patients meet their eye health needs during the pandemic.

In August 2022, Visibly became the first FDA-cleared online vision test after receiving the FDA 510(k) clearance for its mobile-based vision test preferably to provide prescription renewals to people between 22 and 40.

In January 2024, Visibly merged with EyecareLive and launched real-time video consultations.
