= Frederick Lee (cricketer, born 1856) =

English cricketer

Frederick Lee (18 November 1856 – 13 September 1896) was an English first-class cricketer. Born in Baildon, Yorkshire, England, Lee was a right-handed batsman and occasional wicket-keeper, who played 105 games for Yorkshire County Cricket Club between 1882 and 1890, and also played in first-class games for an England XI (1885), The Players (1886–1889), North of England (1887–1889), Lord Hawke's XI (1889) and L Hall's XI (1889).

He scored three centuries, his best innings being a score of 165 in the Roses match against Lancashire. He made 3,953 runs in all, at an average of 21.36 with 19 fifties. He took fifty nine catches and completed one stumping.

He was a free, stylish, enterprising batsman when at his best and learnt the game at Baildon Green C.C., heading that club's batting averages from 1879 to 1881. From 1882 to 1884, he was engaged by Hodgson & Simpson's in Wakefield. He always lived in Baildon, and was only 33 years old when he was replaced by Yorkshire, possibly due to Lord Hawke's insistence on a better disciplinary record from his team. Lee was also engaged by Bradford C.C., Saltaire C.C., Bowling Old Lane C.C., Warrington C.C. and Bingley C.C.

He died in Baildon in September 1896, at the age of 39. His funeral was held at Baildon Church.
