= Georgia Lee =

Georgia Lee may refer to:

- Georgia Lee (director) (born 1976), American film director
- Georgia Lee (singer) (1921–2010), Australian Aboriginal jazz vocalist
- "Georgia Lee", a song on the 1999 Tom Waits album Mule Variations
