= Eugene Lee (entrepreneur) =

American businessman

Eugene Lee is an American businessman based in Palo Alto, California.

== Early life ==
Lee received an A.B. in Physics, an Sc. B. in Engineering and Applied Sciences from Harvard University, and an M.S. in management from the MIT Sloan School of Management.

== Career ==
Lee's career spans startups as well as large established companies, but his focus has always been on "the intersection of people, software, and networks". He was the co-founder of Beyond Incorporated, whose BeyondMail product pioneered email filtering and workflow. Lee was the VP and GM of the Messaging Business Unit at Banyan, which acquired Beyond, and then was the VP Marketing and Business Development for Banyan's Internet Division, where he launched Switchboard.com, an online white and yellow pages directory. He moved to California when he was recruited by Cisco Systems as the VP Worldwide Small/Medium Business Marketing, and then held assignments as the VP Marketing for Cisco's Internet Communications Software Group, and eventually VP Worldwide Enterprise Marketing. From 2004 to 2007, Lee was at Adobe Systems as the VP Product Marketing for the Intelligent Documents Business Unit and then as the VP Vertical and Solutions Marketing. Lee was named "CEO 2.0" to Socialtext in November 2007.

He went on to found Motiv8 Technologies, dedicated to helping people with behavioral changes. Its California business registration was suspended in 2019, and returned to "active" status in 2020.

He is the holder of 4 patents.
