= M. Howard Lee =

M. Howard Lee (21 May 1937 – 18 November 2016) was a Korean-born American physicist who was Regents' Professor at University of Georgia.

== Life and career ==
Born in Busan, South Korea he gained a BS in chemistry in 1959 and a Ph.D. in physics and astronomy in 1967 from the University of Pennsylvania. He was then a postdoc at the Theoretical Physics Institute at the University of Alberta in Edmonton from 1967 to 1969, after which he was a member of the Center for Materials Science at MIT from 1969 to 1973. He was appointed assistant professor at the University of Georgia in 1973, becoming a full professor in 1985 and a Regents Professor in 1999.

He was elected a Fellow of the American Physical Society in 2001, and his citation read

Developed the method of recurrence relations to study dynamic behavior in many particle systems. Established an equivalence between Fermi and Bose gases in two dimensions.
