= Martin Lee (disambiguation) =

Martin Lee (born 1938) is a Hong Kong politician.

Martin Lee may also refer to:

- Martin Lee (New York politician), 19th-century New York politician
- Martin Lee (singer) (1946–2024), British singer and composer for Brotherhood of Man
- Martin Lee (tennis) (born 1978), British tennis player
- Martin A. Lee, American author and leftist
- Martin Lee Ka-shing (born 1971), vice-chairman of Henderson Land Development and the son of Hong Kong billionaire Lee Shau Kee
- Martin Lee, Australian drummer with Regurgitator
- Martin Lee, member of the Irish Republican Army

== See also ==
- Martyn Lee (disambiguation)
