= Gordon Lee =

Gordon Lee may refer to:

- Gordon Lee (comic store owner) (1958–2013), American comic book store owner charged with distributing obscene materials
- Gordon Lee (Georgia politician) (1859–1927), U.S. congressman from Georgia
- Gordon Lee (footballer) (1934–2022), English football player and manager
- Gordon de Lisle Lee (1863–1927), British heraldry expert
- Gordon William Lee (1894–1964), former Alberta politician

== See also ==
- Lee Gordon (disambiguation)
