= Shane Lee =

Shane Lee may refer to:

- Shane Lee (American football) (born 2000), American football player
- Shane Lee (cricketer) (born 1973), Australian cricketer
- Shane Lee (racing driver) (born 1993), American stock car racing driver
