= Dennis Lee =

Dennis Lee may refer to:

- Dennis Lee (author) (born 1939), Canadian children's writer and poet
- Dennis Lee, director of Fireflies in the Garden and Jesus Henry Christ
- Dennis Lee (singer), vocalist for Alesana

== See also ==
- Dennis Lees CBE (1924–2008), British economist
- Dennis Leigh (disambiguation)
