= Helen Lee =

Helen Lee may refer to:

- Helen Lee (fashion designer) (1909–1991), American children's clothes designer
- Yeh Hsieh-chin (1911–2015), Chinese politician also known as Helen Lee
- Helen Shores Lee (1941–2018), American jurist and lawyer
- Helen Lee (cricketer) (born 1943), Australian cricketer
- Helen Lee (director) (born c. 1965), Korean-Canadian film director
- Helen Lee (researcher), medical researcher and inventor
- Helen Lee (artist) (born 1978), American artist and glassblower
