= Fred C. Lee =

American electronics engineer

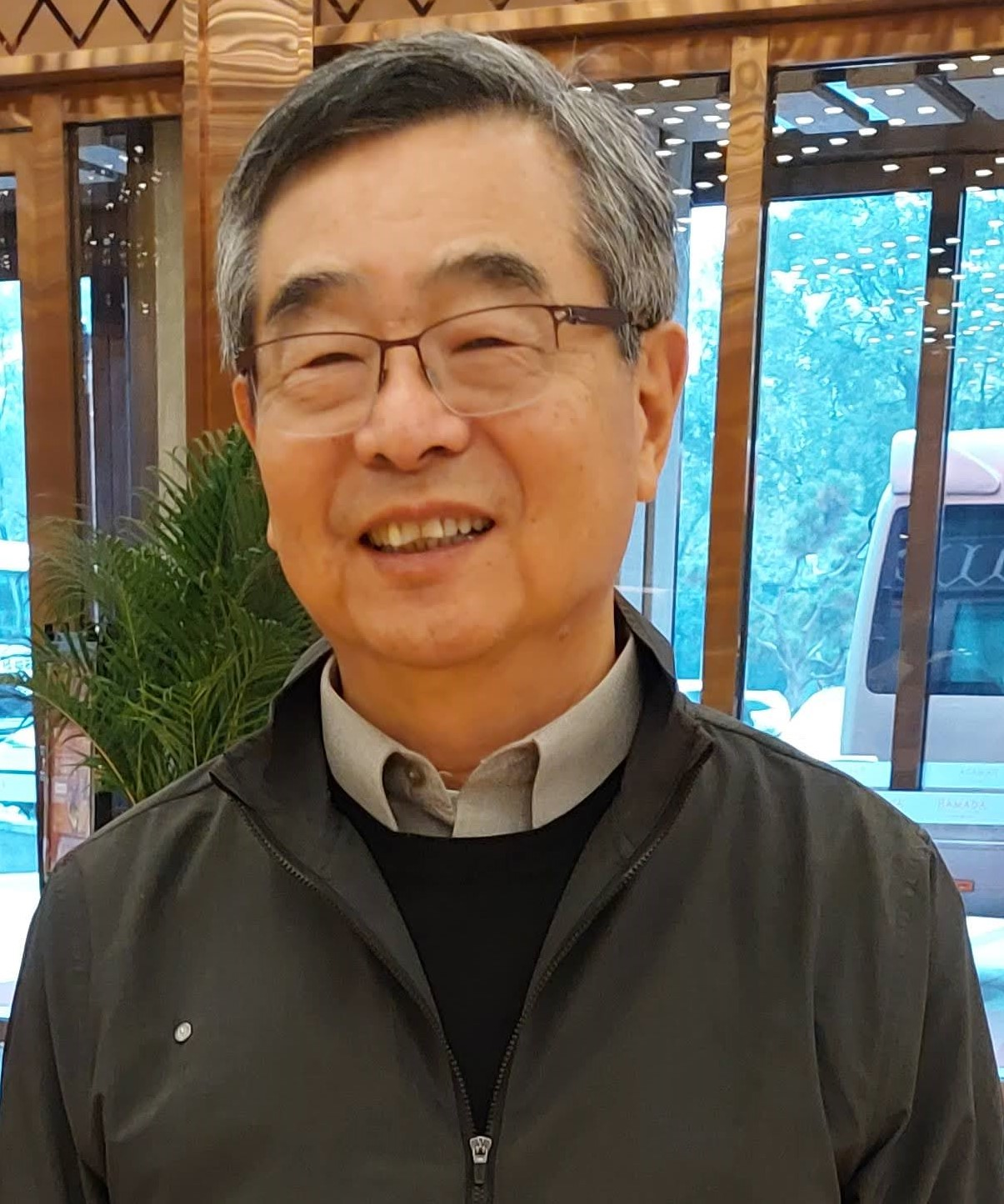
- Education: Duke University
- Known for: Power Electronics (High Frequency Power Conversion)
- Awards: IEEE Medal in Power Engineering (2015), Member of National Academy of Engineering (2011), IEEE Millennium Medal (2000), IEEE Fellow (1990), IEEE William E. Newell Power Electronics Award (1989)

Fred C. Lee is a University Distinguished Professor Emeritus and the founder of the Center for Power Electronics Systems (CPES), at Virginia Tech, Blacksburg, Virginia, U.S. His research has focused on high-frequency power conversion, soft-switching technologies, magnetics and EMI, and system integration in power electronics.

== Education background ==
Lee received his B.S. degree in Electrical Engineering from National Cheng Kung University, Tainan, Taiwan, in 1968. He later obtained his M.S. and Ph.D. degrees in Electrical Engineering from Duke University, North Carolina, USA, in 1972 and 1974.

== Research contributions ==
=== Building Center for Power Electronics Systems (CPES) ===
After completing his Ph.D., Lee joined the faculty at Virginia Tech, where he established a power electronics program in 1977. In 1983, it became the Virginia Power Electronics Center (VPEC), and subsequently it was known as the Center for Power Electronics Systems (CPES) in 1998. CPES was also recognized as a US National Science Foundation Engineering Research Center - a collaboration of five universities, namely, Virginia Tech, University of Wisconsin-Madison, Rensselaer Polytechnic Institute, North Carolina A&T State University, and University of Puerto Rica-Mayaguez, and over 80 industry partners. Lee served as the Director of the NSF Engineering Research Centers (ERC).

=== High-Frequency Power Conversion ===
Lee has been a contributor to high-frequency power conversion, focusing on efficient and compact power conversion systems and integrated solution with modular building blocks. He was instrumental in the development of a 400 kW ultra-high-speed electric vehicle charging device and Solid State Transformer (SST) carrying the third-generation semiconductor SiC MOSFET by Delta Electronics in Detroit, USA, in 2022. Lee's work with Navitas Semiconductor also focused on high-frequency power conversion technologies that had led to a new class of ultra-high-density converters using GaN technology.

=== Magnetics for Power Electronics ===
Lee's research focused on integrating magnetic components into power electronics modules to enhance performance and reduce size. This includes the development of integrated power electronics modules (IPEMs) that incorporate magnetic components for improved efficiency and reliability. The magnetic integrations have also extended to matrix transformers and three-phase interleaved resonant converters.

=== Multi-Phase Voltage Regulator Module ===
Lee was also involved in the development of multi-phase voltage regulator module (VRM). The VRM has been powering every microprocessor manufactured since 1998, helping improve the performance, reliability, and cost-efficiency of electric energy processing systems using an integrated system approach.

=== Patents, publications and research supervisions ===
Lee holds 105 U.S patents, and has published more than 1000 research papers with IEEE with a cumulative citation of more than 46,000 in IEEE. He also has an H-index of more than 150 and citations of more than 89,000 on Google Scholar. During his tenure at Virginia Tech, he has supervised 88 Ph.D. and 94 Master's students.

== Notable awards and distinctions ==
In 1989, Lee was honored with the IEEE William E. Newell Power Electronics Award, with the scope of the award mentioning "For outstanding contributions to power electronics". He was elevated to IEEE Fellow in 1990 with the citation mentioning "For contribution to high-frequency quasi-resonant and multiresonant converters and for the development of a program of engineering education in power electronics."

From 1993 to 1994, Lee became the IEEE Power Electronics Society (PELS) President and led initiatives to advance the power electronics community. He was a recipient of the IEEE Millennium Medal in 2000, which recognized individuals for "outstanding contributions in their respective areas of activity." In 2011, he was elected into the National Academy of Engineering with the election citation "For contributions to high-frequency power conversion and systems integration technologies, education, industry alliances, and technology transfer."

In 2015, Lee was the recipient of the IEEE Medal in Power Engineering, with the citation mentioning "For contributions to power electronics, especially high-frequency power conversion." He was elected as a Fellow to the National Academy of Inventors in 2017, which recognizes the contributions of academic inventors that have made a tangible impact on quality of life, economic development, and the welfare of society.
