= Simon Lee (artist) =

British artist

- Born: Yorkshire, United Kingdom
- Citizenship: British
- Education: Gloucestershire College of Art and Design (BA Hons, First Class)
- Known for: Bus Obscura, media art, participatory performance
- Notable work: Bus Obscura, whiteonwhite:algorithmicnoir, Are the Birds Happy?
- Awards: Hewlett 50 Arts Commission (2022); New York Foundation for the Arts Fellowship (1999, 2005, 2015); Pollock-Krasner Foundation Grant (1990)

Simon Lee is a British-American media artist. He works in photography, video art, installation art and participatory performance. Born in the United Kingdom, he is based in Brooklyn. He is known for his public art project Bus Obscura, a passenger bus converted into a mobile camera obscura. Lee's practice includes extensive collaborations, particularly with artist Eve Sussman, with whom he co-founded the Wallabout Oyster Theater in Brooklyn.

Lee's collaborative projects include the algorithmic film whiteonwhite:algorithmicnoir, created with Sussman and Rufus Corporation; the dual-screen installation Car Wash Incident; and the participatory performance Are the Birds Happy?, created with Sussman and composer Volkmar Klien.

His work has been exhibited at institutions including the Whitney Museum of American Art, the Brooklyn Museum and the Musée d'art contemporain de Montréal. The New York Times critic Holland Cotter described his work as "a powerful metaphor for the random flow of history and a low tech formal tour de force".

== Early life and education ==
Lee was born in Yorkshire, United Kingdom. He received a BA (Hons) with first-class distinction in Fine Art from Gloucestershire College of Art and Design. As of 2025, he lives and works in Brooklyn, New York.

== Career ==
Lee's practice employs photography, video art and installation art, expanding to include live multi-screen theatrical events and large-scale participatory performance. His work combines analog or pre-photographic technologies with contemporary media formats, frequently employing non-linear, fragmented, and looping narratives.

Bus Obscura (2004–2008) is a public art project in which a passenger bus was converted into a mobile, multiple-aperture camera obscura, creating a 360-degree, real-time panoramic projection for passengers. The project was featured at the Armory Show 2005, Art Basel Miami Beach, and Museum Tinguely in Basel, Switzerland. A related variation, Tram Obscura, was exhibited in Warsaw, Poland.

Where is the Black Beast? (2009–2010) is a 35-minute film created with composer Algis Kizys that interprets Ted Hughes's poem cycle Crow: From the Life and Songs of the Crow through hundreds of found amateur snapshots assembled into a cinematic narrative. The film was an official selection at the 2011 International Film Festival Rotterdam and screened at the IFC Center in New York and LOOP Video Festival in Barcelona.

Lee's installation Mother Is Passing. Come At Once (2013) at Cristin Tierney Gallery featured floor-to-ceiling screens moving on motorized tracks, catching projected shadows as they passed by eight projectors. The work incorporated found photographs collected from junk shops from Poland to Algeria, which Lee storyboarded, re-photographed, and cropped to explore how people are drawn to commemorate similar subjects. The installation also included collaged letters and correspondences of strangers, with invited writers responding to these forgotten discourses.

Lee frequently collaborates with the artist Eve Sussman. The two are longtime, high-profile participants at the Spring/Break Art Show in New York. Their collaborative works explore themes of voyeurism, architectural space, and the material qualities of film and photography. The exhibition A Side Window (2013) at Locks Gallery in Philadelphia featured several collaborative video works created while Sussman and Rufus Corporation produced whiteonwhite:algorithmicnoir in Central Asia. Wintergarden (2011) is a three-channel video installation depicting Soviet-era apartment balconies in Bishkek, Kyrgyzstan, slowly transforming into one another.

Car Wash Incident (2012–2020), created with Sussman, is a dual-screen installation employing 1970s film noir aesthetics with two simultaneous takes of the same scene operating as an endless loop. The project was produced under the personae of "Jack and Leigh Ruby". No food No money No jewels (2015–2016) is a multi-screen video installation exploring themes of suburbia, existentialist dread, and capitalist objectification, exhibited at Locks Gallery in Philadelphia and Aksioma Gallery in Ljubljana, Slovenia.

radioOradio (2021–2022), created by Lee, Sussman, and Algis Kizys, is a live multi-screen theatrical event merging traditional radio play with improvisational VJ editing. Are the Birds Happy? (2022–2024), created with Sussman and composer Volkmar Klien, is a participatory performance exploring themes of control, agency, and community in networked society, operating on a web-based application that guides audience-performers individually via headphones on their smartphones. The project was a co-production by Gray Area in San Francisco and The Long Now Foundation, created with funding from a Hewlett 50 Arts Commission.

== Exhibitions and collections ==
Lee has exhibited work at the Whitney Museum of American Art, Brooklyn Museum, Musée d'art contemporain de Montréal, Museum Tinguely, SculptureCenter, Smack Mellon Studios, Pierogi 2000, and Roebling Hall. He has participated in the Poznan Biennale, Moscow International Film Festival, and International Film Festival Rotterdam.whiteonwhite:algorithmicnoir, created by Eve Sussman, Rufus Corporation, and Simon Lee, is in the permanent collection of the Smithsonian American Art Museum.

== Awards and residencies ==
Lee has received the Hewlett 50 Arts Commission in Media Art (2022, with Eve Sussman and Volkmar Klien), New York Foundation for the Arts (NYFA) Fellowship (1999, 2005, 2015), New York State Council on the Arts (NYSCA) Grant (2008, 2016, 2023), Pollock-Krasner Foundation Grant (1990), Robert D. Bielecki Foundation Grant (2015), and Café Royale Grant (2021). He has held artist residencies at CEC ArtsLink (Saint Petersburg, Russia), EMPAC (Troy, NY), MacDowell Colony, Triangle (Marseille, France), Yaddo, and Sculpture Space Inc.
