= Matthew Lee =

Matthew Lee or variants may refer to:

- Matthew Lee (lawyer), Chinese-American public interest lawyer
- Matthew Lee (sociologist), American sociologist
- Gammer (born 1985), real name Matthew Lee, British DJ and producer
- Matty Lee (born 1998), British diver
- Matt Lee (American football) (born 2001), American football safety
- Matt Lee (dancer), Australian dancer and actor
- Matt Lee (journalist) (born 1965), Associated Press reporter
- Matt Lee (wrestler) (born 1983), Canadian professional wrestler
