= Gary Lee (journalist) =

American journalist

- Education: Phillips Academy; Amherst College
- Occupations: Journalist, Travel writer
- Employer(s): The Washington Post, Time
- Awards: Lowell Thomas,

Gary Lee is an American journalist with a focus on foreign policy, travel writing and environmental issues. He wrote for The Washington Post as well as Time. In 2021, he was named Managing Editor of The Oklahoma Eagle, a weekly newspaper in the Black Wall Street area of Tulsa, Oklahoma, and has led the paper to several awards. He speaks five languages including Russian German, French and Spanish, and he was The Washington Post's Moscow bureau chief. He was twice nominated for the Pulitzer Prize for foreign coverage and won the Lowell Thomas Award for travel journalism for his coverage of 9/11. He was elected to the position of charter trustee at Phillips Academy in 2009. In 2007, he left the Washington Post to become a freelance journalist.

== Education ==
Lee grew up in Tulsa, Oklahoma, the fourth child in a family of eleven. He attended Phillips Academy in Andover, Massachusetts between 1970 and '74. His studies there centered on English literature and modern languages. He began his reporting career at Andover as a writer for The Phillipian, the campus newspaper, and general manager of WPAA, the school's radio station. Lee, in a later interview with travel writer Ross Potts, thought that his parents realized that he had a wanderlust and urge to explore the world. Lee graduated from Andover in 1974, the school's first co-educational class; among his classmates were many future writers, including poets Chris Agee and Karl Kirchwey, writer Nate Lee, publisher and activist Ted Nace, editor Sara Nelson, and political analyst and writer Heather Mac Donald. Lee completed his secondary school education in studies at Uppingham School, a private academy in Rutland County, England. Lee attended Amherst College and graduated cum laude in 1979, with a double major in Russian language and Development Studies with particular interest in Africa. He was editor in chief of the Amherst Student, the campus newspaper, an avid track runner, and dj of a jazz radio program.

== Career ==
In his early career, Lee worked at Time first as a writer focusing on the environment and later as a correspondent in the magazine's bureau in Germany. In 1984, he was hired by The Washington Post and became the paper's bureau chief in Moscow from 1985 to 1989. There he led the coverage of the era of then Soviet leader Mikhail Gorbachev and the collapse of the Soviet Union. In a later interview, he described the experience as both "brutal and exhilarating" since it forced him to "bang out long pieces on deadline almost daily". Lee also covered Congress and served as the Post's national environmental writer. Later, he became a travel writer for the Post specializing in eco tourism, and cultural travel issues. According to Lee's own accounting, he has written about more than 80 countries, stayed in over a thousand hotels, motels, and bed and breakfasts on assignments. He has camped out near the Potomac River as well as taken the Trans-Siberian Railway in Russia. In his reporting, Lee advised travelers on such matters as getting around Moscow, ecologically correct hotels, safety on cruise ships, travel to Canada, dining options, avoiding hurricanes in the Caribbean, tipping customs, private tour guides, and many other travel-related matters. Since 2007, Lee has written articles on sociological travel trends and environmental issues for several national magazines.

Lee was interviewed by travel writer Rolf Potts who assembled a collection of "globe-trotting authors", including Lee in his blog "Rolf Potts' Vagabonding Blog". Lee advises would-be travel writers to learn a foreign language to help one "gain insight into how another culture ticks". In an interview, Lee described his approach to travel writing:

When I arrive at a destination, I like to have a plan for what I want to focus on: music in Salvador Bahia, Brazil, art galleries in Dallas and Fort Worth, dive bars in LA, and so on. But I always grapple with how much I should stick with the plan and how much to riff, be serendipitous and follow the natural path that unwinds through every place.

— Gary Lee, Interview in Rolf Potts' "Vagabonding"

According to The Washington Post, he loves "exotic digestibles" such as "mare's milk in Mongolia". In addition to his writing, Lee is co-founder and co-owner of Las Canteras Restaurant, voted the top Latin restaurant in Washington, D.C. in 2011 and 2012. He is also helped to start and is co-owner and marketing director of Casa Arequipa, a boutique hotel in Arequipa, Peru cited by Tripadvisor as one of the top 25 hotels in South America in 2012.

In 2021, joined the masthead at his hometown weekly, The Oklahoma Eagle. A year later, the paper won five top awards from the Oklahoma Press Association. In 2023, Lee won the Oklahoma Press Foundation's Ray Lokey award, given annually by them to the top writer in the state. In 2023 the Eagle won eleven first-place awards from the Oklahoma Press Association.

== Charity work and volunteering ==
Lee was elected to the position of charter trustee of Phillips Academy in 2009, and helps organize events such as Non-sibi day as well as hosting and speaking at alumni events. He received Andover's Distinguished Service Award in 1998. He's a member of the Ted Scripps Fellowships Advisory Board at the center for Environmental Journalism at the University of Colorado. Lee has served as a board member of the Society of Environmental Journalists. He was a founder and co-chair of the newsroom diversity committee at The Washington Post.
