= Philip John Lee =

Background information
- Born: 6 May 1945; Norwich, England
- Died: 6 March 2010 (aged 64) London, England
- Genres: Flamenco; classical
- Occupations: Guitarist; Composer
- Instrument: Flamenco guitar
- Years active: 1965–2010

Philip John Lee (6 May 1944 – 6 March 2010) was an English virtuoso flamenco guitarist born in Norwich. He taught himself the mandolin while in school and began classical guitar lesson at age 14. A year later, after first hearing flamenco, he committed to becoming a flamenco guitarist and dedicated the next four years to its study. At age 15, he also built his own classical guitar.

== Early career ==
In the early 1960s he went to Spain, initially to Seville, where musicians were still hired unconventionally, paid according to how much they pleased the guests, but they were normally all Spanish. In an interview, he described how the gitano (Romani) musicians let him sit in on such occasions, astonished that he never asked for payment, yet he often did most of the playing. He describes his influences as the more orthodox flamenco guitarists, such as Ramón Montoya and Sabicas. He was the first English guitarist to win such acceptance.

== Career in the UK ==
He gave many recitals in Britain, including the Wigmore Hall and the Purcell Room, as well as performances on radio and television. In 1969 he released an album, "Flamenco Guitar", on the now defunct Music for Pleasure label, recorded with engineer John Boyden in Conway Hall using a pair of AKG microphones and a Revox tape recorded at 15ips. It was a best seller, selling over a quarter of a million copies.

== Later career ==
Over the following years he went on to record several other albums. In 1989 he moved to the United States where he lived and performed in Los Angeles for ten years. In 1999 he published an album entitled The LA Concert and returned to England the same year, settling in West London, where he taught many students. Many other modern guitarists have given renderings of his pieces, and he is now being discovered by younger players. Lee died on 3 March 2010 at the age of 64. After his passing, Classical Guitar magazine published a six-page compilation of tributes to his career, including a long memoir by Paco Peña.

== Discography ==
Album title	Label	Cat#	Year
Flamenco Guitar	Music For Pleasure	MFP 1291	1969
Guitar Kaleidoscope	Chapter 1	GHS 5003	1971
Flamenco Virtuoso	Rediffusion		1972
Five Swords	Run River Records	RR A002	1987
The LA Concert (Live album)			1999
