= Alice Lee =

Alice Lee may refer to:

- Alice Lee (actress) (born 1989), American actress
- Alice Lee (chess player) (born 2009), American chess player
- Alice Lee (civic leader) (1854–1943), civic leader in San Diego
- Alice Lee (mathematician) (1858–1939), British mathematician, one of the first women to graduate from London University
- Lü Bicheng (1883–1943), also known as Alice Lee, Chinese activist, writer, newspaper editor, poet and school founder
- Alice Hathaway Roosevelt (1861–1884), née Lee, American socialite and first wife of president Theodore Roosevelt
- Alice Finch Lee (1911–2014), American lawyer and sister of author Harper Lee
