= Christine Lee (archaeologist) =

Taiwanese American bioarchaeologist

Christine Lee is a Taiwanese American bioarchaeologist and assistant professor of anthropology at the University of Mississippi. Her research focuses on questions of ethnic diversity in Egypt and Central Asia.

== Education and career ==
Lee completed her undergraduate degree at the University of Texas, Austin. She then completed her M.A. and her PhD in anthropology at Arizona State University.

Lee has held academic appointments in China and the US. In China, Lee held appointments at the Centre for Frontier Archaeology at Jilin University and the Institute for Vertebrate Paleontology and Paleoanthropology. In the latter, she worked on remains collected from the Mogou burial grounds in Gansu Province. She has taught at the University of Arkansas, Fayetteville, University of South Florida, and California State University, Los Angeles before joining the University of Mississippi in 2022. Lee is a National Geographic Emerging Explorer and a TED Global Fellow.

== Research ==
Her research into female warriors in Central Asia has been featured by a number of news sites, drawing comparison to the story of Mulan.

== Selected publications ==
- 2020 C. Lee. Nomadic identity: The origins of a multiethnic empire in Mongolia. In S. Becker and S. Juengst, editors. Cooperative bodies: Bioarchaeologists address non-ranked societies. American Anthropologist Vital Topics Forum Cooperative bodies: Bioarchaeology and Non-ranked societies. 122: 920–923. https://doi.org/10.1111/aman.13491
- 2020 C. Lee. Ancestors, conflict, and criminality in Ancient China and Mongolia. In T. K. Betsinger, A. B. Scott, and A. Tsaliki, editors. A bioarchaeological perspective of atypical mortuary practices: A geographic and temporal investigation. Gainesville: University Press of Florida.
- 2019 C. Lee and L. Sun. A bioarchaeological and biocultural investigation of Chinese footbinding at the Xuecun archaeological site, Henan Province, China. In International Journal of Paleopathology special issue: Paleopathology Research in Continental China, E. Berger and K. Pechenkina, editors. 25: 9–19. https://doi.org/10.1016/j.ijpp.2019.03.001
- 2019 C. Lee. Conservation recommendations for human skeletal remains excavated from desert oases, cave shelters, and permafrost, in China and Mongolia. In Advances in Archaeological Practices special issue: Curating the Past: The Practice and Ethics of Skeletal Conservation Katherine Miller and Carolyn Freiwald, editors. 7 (1): 68–76. https://doi.org/10.1017/aap.2018.39
