= Sharon Lee (singer) =

Hong Kong singer (born 1988)

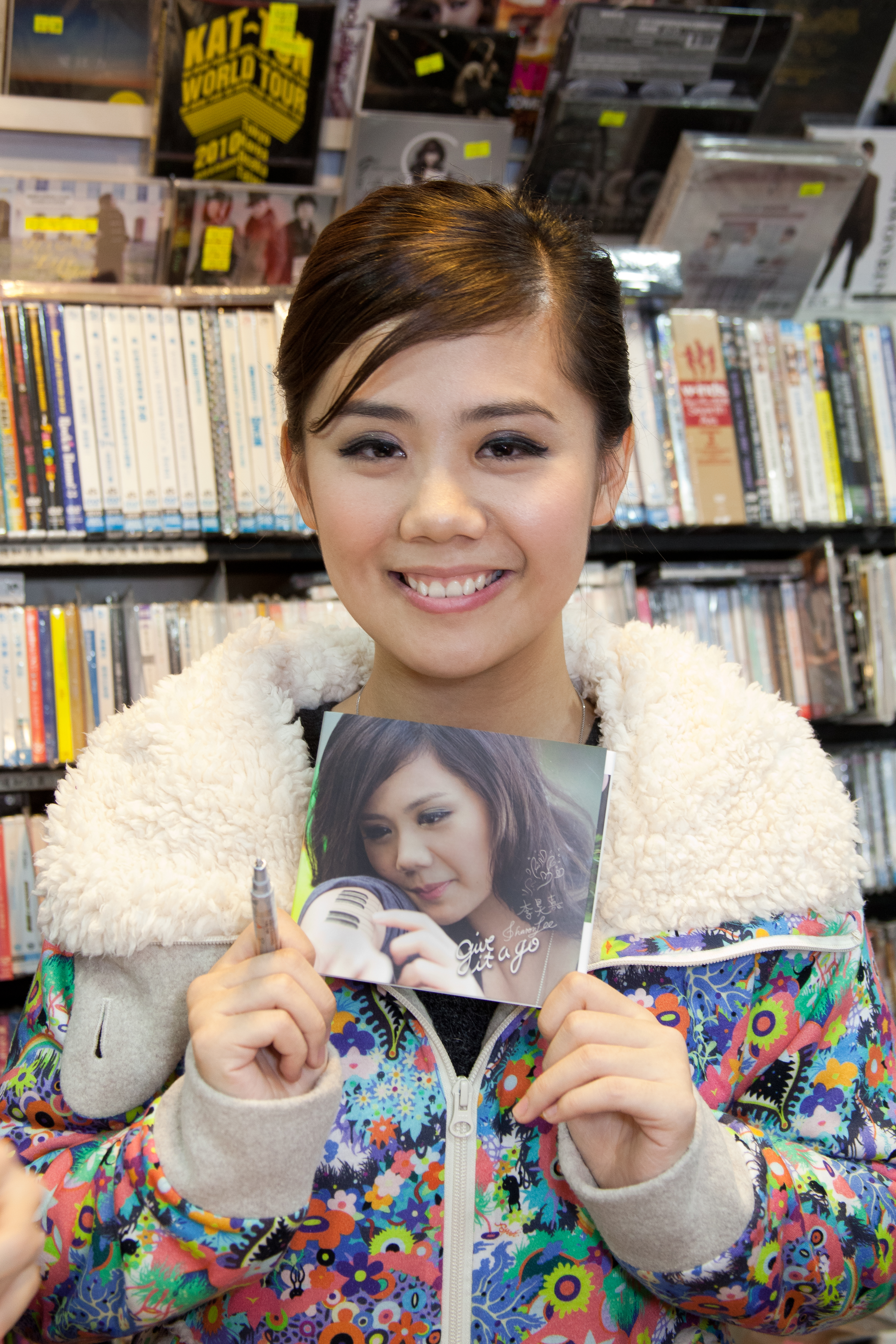
- Born: 21 April 1988 (age 38); British Hong Kong
- Occupations: Student, singer
- Years active: 2009–present

Chinese name
- Traditional Chinese: 李昊嘉
- Simplified Chinese: 李昊嘉
Transcriptions
- Musical career
- Genre: Cantopop
- Website: http://www.kavoice.com Sharon Lee Official Website http://sharonkakaifc.com Sharon Lee International Fan Club

Sharon Lee 李昊嘉 (born 21 April 1988 in Hong Kong) is a Hong Kong singer.

== Biography ==
Sharon Lee was a contestant in the first season of Asian Millionstar, and first gained publicity after performing a cover of 電燈膽 by Stephy Tang. The video of her cover received almost 100,000 hits on YouTube overnight. While she was still competing in Asian Millionstar, she debuted with her first song 萬歲師表 in 2009. She had also auditioned for The Voice on Television Broadcasts Limited (TVB), but did not make it to the 100 finalists.

Sharon Lee graduated from HKIED with a Bachelor of Music in Education(Hons) and a Master of Music in Education in 2011 and 2012 respectively. Lee has achieved LTCL Piano Recital and ABRSM Theory of Music Grade 8 and is now a singing and piano instructor.

On December 1, 2010, Lee's debut single album EP-Give it a Go (EP) was released.

== Music career ==
=== Pre-Asian Millionstar ===
| Year | Name of Competition | Result | Remarks |
|---|---|---|---|
| 2006 | 劉詩昆全港青少年鋼琴 | Fourth Prize | — |
| 2006 | 聯校歌唱比賽 | First Place | The Chinese University of Hong Kong – Tung Wah Group of Hospitals Community College and School of Continuing and Professional Studies |
| 2006 | 香港中文大學–東華三院社區書院第一屆歌唱比賽冠軍 | First Place | — |
| 2007 | 副學位學生歌唱比賽 | Second Place | The Federation for Continuing Education in Tertiary Institutions |
| 2007 | 葵青國慶盃歌唱比賽 | First Place | — |
| 2008 | 劉詩昆全港青少年鋼琴 | First Prize | — |
| 2009 | 香港教育學院歌唱比賽 | First Place | — |
| 2009 | Hong Kong Representative of Seoul Fringe A Cappella Festival (Korea) – 全亞洲青少年無伴奏歌唱比賽 | Champion and Best Vocal | — |

=== Asian Millionstar (Season 1) ===
| Original Air Date | Song | Original Artist | Score | Remarks |
|---|---|---|---|---|
| 2009/07/19 | Vincent | Don McLean | 61 | 3rd Place |
| 2009/08/02 | 非你莫屬 | Ariel Lin | 59 | Duet with Rachel Ho; 5th Place |
| 2009/08/09 | 夢一場 | Natasha Na | 52 | 9th Place |
| 2009/08/16 | 花無雪 | Vincy Chan | 63 | 4th Place |
| 2009/08/23 | 世上只有 | Joey Yung | 62 | 4th Place |
| 2009/08/30 | 感應 | Vincy Chan | 66 | 5th Place |
| 2009/09/13 | Promise Me | Beverley Craven | 70 | Duet with Wen Fang Wu (Lose); 4th Place |
| 2009/09/20 | Vincent | Don McLean | 43 | Duet with Hawawa Yang (Lose); 2nd Place |
| 2009/10/04 | 電燈膽 | Stephy Tang | 67.4 | 2nd Place |
| 2009/10/11 | 願 | Sandy Lam | 65.4 | 2nd Place |
| 2009/10/25 | Goodbye | Air Supply | 62.8 | Duel with Kelon Wu (Win); 4th Place |
| 2009/11/08 | 假如讓我說下去 | Miriam Yeung | 65 | 3rd Place |
| 2009/11/29 | 絕 | Maggie Fu | 74.5 | Duel with Willi Li (Lose); 3rd Place |
| 2009/11/29 | 感應 | Vincy Chan | 7.8 | Tie with Raymond Seen |
| 2009/11/29 | Promise Me | Beverley Craven | 8 | Tie with Raymond Seen again, enters the finals as one of the 7 finalists |
| 2009/12/06 (Finals) | Part 1 : 未知 | Joey Yung | 72 | — |
| 2009/12/06 (Finals) | Part 2 : 明天我要嫁給你 | Emil Chau | 145 | 7th Place overall |
Post-Competition
| 2009/12/13 (Tribute to the Judges) | 離別的叮嚀 | Donald Cheung | — | Tribute to Donald Cheung, duet with Raymond Seen |
| 2009/12/13 (Tribute to the Judges) | 謝謝你 | Adason Lo | — | Tribute to Bowie Tsang, chorus with all contestants |
| 2009/12/20 (Tribute to the Fans) | 我只在乎你 | Teresa Teng | — | — |
| 2009/12/27 (2009 Review) | — | — | — | Performance of 電燈膽 earns 8th Place of events worth reviewing |

=== Gallery ===
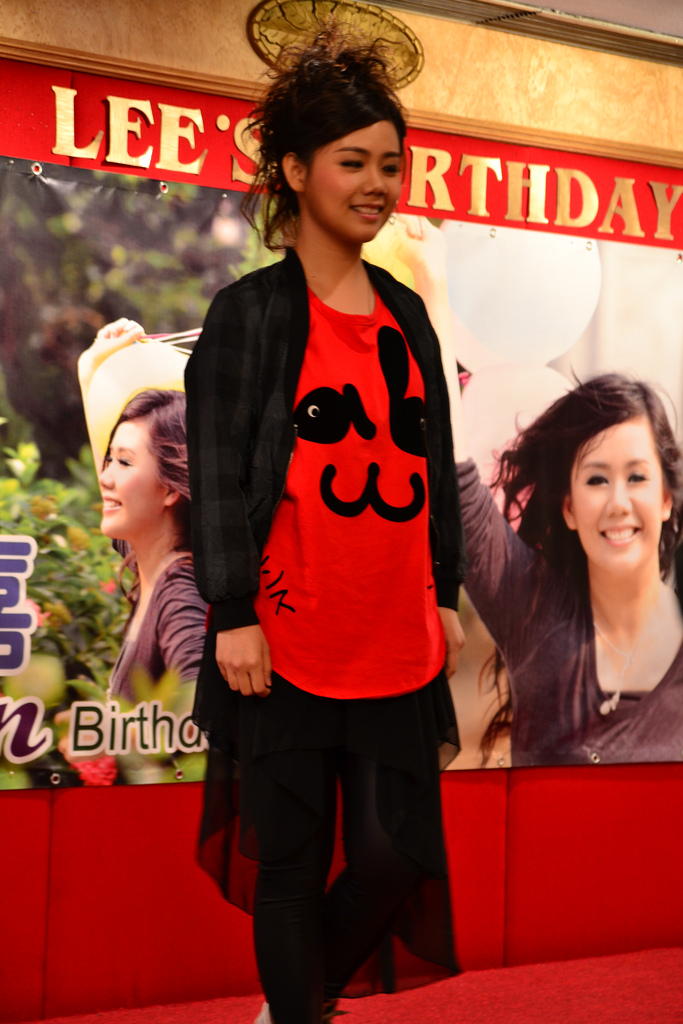

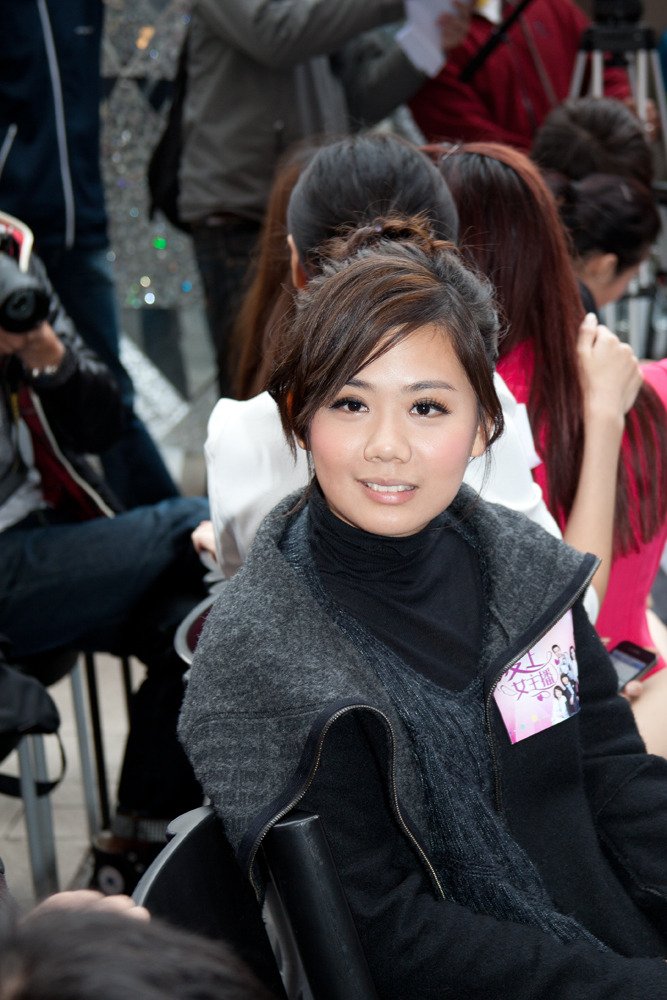

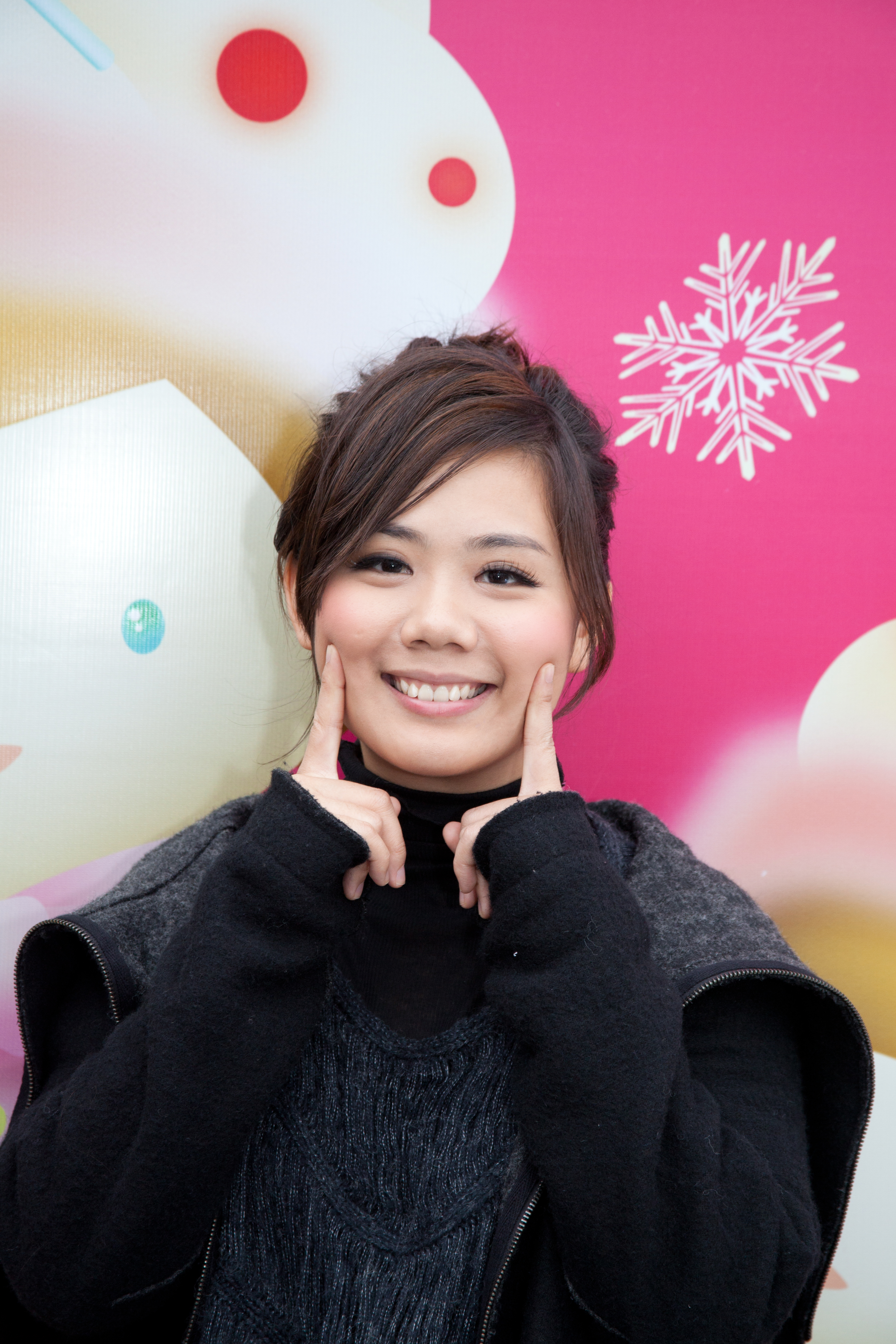

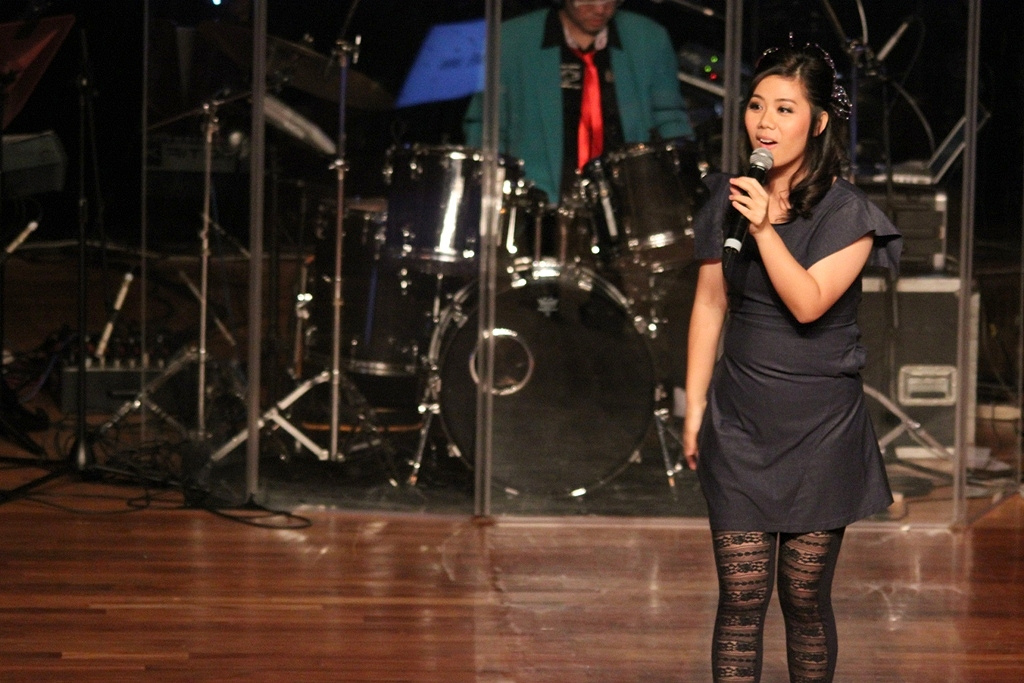

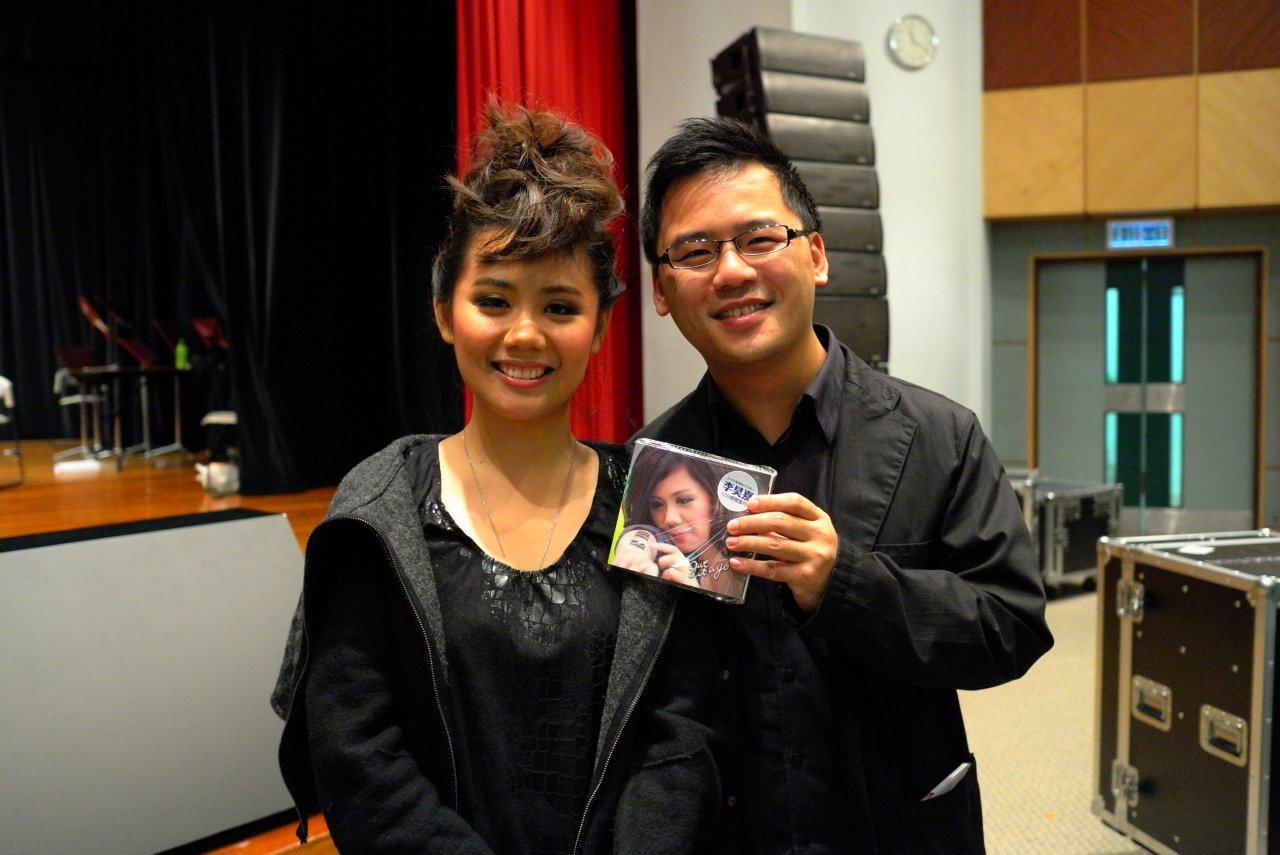

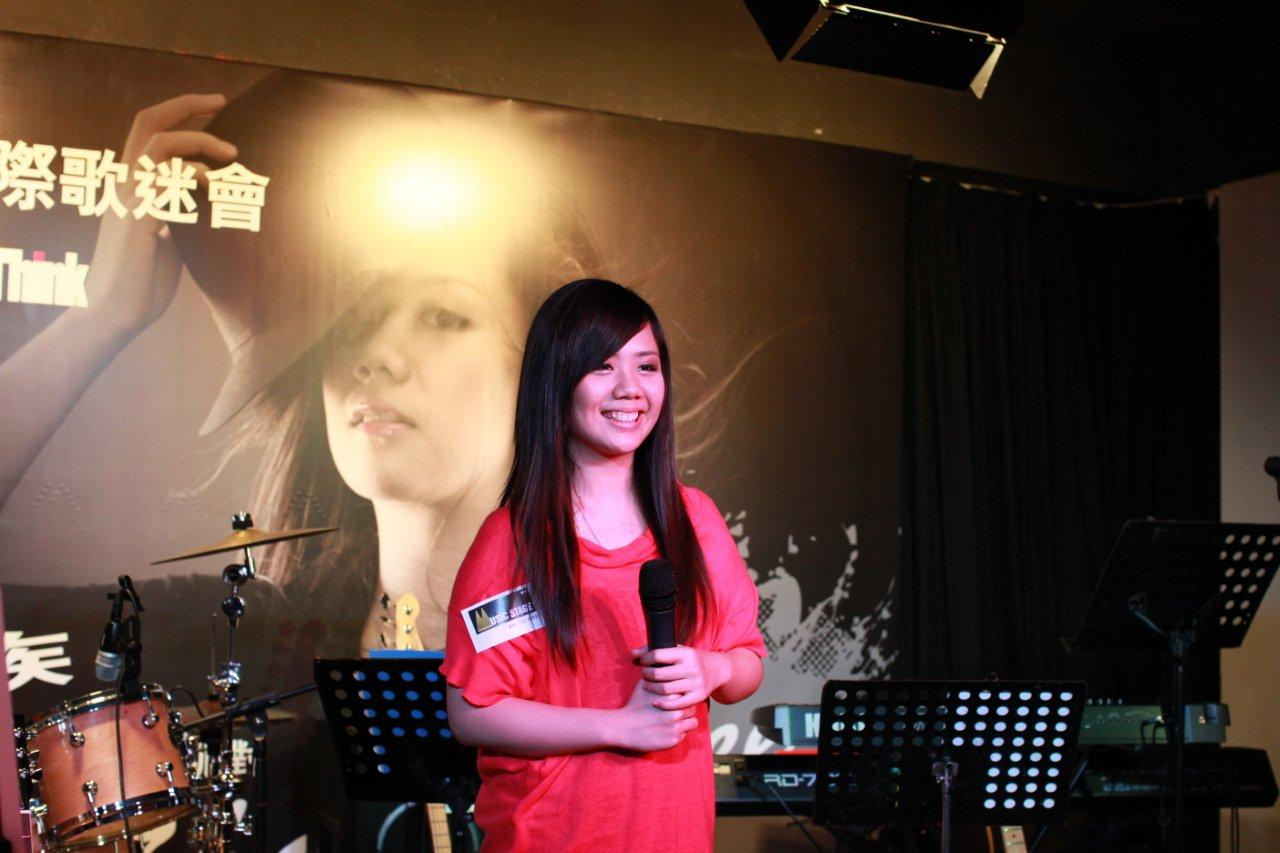

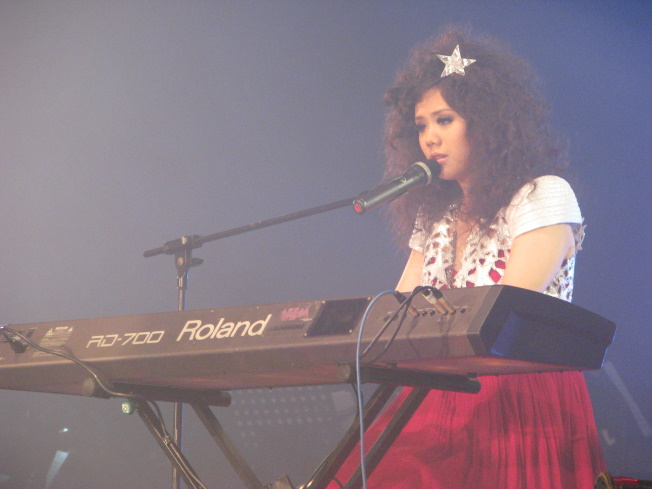

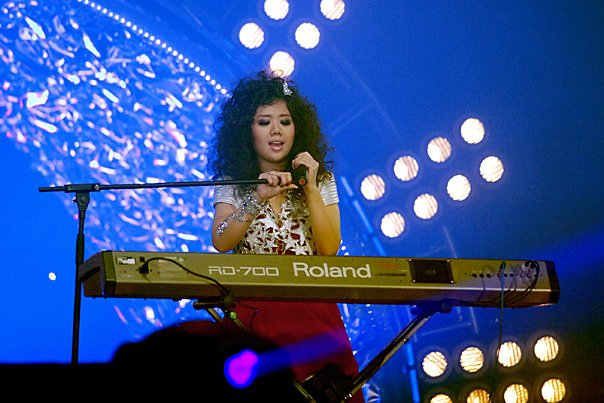

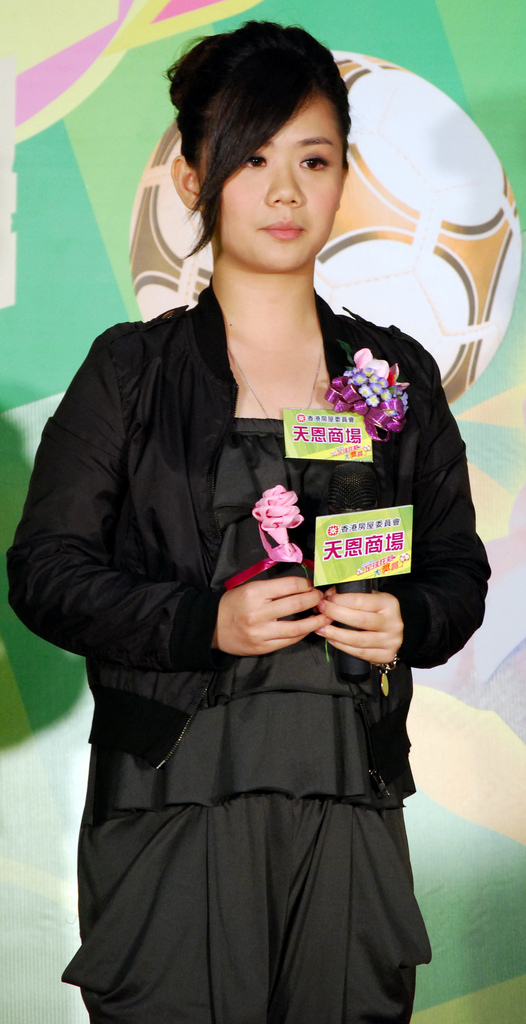

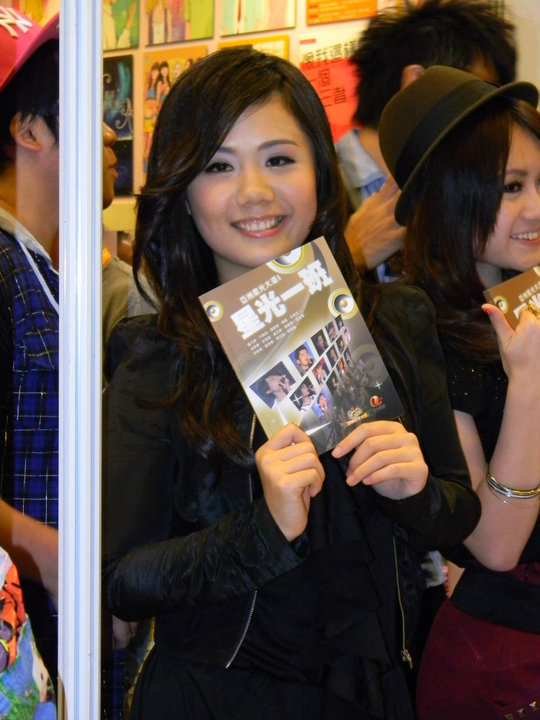

== Discography ==
(Asia Millionstar)《亞洲星光大道》

- Release Date:01/03/2010
- Tracks: 6. 愛上癮 (duet with Raymond Seen)
  7. 星光熠熠 (chorus with the finalists)
  9. 寫一首歌 (chorus with Season 1 contestants)
  10. 謝謝你 (chorus with Season 1 contestants)
- Label: Asia Television
- Notes: Compilation album with other Asian Millionstar Season 1 contestants

《Give it a Go (EP)》

- Release Date: 01/12/2010
- Tracks:1. Prelude (Cello Trio)
  2. 開一扇窗
  3. 捨棄
  4. 回味
  5. 小寵愛
  6. What a wonderful world

《Enchantment》

- Release Date: 21/7/2012
- Tracks:1. 情書
  2. Vincent
  3. 細訴
  4. 追
  5. 回頭
  6. 模稜兩可
  7. 珍惜
  8.開一扇窗
  9. 捨棄
  10. 回味

== Concerts ==
Concerts List
| Date | Name | No. of shows | Venue | Organiser | Notes |
| 16-17/02/2010 | 《3 Rock Your Dream 星光家族演唱會》 | 2 | Kowloonbay International Trade & Exhibition Centre | Asia Television, Hutchison 3G | Asia Millionstar Season 1 concert |
| 14/08/2010 | 《于天龍星光無限音樂會》 | 1 | Kowloonbay International Trade & Exhibition Centre | Harmony Productions | Guest performance |
| 21/11/2010 | 李昊嘉(Sharon Lee)《Give it a Go》 2010 迷你演唱會 | 1 | Hong Kong Institute of Education | Hong Kong Institute of Education Student Union, Sharon Lee International Fan Club | First individual concert |
| 22/04/2011 | 《我們的集體回憶音樂會》 | 1 | Sai Wan Ho Civic Centre | Green Splash Productions | Guest performance |

== Music videos ==
Music Videos List
| Song | Production Date | Production Unit |
| 萬歲師表 | 12/2009 | Hong Kong Institute of Education, Skyhigh Creative Partners |
| 開一扇窗 | 12/2010 | Asia Television |

== Filmography ==
=== Television (ATV) ===
第一屆《亞洲星光大道》 Asian Millionstar (2009): Contestant

Law Week 2009 Opening (2009): Guest performance

Housemen: Guest

Asia Millionstar (Season 2) (2010): Guest performance, challenger

The 15th Annual Most Popular TV Commercial Award: Guest performance

Asia Millionstar (Season 3) (2010): Guest performance, challenger

Starry Night (2010): Guest

After 11PM (2011): Host & Guest

== Books ==
- July 2010 – 星光一班 (Asian Millionstar Season 1)
