= Tim Lee =

Tim Lee or Timothy Lee may refer to:

== Arts and entertainment ==
=== Music ===
- Tim Lee, American musician, one of the duo The Windbreakers
- Tim Lee (musician) (born 1970), English musician, record producer, and DJ

=== Others in arts and entertainment ===
- Tim Lee (comedian), American stand-up comedian
- Tim Lee (screenwriter), Australian creator and screenwriter, creator of 2024 series Territory

== Others ==
- Timothy Lee Terrill (1815–1879), Canadian lawyer, farmer, and politician

== See also ==
- Tim Berners-Lee (born 1955), British engineer and computer scientist
- Timothy Lee Barnwell (born 1955), American author
- Tim Lee Carter (1910–1987), American politician
- Tim Lee Hall (1925–2008), American politician
- Tim Lee-Davey (born 1955), British former racing driver
