= Yong Lee =

American political scientist

Yong Lee is a political scientist. He was an Iowa State University Professor of Political Science with research interests in organizational theory, human resource management, and science policy. He taught at ISU for 27 years and endowed a scholarship that bears his name.

His most notable works include a book entitled A Reasonable Public Servant: Constitutional Foundations of Administrative Conduct in the United States. The book details case histories of issues surrounding human resource management and the law. Lee has argued that it is incorrect to think that government should be run as a business.

He says that, Unfortunately, many are led to believe this is the primary goal of public administration...the media and others have convinced the public that public administration should be able to function like business. Self-serving politicians preach this, too. They moralize that everything in government should be based on the consideration of economics and efficiency. All public administrators who enter upon public service take an ‘oath' affirming they will be faithful to the Constitution of the United States. If public administrators are to remain faithful to the Constitution then they need to defend the values, principles and ethics underpinning that document. When you get right down to it, I believe most people would agree fairness is the most important attribute for a public servant. However, the public are misguided by the market paradigm to believe efficiency and returns on investment be the guiding principles for a public servant.

Lee now serves as the director of the English Program at the Korean Development Institute's Graduate School of Public Policy and Management.
