= Paul Lee =

Paul Lee may refer to:

- Paul Lee (artist) (born 1974), British artist based in New York
- Paul Lee (basketball) (born 1989), Filipino basketball player
- Paul Lee (Canadian entrepreneur), video game developer, venture capitalist, businessman and entrepreneur
- Paul Lee (speedway rider) (born 1981), motorcycle speedway rider
- Paul Lee (television executive), British television executive, head of the US television network ABC
- Paul Sun-Hyung Lee (born 1972), Korean Canadian actor
- Paul Anthony Lee (born 1946), British lawyer and businessman
- Paul Lee (footballer) (born 1952), English professional footballer
- Paul Lee (soccer) (born 1961), Canadian international soccer player
- Paul Lee (environmentalist) (1931–2022), American philosopher and environmentalist
- Paul Lee (politician) (born 1960), member of the Alabama House of Representatives
- Paul Kyung Sang Lee (born 1960), Korean prelate of the Catholic Church
- Paul Lee (hurler) (born 1971), Irish hurler
- Paul Lee or Lee Bo (born 1950), see Causeway Bay Books disappearances
