= Holly Lee =

- Traditional Chinese: 黃楚喬
- Simplified Chinese: 黄楚乔
Transcriptions
Standard Mandarin
- Hanyu Pinyin: Huáng Chǔqiáo
Yue: Cantonese
- Jyutping: wong4 co2 kiu4

Holly Lee (Chinese: 黃楚喬; 1953–2024) was an artist-photographer, best known for her portraits project, the Hollian Thesaurus. She was one of the pioneers of conceptual photography in Hong Kong, experimenting with Photoshop to create composite photographs that were reminiscent of oil paintings. Her work has been collected by the Hong Kong Heritage Museum and M+ Museum.

Holly Lee began working as a professional photographer in 1980. She was one of the founders of Dislocation, a monthly photography journal in Hong Kong active from 1992 to 1998. In 1997, she re-located from Hong Kong to Toronto, Canada where she and Lee Ka Sing, an artist-photographer, set up INDEXG (a gallery and art studio space). The duo published online on a weekly periodical, Double Double by Ocean Pounds.

Lee died in September of 2024 at the age of 71.

== Career ==
In her first photography series, Pictures of My Friends, Artists and Others, Holly Lee photographed many artists and creatives in Hong Kong including Antonio Mak and Ann Hui. She was inspired by the portraits by Richard Avedon, which she described as "naked and intense". This series of black-and-white portraits featured the subject in the foreground against a white background.

Holly Lee is best known for her works in the Hollian Thesaurus project. The project consists of twelve portraits created between 1994 and 2000, contemplating and exploring a period of change in Hong Kong leading up to the handover of Hong Kong. Lee explored themes of East and West cultural dialogues and identities, often juxtaposing historical and contemporary elements.

Using digital manipulation, Lee combined photographs, sourced imagery and 19th-century export painting from Guangdong to create the Hollian Thesaurus portraits. The portraits are reminiscent of Renaissance oil paintings—Lee added fine lines to mimic the cracks in old oil paintings, creating an air of nostalgia. Her most recognised portrait, The Great Pageant Show, presents a Miss Hong Kong beauty pageant winner in the style of Queen Elizabeth II presented in front of a Qing court painting.

Works in the Hollian Thesaurus include:

- Madodhisattva, 1993
- Jinx, in Front of Hong Kong Harbor, circa 1994
- The White-Haired Girl, Pre-97 Version, 1995
- The Great Pageant Show, circa 1997
- Bauhinia, 1997
- Barbie The Great, Beauty Monopolizer, 2000

== List of selected works ==
Sources:

- Hollian Thesaurus, 1994–2000
- Dun Huang Series, 1991
- Footsteps of June Series, 1989
- Pictures of My Friends, Artists and Others, 1981–1986

== Awards ==
Sources:

- Asian Cultural Council Fellowship, 1994
- Award for Best in Multimedia—Pan Pacific Digital Artistry Competition, 1996
- Kodak Grand Award, Gold Award in Digital Imaging (Hong Kong Institute of Professional Photographers, 1993; 1995)

== Selected exhibitions ==
Solo Exhibitions

- Si-ling and Owltoise series, Photo Centre Gallery, Hong Kong, 1985
- Footsteps of June, La Cadre Gallery, 1989

Group Exhibitions

- What's Next 30x30, Shenzhen and Hong Kong, 2011
- YYZ Dialogue, Seven Toronto Artist in Response to the Poems of Leung Ping Kwan, Toronto, 2011
- Art+01: A Digital Exploration, Hong Kong Heritage Museum, Hong Kong, 2001
- Identities: Art in HKSAR Government Offices Abroad, Hong Kong Convention & Exhibition Centre, Hong Kong, 2000
- On Hong Kong—An Exhibition of Contemporary Photography, City Hall, Hong Kong, 1998
- New Voices—Contemporary Art from Hong Kong, Taipei, and Shanghai, Pao Galleries, Hong Kong Arts Centre, Zhung Zheng Gallery, National Taiwan Arts Education Institute, 1998
- Asia Cultural Council Group exhibition, Cultural Center of the Philippines, Philipiines, 1997
- Hong Kong Arts Festival, Berlin, Germany, 1997
- Hong Kong Portfolio, organised by the Asia Society at the Hong Kong Convention Centre and Fringe Gallery, Hong Kong, 1997
- Hong Kong‚ Four Perspectives, Chinese Cultural Centre, Vancouver, 1997
- Renga, a global art collaboration on the Internet, organised by Japan Telecom, 1997
- group Show on Alternative Photography, Shen Yang Luzun Art Academy, China, 1997
- New Images from Hong Kong, Tower Gallery, Yokohama, Japan, 1996
- 2+3+4 Dimension Digital Art Exhibition, Hong Kong Arts Centre, 1996
- Contemporary Photography from Mainland China, Hong Kong and Taiwan, Hong Kong Arts Centre, Hong Kong, 1994
- Asian Photography, Malaysia, 1986
