= Eric Lee =

Eric Lee may refer to:

- Eric Lee (labor organizer) (born 1955), American-born trade unionist, writer, and web site developer; founding editor of LabourStart
- Eric Lee (musician), Hawaiian musician, singer, songwriter, and producer
- Eric Lee (footballer) (1922–2012), English footballer
- Eric Lee (American football) (born 1994), American football defensive end
- Eric Lee (politician), American politician

== See also ==
- Eric Lee-Johnson (1908–1993), New Zealand artist and photographer
