= Francis Lee =

Francis Lee may refer to:

- Francis Lee (director), English actor and film director of God's Own Country
- Francis Lee (footballer) (1944–2023), English professional footballer.
- Francis Lee (physician) (1661–1719), English writer known for his connection with the Philadelphians
- Blair Lee I (Francis Preston Blair Lee, 1857–1944), Democratic member of the United States Senate
- Francis Joseph Lee (1857–1909), chess player
- Francis Lightfoot Lee (1734–1797), signer of the United States Declaration of Independence
  - SS Francis L. Lee, a Liberty ship
- Francis Nigel Lee (1934–2011), Christian theologian
- Francis D. Lee (1826–1885), American architect from Charleston, South Carolina
- Francis D. Lee (Nebraska politician), American politician from Nebraska
- Francis Lee (lyricist), contemporary Chinese-pop lyricist, writer
- Francis F. Lee (1927–2024), inventor, entrepreneur, and professor of electrical engineering and computer science
- Sir Francis Lee, 4th Baronet (1639–1667), English politician

== See also ==
- Frank Lee (disambiguation)
- Frances Lee (1906–2000), American actress
- Francis Leigh (disambiguation)
