= Howard Leigh (broadcaster) =

Australian journalist

Howard Leigh (born June 1940) is an Australian radio personality, sports journalist, and veteran boxing announcer from Melbourne, Australia.

== Boxing announcer ==
Leigh is a sports journalist, boxing and kick-boxing analyst and ring announcer, who has been on the sports scene in Melbourne for some 40 years.

Leigh is known for the brightly-coloured dinner suits he wears while performing as ring announcer at boxing and kick-boxing promotions around Australia. In September 2024, Leigh was inducted into the Australian National Boxing Hall of Fame for his forty-five years of service to the sport.

== Journalism ==
Leigh has had a long association with the Sunday Herald Sun newspaper in Melbourne, and is the current District and State cricket reporter, as well as being the Australian rules football reporter during the winter months.

== Radio career ==
Leigh was brought into the SEN 1116 radio fold in 2004 by his lawyer, Stephen J. Peak, and Tony Schibeci. Leigh has since become a key member of Gladiators of Sport and is titled, "Hollywood Maximus".

He also appears with Stephen J. Peak at Sport 927 on the Andrew Kuuse night time show "Sportstalk".

== 2006 Commonwealth Games ==
Leigh appeared as an announcer during the 2006 Commonwealth Games boxing events, although he was not allowed to perform his customary "in-the-ring" announcing role – instead calling from the commentary box.
