= Gary Lee (footballer) =

English footballer

Personal information
- Full name: Gary Lee
- Date of birth: 30 April 1966 (age 60)
- Place of birth: Doncaster, England
- Position: Defender

Youth career
- Doncaster Rovers

Senior career*
Years	Team	Apps	(Gls)
1984–1985	Doncaster Rovers	1	(0)
1985–?	Gainsborough Trinity		
	Armthorpe Welfare		(0)
- Goole
1992–1994	Boston United	64	(0)
1994–1997	Gainsborough Trinity		
- * Club domestic league appearances and goals

Gary Lee (born 30 April 1966) is an English former professional footballer who played as a defender.

== Career ==
Lee came through the academy at Doncaster Rovers and made a single first team appearance in the Football League. He later played for Gainsborough Trinity, Armthorpe Welfare and Goole before returning to Trinity in 1994.

== Personal life ==
Following retirement, Lee worked at Pilkington Glass in Doncaster.
