= Leigh (name) =

Leigh (/liː/ LEE) is both an English surname and a unisex given name meaning "meadow".

== Surname ==
- Leigh (surname)

== Given name ==
- Amee-Leigh Murphy Crowe (born 1995), Irish rugby sevens and union player
- Leigh Alexander (1898–1943), British army officer and cricketer
- Leigh Alexander (journalist) (born 1981), American author and journalist
- Leigh Daniel Avidan (born 1979), lead singer of Ninja Sex Party, Shadow Academy, and co-host of Game Grumps
- Leigh-Allyn Baker (born 1972), American actress
- Leigh Bardugo (born 1975), American writer
- Leigh Brackett (1915–1978), American science-fiction writer
- Leigh Brewer (1933–2013), New Zealand dancer and choreographer
- Leigh Broxham (born 1988), Australian footballer
- Leigh Davis (poet) (1955–2009), New Zealand-based writer
- Leigh Diffey (born 1971), Australian-American commentator
- Leigh Francis (born 1973), English comedian
- Leigh Griffiths (born 1990), Scottish footballer
- Leigh Halfpenny (born 1988), Welsh rugby union player
- Leigh Harline (1907–1969), American film composer and songwriter
- Leigh Hart (born 1970), New Zealand comedian and radio show host
- Leigh Ann Hester (born 1982), American soldier and Silver Star recipient
- Leigh Hulsey, member of the Alabama House of Representatives
- Leigh Hunt (1784–1859), English poet
- Leigh Kavanagh (born 2005), Irish footballer
- Leigh G. Kirkland (1873–1942), New York politician
- Leigh Lawson (born 1945), English actor and director
- Leigh Leigh (1975–1989), Australian murder victim
- Leigh McCloskey (born 1955), American actor
- Leigh Nash (born 1976), American singer-songwriter
- Leigh Ann Orsi (born 1981), American dancer and former actress
- Leigh-Anne Pinnock (born 1991), Bajan and Jamaican singer-songwriter from Little Mix
- Leigh Richmond (1911–1995), American writer
- Leigh Rubin, American cartoonist
- Leigh Sales (born 1973), Australian author and journalist
- Leigh Taylor-Young (born 1945), American actress
- Leigh Whannell (born 1977), Australian screenwriter
- Leigh Wood, English boxer

== Fictional characters ==
- Amyas Leigh, fictional character from Charles Kingsley's novel Westward Ho!
- Leigh Cabot, fictional character in the Stephen King novel Christine and its film adaptation
- Sir Leigh Teabing, fictional character in the popular 2003 novel The Da Vinci Code and the 2006 film based on it
- Brenda Leigh Johnson, fictional character in the American television police procedural The Closer, played by Kyra Sedgwick

== See also ==
- Leah: Name, Hebrew, known from biblical character
