= Lauranett Lee =

American historian, educator, and curator (born c. 1956)

- Born: Lauranett Lorraine Lee c. 1956 (age 69–70); Chesterfield County, Virginia, U.S.
- Education: Mundelein College, Virginia State University, University of Virginia
- Occupations: Independent historian, educator, curator, author
- Known for: Civil War, Reconstruction, African-American history

Lauranett Lorraine Lee (born c. 1956) is an American historian, educator, curator, and author. She is a professor at the University of Richmond, and the founding curator for African American History in the Virginia Museum of History and Culture. She specializes in study of the Civil War, Reconstruction, Virginia state history, and African-American history.

== Early life and education ==
Lauranett L. Lee was born in Chesterfield County, and was raised near Bon Air. Lee's mother work as a computer operator for the U.S. Defense Supply Center.

Lee received a B.A. degree in communications from Mundelein College (now Loyola University Chicago) in Chicago; followed by a M.A. degree from Virginia State University; and a PhD in 2002 from University of Virginia. She studied under Edgar Toppin at VSU, who greatly influenced her work. Her doctoral thesis, Crucible in the Classroom: The Freedpeople and Their Teachers Charlottesville, Virginia, 1861–1876, was on the teachers of the freed people of Charlottesville, Virginia, such as Philena Carkin, a white northern schoolteacher who moved to Charlottesville to teach African Americans after the Civil War.

== Career ==
Lee had lived in Raleigh, Chicago and Atlanta before returning home to Virginia in 1988, to be closer to family. She had started her career working as a teacher in middle school and high school with the Chesterfield County Public Schools.

From 2000 to 2016, Lee worked at the Virginia Historical Society, now the Virginia Museum of History and Culture. Starting in 2011, she led the development of a database called "Unknown No Longer: A Database of Virginia Slave Names," to help genealogists and families identify people who were once enslaved. Lee wrote a book, "Making the American Dream Work: A Cultural History of African Americans in Hopewell, Virginia" (2008, Morgan James Publishing) on the cultural history of African Americans in Hopewell, Virginia.

She was appointed to an advisory council on Virginia's executive mansion. She discussed the history of Juneteenth at Virginia governor Ralph Northam's press conference on making it a state holiday.

As of 2023, Lee is a candidate for Chesterfield County School Board in the Midlothian District.

== Writings ==
- Lee, Lauranett L. (2008). Making the American Dream Work: A Cultural History of African Americans in Hopewell, Virginia. Hampton, VA: Morgan James Publishing. ISBN 9781600374661.
