= Fred Lee (cricketer, born 1871) =

English cricketer (1871–1914)

Personal information
- Full name: Frederick Marshall Lee
- Born: 8 January 1871; Kensington, London
- Died: 18 November 1914 (aged 43); Wonford, Exeter, Devon
- Batting: Right-handed
- Bowling: Left-arm orthodox spin
- Role: Batsman

Domestic team information
- Years: Team
- 1895: Kent
- 1902–1907: Somerset
- First-class debut: 13 June 1895 Kent v Marylebone Cricket Club (MCC)
- Last First-class: 7 August 1907 Somerset v Middlesex

Career statistics
Competition	First-class
Matches	79
Runs scored	2,253
Batting average	19.42
100s/50s	0/8
Top score	83
Balls bowled	242
Wickets	4
Bowling average	47.50
5 wickets in innings	0
10 wickets in match	0
Best bowling	3/17
Catches/stumpings	58/–
- Source: CricInfo, 18 June 2010

Frederick Marshall Lee (8 January 1871 – 18 November 1914) played first-class cricket for Kent and Somerset County Cricket Clubs between 1895 and 1907. He was born in Kensington in London and died at Wonford near Exeter in Devon.

Educated at Uppingham School and the Royal Agricultural College, Lee was a right-handed batsman and an occasional left-arm spin bowler. He made his first-class cricket debut in two matches for Kent in 1895; in the first of these, he made 12 in his first innings against Marylebone Cricket Club (MCC), including W. G. Grace, and 0 in his second innings. But in his second match, against Middlesex, he failed to score in either innings and he did not appear for Kent again.

In the 1902 season, Lee reappeared in first-class cricket as a lower order batsman for Somerset. He played seven matches in 1902 without great success, but in 1903 and 1904 he was a regular member of the team. He made little impact in 1903 until, coming in at no. 9 for Somerset at 142 for seven wickets against a Gloucestershire total of 172, he made an unbeaten 73, which helped them to a match-winning lead. A week later, Lee played a second innings of 73 and this time the match was more sensational. Somerset had trailed Lancashire by 68 runs on the first innings in the match at Old Trafford, but batted steadily in the second innings. Lee came in at 211 for six wickets and his 73, the top score of the innings, helped Somerset to a total of 361, after which Len Braund and Beaumont Cranfield bowled Lancashire out for 111 to complete a Somerset victory by 182 runs. Lee's lower order success saw him moved up the Somerset batting order and in August in the match against Middlesex at Taunton he made 83 in a high-scoring match, and this proved to be the highest score of his first-class career. In the 1903 season, Lee made 627 runs at an average of 23.22.

Lee's figures for the 1904 season were even better: 677 runs at an average of 25.07. His best game of the season was against the South Africans, when he top-scored in both innings with an unbeaten 79 in the first and 39 in the second. Having played in every County Championship match in 1904, Lee became less regular and less successful in 1905 and 1906, playing in a dozen games each season and passing 50 only once. In 1907, he appeared in only seven matches, and though he made 71, the top score of the match, in a very tight game at Bath against Lancashire, he mustered only 85 runs in 11 other innings and when he lost his place in the team he did not manage to regain it.

The son of a merchant, Lee was the main investor behind the initial work of Edward Raymond Turner in developing a method of showing cinematic film in colour. Lee and Turner patented the Lee-Turner process in 1900, although Lee's sold his interest in the project to Charles Urban in 1902.

Lee lived with his brother at Chard in Somerset. He died at Wonford House Hospital, a psychiatric hospital, in Devon in November 1914 aged 43.

== Bibliography ==
- Carlaw, Derek (2020). Kent County Cricketers, A to Z: Part One (1806–1914) (PDF). Cardiff: ACS.
