= Christian Lee =

Christian Lee may refer to:

- Christian Lee (footballer) (born 1976)
- Christian Lee (fighter) (born 1998)

== See also ==
- Chris Chan Lee, Asian American filmmaker
