= By the Fireside =

- Born: By The Fireside
- Origin: London, England
- Genres: Experimental; Alternative rock
- Occupations: Record producer singer-songwriter
- Instruments: Guitar vocals keyboards
- Years active: 2004–present
- Label: Rogue Records
- Website: www.by-the-fireside.com

By the Fireside is a musical artist from the United Kingdom.

By The Fireside recorded two extended play releases, first Battles that Add Up to None followed by Then Came Noon. Both were released in 2007 under the name By the Fireside, and both achieved moderate success. By The Fireside recorded the debut album The Great Hartford Fire in late 2007, and released it on 26 January 2008 through the Australian-based record label, Rogue Records, a sub-company of and Inertia Distribution. The album followed the mystery of the Hartford circus fire in Connecticut in 1944. By The Fireside recorded the album in his own self-built home studio. Responses to the album from reviewers have been positive.
