= Lee (given name) =

- Gender: Unisex

Origin
- Origin: Great Britain
- Meaning: From the English word 'lee', meaning "shelter(ed), protection, haven, sanctuary".
- Region of origin: Great Britain

Lee is a unisex given name from the English word 'lee'. It is also used as a surname, often confused with the Old English surname and given name leah ("clearing; meadow"), which evolved to 'leigh' in Middle English, and present-day 'lea' with the same meaning.

According to the Social Security Administration's popular baby name database, its popularity peaked in the United States in the early 1900s ranking 39 as a masculine name, and in 1955 ranking 182 as a feminine name. The name's popularity declined steadily in the second half of the 20th century, falling below rank 1000 by 1991 as a feminine name, and to 698 as of 2021 as a masculine name. In the later 20th century, it also gained some popularity in the United Kingdom, peaking among the 20 most popular boys' names during the 1970s to 1980s, but it had fallen out of the top 100 by 2001.

Lee is also a hypocoristic form of the given names Ashley, Beverly, Kimberley, Leona, and Leslie (all of which are also derived from English placenames containing -leah as a second element; with the possible exception of Leslie, which may be an anglicization of a Gaelic placename).

== People ==
=== A–G ===
- Lee Alexander, several people
- Lee Allen (musician) (1927–1994), American tenor saxophonist
- Lee Anderson (born 1967), British Reform UK politician and television presenter
- Lee Andrews (1936–2016), American singer, leader of the doo-wop group Lee Andrews & the Hearts
- Lee Baca (born 1942), American law enforcement officer and convicted felon
- Lee Badgett (born 1960), American economist
- Lee Barkell, Canadian figure skating coach and former figure skater
- Lee Barnard (born 1984), English footballer
- Lee Batchelor (1865–1911), Australian politician
- Lee Baxandall (1935–2008), American writer, translator, editor, and activist
- Lee Beevers (born 1983), English professional footballer
- Lee Phillip Bell (1928–2020), American talk show host
- Lee Berger (biologist) (born 1970), Australian biologist
- Lee Berger (paleoanthropologist) (born 1965), American-born South African paleoanthropologist
- Lee Bergere (1918–2007), American actor
- Lee Bell (born 1983), English professional footballer and manager
- Lee Bermejo, American comic book writer and artist
- Lee Boardman (born 1972), English actor
- Lee R. Bobker (1925–1999), American writer, film director and producer
- Lee Bontecou (1931–2022), American sculptor and printmaker
- Prince Lee Boo (c. 1764–1784), British ruler of Koror
- Lee Botts (1928–2019), American environmentalist
- Lee Bouggess (1948–2024), American football player
- Lee Bowyer (born 1977), English footballer
- Lee Boxell (born 1973), British schoolboy who disappeared
- Lee Boylan (born 1978), English footballer
- Lee Boysel (1938–2021), American electrical engineer
- Lee Bracegirdle (born 1952), Australian-American composer, horn player and conductor
- Lee Bradbury (born 1975), English football manager and former player
- Lee Brand (born 1949), American politician
- Lee Breuer (1937–2021), American theatre director
- Lee Brewster (1943–2000), American drag queen, transgender activist, and retailer
- Lee Brice (born 1979), American country music singer and songwriter
- Lee Bright (born 1970), American politician
- Lee Brown, several people
- Lee Casciaro (born 1981), Gibraltarian footballer
- Lee Camp (footballer) (born 1984), Northern Irish footballer
- Lee C. Camp American theologian and academic.
- Lee Cattermole (born 1988), English footballer
- Lee Cazort (1887–1969), American lawyer and politician
- Lee Child (born 1954), British author
- Lee Clark, several people
- Lee J. Cobb (1911–1976), American actor
- Lee Cole (field hockey) (born 1995), Irish field hockey player
- Lee Cole (writer), American writer
- Lee Croft (born 1985), English footballer
- Lee Cutler (born 1995), English professional boxer
- Lee Daniels (born 1959), American film and television producer, director and screenwriter
- Lee Denney (born 1953), American politician
- Lee DeWyze (born 1986), American singer and the winner of Season 9 of American Idol
- Lee R. Dice (1887–1977), American ecologist and geneticist
- Lee Dickson (born 1985), English rugby player
- Lee Dixon (born 1964), English footballer
- Lee Dorman (1942–2012), American bassist known for Iron Butterfly
- Lee Dorrian (born 1968), singer, Napalm Death, Cathedral
- Lee Alvin DuBridge (1901–1994), American educator and physicist
- R. Lee Ermey (1944–2018), American Marine drill instructor and actor
- Lee Elder (1934–2021), American professional golfer
- Lee Erwin, several people
- Lee Evans, several people
- Lee Fang (born 1986), American journalist
- Lee Farr (1927–2017), American actor
- Lee Feldman (businessman) (born 1967/68), American lawyer and businessman
- Lee Felsenstein (born 1945), American computer engineer
- Lee Fields (born 1950), American soul singer
- Lee Fisher (born 1951), American attorney, politician, and academic
- Lee Fierro (1929–2020), American actress
- Lee de Forest (1873–1961), American inventor
- Lee Foss, American producer and DJ
- Lee Fohl (1876–1965), American baseball player and manager
- Lee W. Fulton (1910–1976), American United States Air Force general
- Lee Garmes (1898–1978), American cinematographer
- Lee Garlington (1937–2023), American actor and stockbroker
- Lee Gaze (born 1975), guitarist for Lostprophets
- Lee Germon (born 1968), New Zealand cricket player
- Lee Gibson (born 1991), Scottish footballer
- Lee Gilmour (born 1978), English international footballer
- Lee Goldberg (born 1962), American author, screenwriter, publisher and producer
- Lee Goldberg, American meteorologist, chief meteorologist of WABC-TV
- Lee E. Goodman (born 1964), American government official
- Lee Grant (disambiguation), several people
- Lee Greenwood (born 1942), American country music singer known for the song "God Bless the USA"
- Lee Grosscup (1936–2020), American football player and sportscaster
- Lee Guerette (1949–2025), American politician
- Elbert Lee Guillory (born 1944), Louisiana African-American Republican

=== H–M ===
- Lee Hall (artist) (1934–2017), American abstract expressionist painter, educator, writer, university president
- Lee Harding (born 1983), Australian singer
- Lee Harvey Oswald (1939–1963), assassin of John F. Kennedy
- Lee Hendrie (born 1977), English footballer
- Lee Hughes (born 1976), English footballer
- Lee Hunter (disambiguation), multiple people
- Lee Iacocca (1924–2019), American businessman, chairman of Chrysler Corporation
- Lee Ingleby (born 1976), English actor
- Lee J. Ames (1921–2011), American artist
- Lee J. Cobb (1911–1976), American actor
- Lee Goldstein, American politician
- Lee James (disambiguation)
- Lee Jung-eun, several people
- Lee Johnson (disambiguation)
- Lee Kernaghan (born 1964), Australian country music singer, songwriter and guitarist
- Lee Kerslake (1947–2020), English musician
- Lee Kiefer, American fencer, 2021 Olympic gold medalist
- Lee King, several people
- Lee Konitz (1927–2020), American jazz alto saxophonist
- Lee Korzits (born 1984), Israeli world champion windsurfer
- Lee Krasner (1908–1984), American abstract expressionist painter
- Lee Lawrie (1877–1963), American architectural sculptor
- Lee Leffingwell (born 1939), American environmentalist and politician
- Lee Lorenz (1932–2022), American cartoonist
- Lee Loughnane (born 1946), American musician
- Lee Mack (born 1968), English comedian and actor
- Lee Majors (born 1939), American actor
- Lee Boyd Malvo (born 1985), one of the two D.C. Snipers
- Lee Marshall (disambiguation), several people
- Lee Martin (disambiguation), several people
- Lee Marvin (1924–1987), American actor
- Lee Matthews (footballer) (born 1979), English football striker
- Lee Matthews (singer) (born 1988), Irish pop singer formerly known as Lee Mulhern, also known as Lee.M
- Lee Mavers (born 1962), English musician
- Lee McConnell (born 1978), Scottish track and field athlete
- Lee McCulloch (born 1978), Scottish footballer
- Lee McKenzie (born 1977), Scottish journalist and presenter
- Lee Meadows (1894–1963), American professional baseball player
- Lee Meriwether (born 1935), American actress
- Lee Merritt (born 1983), American civil rights lawyer and activist
- Lee Metcalf (1911–1978), American lawyer, judge, and politician
- Lee Miller (1907–1977), American fashion model, photographer, war photojournalist
- Lee Minto (born 1927), American women's health advocate and sex education activist
- Lee Montague (1927–2025), English actor
- Lee Morgan (1938–1972), American hard bop trumpeter
- Lee Mossop (born 1989), English rugby player
- Lee Mullican (1919–1998), American painter, curator, and art teacher
- Lee Murray (disambiguation), several people

=== N–Z ===
- Lee Nailon (born 1975), American NBA basketball player and 2007 Israeli Basketball Premier League MVP
- Lee Naylor (disambiguation)
- Lee Nelson, several people
- Lee Newton (born 1985), American actress and comedian
- Lee Nguyen (born 1986), American soccer player
- Lee Nicholls (born 1992), English footballer
- Lee Norris (born 1981), American actor
- Lee Novak (born 1988), English footballer
- Lee O'Connor (disambiguation), several people
- Lee Ocran (1945–2019), Ghanaian politician
- Lee Olesky, American business executive
- Lee Oser, American novelist and literary critic
- Lee Oskar (born 1948), Danish harmonica player
- Lee Oxenham, American politician
- Lee Pace (born 1979), American actor
- Lee Paje (born 1980), Filipino visual artist
- Lee Patrick (disambiguation), several people
- Lee Peacock (born 1976), Scottish professional footballer
- Lee Pete (1924–2010), American sports-talk radio broadcaster and college athlete
- Lee Peltier (born 1986), English footballer
- Lee "Scratch" Perry (1936–2021), Jamaican musician
- Lee Pomeroy, English musician
- Lee Powell (actor) (1908–1944), American actor
- Lee Powell (footballer) (born 1973), Welsh footballer
- Lee Pressman (1906–1969), American labor attorney and US government functionary
- Lee Price, United States Army officer
- Lee Probert (born 1972), English football referee
- Lee Quiñones (born 1960 as George Quiñones), American graffiti artist
- Lee Ranaldo (born 1956), guitarist (and occasional vocalist) for Sonic Youth
- Lee Remick (1935–1991), American actress
- Lee Richard (1948–2023), American baseball player
- Lee Greene Richards (1878–1950), American painter
- Lee Rigby, British soldier murdered by Islamists in Woolwich, London
- Lee Riley (1932–2011), American football player
- Lee Ritenour (born 1952), American jazz guitarist
- Lee Roberts (actor) (1913–1989), American actor
- Lee Roberts (basketball) (born 1987), American basketball player
- Lee Roberts (finance executive), American finance executive and university administrator
- Lee Robertson (born 1973), Scottish footballer
- Lee Robinson (disambiguation), several people
- Lee Rogers (disambiguation), several people
- Lee Ryan (born 1983), English singer
- Lee Sampson (born 1939), Canadian football player
- Lee Sandales, set decorator
- Lee Sharpe (born 1971), English footballer
- Lee Smith (disambiguation)
- Lee Snoots (1892–1968), American football player
- Lee Standifer (1957–1981), American murder victim
- Lee Stecklein (born 1994), American ice hockey player
- Lee Stensness (born 1970), New Zealand rugby player
- Lee Stevens (born 1967), American baseball player
- Lee Strobel (born 1952), Christian apologist
- Lee Summers (born 1958), American actor, singer, librettist, composer, director and theatre producer
- Lee Tamahori (1950–2025), New Zealand film director
- Lee Tergesen (born 1965), American actor
- Lee Tockar (born 1969), Canadian Actor
- Lee Trevino (born 1939), American golfer
- Chrystelle Lee Trump Bond (1938–2020), American dancer, choreographer, and dance historian
- Lee Trundle (born 1976), English footballer
- Lee Unkrich (born 1967), American director, editor, screenwriter and animator
- Lee Van Cleef (1925–1989), American actor
- Lee Ving (born 1950), guitarist and singer of the American hardcore punk band Fear
- Lee Bee Wah (born 1960), Singaporean politician and engineer
- Lee Westwood (born 1973), English golfer
- Lee C. White (1923–2013), advisor to President Kennedy and Johnson
- Lee Wiley (1908–1975), American jazz singer from the big band era
- Lee Williamson (born 1982), Jamaican footballer
- Lee Williamson (American football), American football player
- Lee Winter, Australian novelist
- Lee Wyatt (1890–1960), justice of the Supreme Court of Georgia
- Lee Zeldin (born 1980), Republican United States Congressman, former New York state senator
- Lee Allen Zeno (1954–2026), American bassist

=== People called Leee ===
Some people spell their name with three Es instead of two:

- Leee Black Childers (1945–2014), American avant-garde photographer and music manager
- Leee John (born 1957), British pop musician

== Fictional characters ==
- Lee, a character in 1993 action/martial arts film Showdown
- Lee, a character in the 1997 American comedy film Fathers' Day
- Lee, played by Lee Mack in his sitcom Not Going Out
- Lee, a character played by actor JR Reed in association with the comedy rock band Tenacious D
- Lee, a character played by actor Timothée Chalamet in Luca Guadagnino's film Bones and All
- Lee Abbott, a character in the television show, A Quiet Place
- Lee Adama, character in the television series Battlestar Galactica
- Lee Bodecker, character from the American film, The Devil All the Time
- Lee Brackett, a character in the horror film Halloween
- Lee Clark (The Amazing Spiez!), a character on the animation series The Amazing Spiez!
- Sheldon Lee Cooper, a character on the television sitcom The Big Bang Theory
- L For Leeeeee x, a bear played by Scottish YouTuber Lee Carson on stampylonghead's channel until 2015
- Lee Chaolan, character in the Tekken series
- Lee Everett, the protagonist in the 2012 video game The Walking Dead
- Lee Forrester, a Marvel Comics character
- Lee Harker, the protagonist of the 2024 horror film Longlegs
- Lee Harris, a character in the television series American Horror Story: Roanoke
- Lee Jordan, a character in the Harry Potter series
- Lee Kanker, oldest of the Kanker sisters on Ed, Edd n Eddy
- Lee Lee, a character in Dexter's Laboratory
- Lee McDermott, a character in Desperate Housewives
- Lee Montgomery, a character in the Quentin Tarantino film Death Proof
- Lee, a video games character appear in first Street Fighter
- Lee Ping, the protagonist of the television series Detentionaire
- Lee Pollock, character from American mystery crime drama series, The Edge of Night
- Lee Posner, character from the British television soap opera, Emmerdale
- Lee Price, character appearing in comic books published by Marvel Comics
- Lee Scoresby, a character in Philip Pullman's His Dark Materials trilogy
- Lee Sin, the Blind Monk, a playable champion character in the action real-time strategy video game League of Legends
- Lee, a video game character in Gothic franchise

== See also ==
- List of people with surname Lee
- Lee (Korean surname)
- Leigh (disambiguation)
- Lea (disambiguation)
- Leah (name)
- Leeland (given name)
