= Garlington =

Garlington is a surname. It may refer to:

- Albert Creswell Garlington (1822–1885), brigadier general in the South Carolina Militia
- Ernest Albert Garlington (1853–1934), U.S. Army general, Medal of Honor recipient for participation in Battle of Wounded Knee
- John Garlington (1946–2000), American football player
- Lee Garlington (1937–2023), American actor and stockbroker
- Lee Garlington (born 1953), American television actress

Garlington is also a given name. It may refer to:

- Garlington Jerome Sutton, known as G. J. Sutton (1909–1976), American politician
