= General Price =

General Price may refer to:

- Cedric Rhys Price (1905–1987), British Army major general
- Charles F. B. Price (1881–1954), U.S. Marine Corps lieutenant general
- Charles Basil Price (1889–1975), Canadian Army major general
- Denis Price (1908–1966), British Army major general
- John Price (British Army officer) (died 1747), British Army major general
- Lee Price (1970s–2010s), U.S. Army major general
- Sterling Price (1809–1867), Confederate States Army major general
- Thomas Lawson Price (1809–1870), Missouri Militia brevet major general
- William G. Price Jr. (1869–1960), Pennsylvania National Guard major general

== See also ==
- Henry ap Rhys Pryce (1874–1950), British Indian Army general
- Attorney General Price (disambiguation)
