= Albert Garlington =

Albert Garlington may refer to:

- Ernest Albert Garlington (1853–1934), U.S. Army general and Medal of Honor recipient
- Albert Creswell Garlington (1822–1885), brigadier general in the South Carolina Militia
