= Erin Gee =

Erin Gee may refer to:

- Erin Gee (composer)
- Erin Gee (artist)
