= Alexander Lee =

Alexander Lee may refer to:

- Alexander Lee (priest) (died 1503), Canon of Windsor
- Alexander Sebastien Lee (fl. 2008), American actor
- Alexander Lee (entertainer) (born 1988), singer, actor and host in South Korea

== See also ==
- Alex Lee (disambiguation)
- Alexander Lees (disambiguation)
- Lee Alexander (disambiguation)
