= General Fulton =

General Fulton may refer to:

- Harry Fulton (1869–1918), British Army brigadier general
- Lee W. Fulton (1910–1976), U.S. Air Force major general
- Robert Fulton (Royal Marines officer) (born 1948), British Royal Marine lieutenant general
