= Patrick Lee =

Patrick Lee may refer to:

- Pat Lee (American football) (Patrick Christopher Lee, born 1984), cornerback for the Green Bay Packers
- Patrick Lee (actor) (born 1979), Taiwanese actor
- Patrick Lee (bishop) (1931–2010), Anglican bishop in Canada
- Patrick Lee (Chinese businessman), founder of Lee & Man Paper in Hong Kong
- Patrick Lee (medical researcher), reovirus and cancer therapy researcher at Dalhousie University
- Patrick Lee (novelist) (born 1976), American author
- Patrick Lee (painter) (born 1948), Taiwanese painter
- Patrick A. Lee (born 1946), professor of physics
- Patrick Lee (banker) (born 1972), Singapore based banker, CEO of Standard Chartered Singapore
- Patrick Y. Lee, one of the founders of Rotten Tomatoes

== See also ==
- Pat Lee (disambiguation)
- Lee Patrick (disambiguation)
