= Lee Rogers =

Lee Rogers may refer to:

- Lee Rogers (American singer) "I Want You To Have Everything" 1965, "Sex Appeal" 1968
- Lee Rogers (Northern Irish singer) (born 1977), Northern Irish singer-songwriter
- Lee Rogers (baseball) (1913–1995), American Major League Baseball pitcher
- Lee Rogers (podiatrist) (born 1978), American podiatrist and politician
- Lee Rogers (racing driver) (born 1972), British racing driver
- Lee Rogers (novelist), American pseudonym used by Robert "Bob" Rogers
- Lee Rogers (footballer, born 1967), English football defender born in Bristol
- Lee Rogers (footballer, born 1966), English football defender born in Doncaster, West Riding of Yorkshire
