= Alex Lee =

Alex Lee may refer to:

- Alex Lee (artist), American and South Korean artist
- Alex Lee (Australian footballer) (1908–1996), Australian rules footballer
- Alex Lee (comedian) (born 1986/7), Australian comedian, actor, and television presenter
- Alex Lee (Guamanian footballer) (born 1990), Guamanian soccer player
- Alex Lee (musician) (born 1970), English musician
- Alex Lee (politician) (born 1995), American politician from California
- Alex Lee (television personality) (born 1992), English participant on Big Brother TV series
- Alex Lee Inc., an American grocery retailer, wholesaler, and distributor

== See also ==
- Alexander Lee (disambiguation)
