= Paje =

Paje may refer to:

== Places ==
- Paje, Botswana
- Paje, Zanzibar, Tanzania
- Pajé River, Ceará, Brazil

== People ==
- Lee Paje (born 1980), Filipino visual artist
- Ramón Paje (born 1960), Filipino politician
