= Attorney General Price =

Attorney General Price may refer to:

- John G. Price (1871–1930), Attorney General of Ohio
- William Herbert Price (1877–1963), Attorney General of Ontario

== See also ==
- General Price (disambiguation)
