= Alexander Lees =

Alexander Lees may refer to:

- Alexander Leese of the Leese Baronets
- Alex Lees, English cricketer

== See also ==
- Alexander Lee (disambiguation)
