= Mr. Bo =

American singer

- Born: Louis Collins; April 7, 1932; Indianola, Mississippi, United States
- Died: September 19, 1995 (aged 63) Detroit, Michigan, United States
- Genres: Electric blues
- Occupations: Guitarist, singer, songwriter
- Instruments: Guitar, vocals
- Years active: 1950s–1995

Louis Collins (April 7, 1932 – September 19, 1995), known professionally as Mr. Bo, was an American electric blues guitarist, singer and songwriter. Primarily working as a live performer in Detroit for four decades, his co-written song, "If Trouble Was Money", was later recorded by both Charlie Musselwhite and Albert Collins.

== Biography ==
Louis Collins was born in Indianola, Mississippi, United States. Despite his early interest in country music, Collins family relocated in 1946 to Chicago, Illinois, where he acquired his first guitar as a present from his older brother, McKinley. In 1951, the family moved again to Baldwin, Michigan, before settling in Detroit a couple of years later. His conversion to the blues was sparked by seeing T-Bone Walker in concert and then similarly, in 1959, B.B. King. King's influence on Collins guitar playing and vocal style, stayed with Collins throughout his career. Collins acquired his nickname of Mr. Bo from his sibling, McKinley, who likewise was widely known as Little Mac.

In 1956, Mr. Bo took his first steps towards a professional musical career by joining Washboard Willie's backing ensemble, where he met and befriended both Willie and Little Sonny. Two years later, Mr. Bo formed his own band with his brother Little Mac playing bass. His debut single, "I'm Leaving This Town", was released in 1960 on Northern Records. A series of single releases followed throughout that decade and beyond, on labels including Reel, and the closely affiliated Big D and Diamond Jim. The billing changed between the singular Mr. Bo, and Mr. Bo & His Blues Boys, the latter combo invariably featuring his brother. His fluid guitar work and steady vocals were major features, with the recording of "If Trouble Was Money", being the stand out offering. The song was co-written by the Collins brothers, and went on to be recorded by both Charlie Musselwhite and Albert Collins. Throughout Mr. Bo continued with regular Detroit-based live club appearances, although his presence grew less prominent in the 1970s and 1980s. Mr. Bo's recording outlet had diminished when local entrepreneur, Diamond Jim Riley, (owner of the Big D and Diamond Jim record labels) was shot dead in May 1971. In 1972, Mr. Bo released "Plenty Fire Below" on the Gold Top label, which he co-owned along with Lee Rogers. He followed this with a performance with his backing band, as part of a Detroit blues package, at the 1973 Ann Arbor Blues and Jazz Festival. A live recording of Mr. Bo's performance of, "Don't Want No Woman", from that concert, was a track on Motor City Blues - Please Mr. Foreman (1996).

In 1993, Mr. Bo traveled to Europe for the first time and appeared at the Blues Estafette in the Netherlands. In 1995, he returned to the recording studio for the first time in over 20 years to record the album, If Trouble Was Money, for Blue Suit Records. Before he had time to advance his career, on September 19, 1995, Mr. Bo died of pneumonia at Detroit's Harper University Hospital, at the age of 63. He had been granted the Detroit Blues Society Lifetime Achievement Award earlier the same year.

Four of his unreleased tracks were issued by Relic on Three Shades of Blues, which also featured material by Eddie Kirkland and Bennie McCain and the Ohio Untouchables.

== Discography ==
=== Singles ===
Year	Title (A-side / B-side)	Record label	Credited to				
Year	Title (A-side / B-side)	Record label	Credited to	1960	"I'm Leaving This Town" / "Times Hard"	Northern Records	Mr. Bo
1962	"Heartache and Troubles" / "Calipso Blues"	Reel Records	Mr. Bo				
1966	"I Ain't Gonna Suffer" / "If Trouble Was Money"	Big D Records	Mr. Bo & His Blues Boys				
1966	"Santa's on His Way" / "Let's Go to the Party"	Big D Records	Mr. Bo & His Blues Boys				
1967	"Lost Love Affair (Pt. 1)" / "Lost Love Affair (Pt. 2)"	Big D Records	Mr. Bo & His Blues Boys				
1968	"Baby Your Hair Looks Bad" / "Night Walkers"	Diamond Jim Records	Mr. Bo & His Blues Boys				
1968	"Early in the Morning" / "Never Love Again"	Diamond Jim Records	Mr. Bo				
1972	"Plenty Fire Below (Part 1)" / "Plenty Fire Below (Part 2)"	Gold Top Records	Mr. Bo				

=== Albums ===
Year	Title	Record label
1996	If Trouble Was Money	Blue Suit Records

== See also ==
- List of electric blues musicians
