= Alex Lee (artist) =

American and South Korean artist (born 1982)

Alex M. Lee
- Born: Alex M. Lee; 1982 (age 43–44); Seoul, South Korea
- Education: School of the Art Institute of Chicago
- Known for: 3D animation, new media art, interactive art, virtual reality
- Notable work: Project H.E.A.R.T., Everything From Here to Infinity
- Movement: electronic art, animation, new media art
- Website: https://alexmlee.com/

Alex M. Lee (born 1982) is an American and South Korean artist who lives and works in Phoenix, Arizona. He is associate professor of animation at Arizona State University's Herberger Institute for Design & Art and faculty affiliate at ASU's Mesa City Media and Immersive eXperience Center (MIX). His work uses 3D animation, game engines and virtual reality to explore temporality, language, perception and human interpretation in our technological society. His work has been presented at the Goethe Institut, SIGGRAPH, Toronto Digifest, anti-utopias amongst other international venues.

== Background ==
Lee was born in Seoul, South Korea in 1982 and grew up in America. He did his undergraduate and graduate degrees at The School of the Art Institute of Chicago, pursuing photography and digital imaging in the former and then Art & Technology in the latter.

== Career ==
=== Machinic Vision, Selected Works: 2008-2010 ===
Lee's series, Machinic Vision, was featured in the anthology and textbook, "Reframing Photography: theory and practice". In a documentary video for the release of the textbook, Lee was invited to provide an overview of his series of his early works, which "...emancipates the image from real-world capture by rendering digital images exclusively with computer technology." according to Routledge.

=== The Sands (2017) ===
In 2017, Lee was part of a VR group show called The Sands at Essex Flowers, a storefront gallery on the Lower East Side of Manhattan. Reviewed critically by HyperAllergic and Smithsonian magazine, the virtual reality works were curated around the myth of an abandoned casino lying destitute from the bygone era of Fifties Vegas glory, and showcased a 1:1 replica of Essex Flowers venue with embedded digital artworks.

=== Everything from Here To Infinity (2017) ===
“Everything from Here to Infinity” is an immersive virtual reality piece viewed on the Oculus headset, where Lee processes data of celestial objects from the Sloan Digital Sky Survey (SDSS) and re-renders them in a complex spatial universe of abstract expressionist paint strokes. It was most recently debuted at Digifest Toronto

=== Project H.E.A.R.T. (2018) ===
In 2018 Lee collaborated with new media artist Erin Gee (artist) to produce an artistic video game, Project H.E.A.R.T. ("Holographic Empathy Attack Robots Team"). It is presented as an installation on a desktop computer with an oculus headset and a biosensor on the user's hand. The sensor would measure changes in their skin conductance and heart rate as they played the video game. Users are challenged to use their focus and empathy to support in-game soldiers' morale in order to win, as opposed to enacting the typical violence in first-person shooter video games.

=== the Fold: Episode I (2020) ===
In 2022, Lee debuted his multi-episodic VR project, the Fold. It is a non-linear interactive film and VR-based art game involving rooms with doors containing a concept folding into other rooms with doors. Inspired by Jorge Luis Borges' short story 'The Garden of Forking Paths', it is in the spirit of an 'escape the room' concept which highlights the similarities and differences of technics as it relates to Western and Eastern philosophy. Episode I debuted at the Paris/Berlin Recontres Internationales in Paris and Berlin in 2022 after multiple delays and postponements due to the COVID-19 epidemic.
