= Pat Lee =

Pat Lee is the name of:

- Pat Lee (comics) (born 1975), Canadian comic book artist
- Pat Lee (politician) (born 1944), former Irish Fine Gael politician from Dublin
- Pat Lee (American football) (born 1984), American football cornerback

== See also ==
- Patrick Lee (disambiguation)
