= Lee Johnson =

Lee Johnson may refer to:

== Sportspeople ==
- Lee Johnson (wide receiver) (born 1944), American football wide receiver
- Lee Johnson (punter) (born 1961), American football punter
- Lee Johnson (basketball) (born 1957), American basketball player
- Lee Johnson (lineman), arena football player and coach
- Lee Johnson (football coach) (born 1980), English football coach
- Lee Johnson (footballer) (born 1981), English footballer and manager
- Lee Johnson (wrestler) (born 1997), American professional wrestler signed to All Elite Wrestling

== Others ==
- Lee Johnson (Oregon judge) (1930–2009), American politician
- Lee A. Johnson (born 1947), American Kansas Supreme Court Justice
- Lee Johnson (art historian) (1924–2006)
- Lee Johnson (politician), American politician from Arkansas
- Dewayne "Lee" Johnson, plaintiff in Johnson v. Monsanto Co.

== See also ==
- Lee Johnston (disambiguation)
