= Lee Evans =

Lee Evans may refer to:

== Sports ==
- Lee Evans (American football) (born 1981), American football player
- Lee Evans (darts player) (born 1988), British dart player
- Lee Evans (footballer) (born 1994), Welsh association football player
- Lee Evans (sprinter) (1947–2021), American sprinter

== Others ==
- Lee Evans (comedian) (born 1964), English comedian and actor
- Lee Evans (Australian politician) (born 1961), Australian politician
- Lee Evans (Georgia politician), president of the Atlanta Board of Aldermen
- Lee G. R. Evans (born 1960), British birdwatcher
- Lee Sunday Evans, American theatre director and choreographer
- Lee Latchford-Evans (born 1975), musician and former member of the band Steps
