= Lee King =

Lee King may refer to:

- Lee King (outfielder) (1892–1967), American professional baseball outfielder
- Lee King (utility player) (1894–1938), American professional baseball utility player
