= Lee Minto =

American women's health activist

- Born: October 11, 1927 (age 99); Hamilton, Montana
- Education: University of Montana, University of Washington
- Occupations: Women's health activist and sex education advocate
- Known for: Organizing and promoting Washington State Referendum 20, which successfully legalized early pregnancy abortion in Washington in 1970.
- Title: Executive Director for Seattle-King County Planned Parenthood
- Spouse: Robert Minto

Lee Minto (born 1927) is an American women's health activist and sex education advocate. She served as executive director of the Seattle-King County chapter of Planned Parenthood for 27 years, and was instrumental in Washington State Referendum 20, a referendum in 1970 that successfully legalized early pregnancy abortion in the state of Washington.

== Early life and education ==
Minto was born October 11, 1927, in Hamilton, Montana. Her grandparents had moved to Montana from Virginia in 1890; Minto's grandfather was the personal attorney of "Copper King" Marcus Daly and had helped form Montana's first legislature.

Minto met her husband, B-29 pilot Robert Minto, during her sophomore year at the University of Montana, and they married three months later. The couple moved to Washington soon after their marriage, and Minto finished her education at the University of Washington. They had three children – two daughters and a son.

== Career ==
Minto's first paid position was a job at the UN Pavilion at Seattle's World Fair in 1962.

=== Planned Parenthood ===
In the late 1950s, a friend had asked Minto to join the local Seattle-King County board of Planned Parenthood. Concerned by the lack of practical sex education in schools, and by the absence of birth control and women's health issues in media coverage, Minto began teaching sex education in schools and giving speeches locally in her role as a Planned Parenthood volunteer. She developed a sex education association for King County.

The Seattle-King County Planned Parenthood had been largely run by volunteers up to this point, but in 1967 the organization wanted to expand its services into other parts of Washington, and Minto was hired as the full-time executive director.

==== Washington State Referendum 20 ====
In 1967, Washington psychologist Sam Goldenberg organized a meeting of medical, legal and religious professionals to discuss the health crisis created by lack of access to safe abortions, and Minto was invited to attend. Aside from her work at Planned Parenthood, Minto was already aware of the need for safe abortions through administrative work at the University Unitarian Church, where she had encountered young pregnant women – and their male partners – searching for assistance. Sam Goldenberg's group continued its discussions and debates, formally becoming the Citizens' Abortion Study Group (later renamed the Washington Citizens for Abortion Reform). Despite being supportive of a woman's right to choose, Minto later recalled that the group was primarily focused on the healthcare issues involved:

Those of us who worked on this, I guess it would be fair to say we were less concerned about women's rights than women's health. The medical people who were involved had all had direct experience with the very harmful effects of back alley abortions.

The group concluded that the state needed to legalize abortions, and they subsequently drafted a bill to submit to legislature. Despite the endorsement of the bill by dozens of groups, including the Washington State Medical Association and the Washington Citizens' Committee on Crime, and the support of Republican Governor Dan Evans, the bill was not passed by legislators.

Minto and the others decided to pursue a state referendum instead, seeking support from individuals and organizations all over Washington, and Minto gave over 100 public speeches and presentations leading up to the referendum. They received endorsements from over 62 organizations such as the Washington State Bar Association, the State Council of Churches, the Washington State PTA, the Washington Environmental Council and the International Ladies Garment Workers Union.

When the referendum took place on November 3, 1970, Washington voters approved state legalization of abortion – with certain conditions attached – passing it with 56.5 per cent of the votes. Washington was the first U.S. state to legalize abortion through a vote of the people.

After the referendum, Minto worked to further improve abortion accessibility, working with organizations such as the University of Washington YWCA branch to compile lists of medical doctors who were available to help women seeking an abortion.

==== 1980s ====
During the 1980s, Minto initiated discussions with Seattle Archbishop Raymond G. Hunthausen, trying to find common ground between her organization and the Catholic Church; although the discussions were ultimately unsuccessful, Seattle stood as one of the only U.S. cities in which the Catholic Church entered into serious talks with Planned Parenthood.

==== 1990s ====
In 1991, Minto appeared before the Senate Committee on Labor and Human Resources to denounce new Title X regulations introduced in 1988 that prevented family planning clinics from giving any information about abortions to patients. Speaking as part of a panel alongside Senator Rhoda E. Perry and Beth Quill, director of ambulatory services of the Women and Infants Hospital of Rhode Island, Minto argued that family planning clinics could not provide effective healthcare services without the freedom to properly inform their patients of all options:

Family planning is all about planned and wanted children, and I really want to make this statement because I care a lot about that. It's about healthy mothers rearing healthy children ... Family planning is about having the information you need before you make decisions. It's about taking control of your own life and being responsible for your own body ... I've lived too long to think we can ever solve all the problems of women's healthcare – it's a moving target – but we can and we've got to look beyond the blinders of our own experience, our own religious beliefs, our own upbringing, sometimes our own cherished values, and see and appreciate the differing realities of other peoples' lives.

== Retirement ==
In 1993, after serving as executive director for 27 years, Minto retired from Planned Parenthood. She joined the Brush Foundation board of directors, which she chaired for three years before finally stepping down at the age of 80.
