= Lee Jeong-eun =

Lee Jeong-eun or Lee Jung-eun (Korean: 이정은) is the name of the following people:

- A series of South Korean golfers, all of them have been numbered in order of age:

- Lee Jeong-eun (golfer, born 1976) (Korean: 이정은; Hanja: 李姃垠), also known as 'Jeongeun Lee1'
- Lee Jeong-eun (golfer, born 1977) (Korean: 이정은; Hanja: 李定垠), also known as 'Jeongeun Lee2'
- Lee Jeong-eun (golfer, born 1985) (Korean: 이정은; Hanja: 李廷恩), also known as 'Jeongeun Lee3'
- Lee Jeong-eun (golfer, born 1987) (Korean: 이정은; Hanja: 李定殷), also known as 'Jeongeun Lee4'
- Lee Jeong-eun (golfer, born 1988), also known as 'Jeongeun Lee5'
- Lee Jeong-eun (golfer, born 1996), also known as 'Jeongeun Lee6'

- Lee Jeong-eun (racewalker) (born 1994), South Korean racewalker
- Lee Jung-eun (actress) (born 1970), South Korean actress
- Lee Jung-eun (judoka) (born 1988), South Korean judoka
- Lee Jung-eun (sport shooter) (born 1987), South Korean sport shooter
