= Lee C. Camp =

American theologian

- Born: Alabama
- Occupations: Theologian, academic, author and producer

Academic background
- Education: BA., Computer Science; MA., Doctrinal and Historical Studies; MDiv; MA., Christian Ethics/Moral Theology; PhD., Christian Ethics/Moral Theology
- Alma mater: Lipscomb University; Abilene Christian University; University of Notre Dame
- Website: leeccamp.com

Lee C. Camp is an American theologian, academic, author, and producer who holds the title of Distinguished Faculty Fellow at Lipscomb University, and hosts the podcast and public radio series No Small Endeavor.

Camp's work focuses on Christian ethics, nonviolence, human flourishing, and the intersection of faith and politics, addressing discipleship, justice, and religious and political allegiance. His publications comprise research articles and books, including Mere Discipleship: Radical Christianity in a Rebellious World, Who Is My Enemy? Questions American Christians Must Face About Islam, and Themselves, and Scandalous Witness: A Little Political Manifesto for Christians. Mere Discipleship was named a best book of 2011, and Scandalous Witness a best book of 2020, by the Englewood Review of Books.

== Education ==
Born in Alabama, Camp graduated with a BA in Computer Science from Lipscomb University in 1989 before shifting his focus to theology. He earned an MA in Doctrinal and Historical Studies and an MDiv from Abilene Christian University in 1993. He then pursued graduate studies at the University of Notre Dame, receiving an M.A. in Christian Ethics and Moral Theology in 1997 and a Ph.D. in 1999.

== Career ==
Camp began his academic career as an instructor in New Testament Studies at the Kenya Christian Institute of Practical Ministry and the Kenya Christian Industrial and Technological Institute in 1994. Since 1999, he has been a faculty member at Lipscomb University, teaching theology and ethics at both undergraduate and graduate levels. He was a senior faculty fellow at the Center for International Peace and Justice from 1999 to 2005. Camp holds the title for Distinguished Faculty Fellow with the Center for Vocational Discovery at Lipscomb University.

Camp is the creator, host, and executive producer of No Small Endeavor, formerly Tokens Show, a live, staged program launched in 2008. The show has been broadcast on radio and public television. The project later expanded into a podcast and, subsequently, a public radio show that was syndicated by PRX in 2023. Through these platforms, he has examined topics related to faith, ethics, and human flourishing.

== Works ==
Camp has studied Christian social ethics, nonviolence, pacifism, religion, and politics, as well as virtue theories and human flourishing. His work has examined theological interpretations of scripture, critiques of war narratives, and the role of the church in fostering justice and peace. He published the book Mere Discipleship: Radical Christianity in a Rebellious World in 2003, exploring what it means to truly follow Christ. Brinton L. Rutherford described it as "a readable and significant twenty-first century apologetic for radical discipleship that is consistent with Anabaptist thought," though he noted that "the final chapter on evangelism felt unfinished and, as a result, the book seemed to lack a conclusion." It was called an "effective presentation" by Richard S. Watts and a "fascinating and erudite examination of 'true' Christianity" by June Sawyers. Justin Duckworth stated that while the book "succeeded in its basic aims," the "real work – that of translating this into viable practice in the contemporary world – often seemed dislocated."

In 2011, Camp authored Who Is My Enemy? Questions American Christians Must Face About Islam, and Themselves, which examined Christian and Islamic perspectives on war and peacemaking. According to Greg Garrett, this work "allows us to narrow our circle of enemies". It was characterized as "compelling" and "important" by Dan Martin. In a comparative study published in Missio Dei, John Barton contended, "while Camp recognizes pious Muslim individuals who display remarkable commitments to peace, he does not adequately address movements and schools of thought".

Camp's latest book, Scandalous Witness: A Little Political Manifesto for Christians (2020), argued that American Christianity has been distorted and called for a renewed, nonpartisan faith modeled on the life of Jesus. In a review for Dialog, Jackson Nii Sabaah Adamah praised it as "a valuable resource for lay Christians, ministers, and students of theology," and observed that "Camp's political vision compellingly calls on the American church to allow its politics to be shaped by the reality of the in-breaking Kingdom of God." He also remarked that the book "is crammed into 192 pages, leaving little room to engage diverse voices in the American church." Writing in the Toronto Journal of Theology, Jonathan Tysick described it as "revitalizing, thought provoking, and perhaps even paradigm shifting," while also noting that the book is "dense."

== Personal life ==
Camp resides in Nashville with his wife, Laura, and together they have three sons.

== Bibliography ==
=== Books ===
- Camp, Lee C. (2003). Mere Discipleship: Radical Christianity in a Rebellious World. Brazos Press. ISBN 978-1587430497.
- Camp, Lee C. (2011). Who Is My Enemy? Questions American Christians Must Face About Islam, and Themselves. Brazos Press. ISBN 978-1587432880.
- Camp, Lee C. (2020). Scandalous Witness: A Little Political Manifesto for Christians. Eerdmans. ISBN 978-0802877352.

=== Selected articles ===
- Camp, L. C. (1998). "The cross in Christendom: Constantinianism and the doctrine of the atonement, or, understanding Jesus' cross when". Restoration Quarterly. 40 (2): 91–108.
- Camp, L. C. (2002). "Restoration and unity in the work of John Howard Yoder". Restoration Quarterly. 44 (1): 1–14.
- Camp, L. C. (2007). "Theological ground for peaceful co-existence". Restoration Quarterly. 49 (4): 241–246.
- Camp, L. C. (2007). "The Practice of Church". Leaven. 15 (1): 5.
