= Lee Johnston =

Lee Johnston may refer to:

- Lee Johnston (bobsleigh) (born 1972), English bobsledder
- Lee Johnston (motorcyclist) (born 1989), Northern Irish motorcyclist
