= Lee Erwin =

Lee Erwin may refer to:

- Lee Erwin (writer) (1906–1972), television writer
- Lee Erwin (organist) (1908–2000), American theatre and radio organist
- Lee Erwin (footballer) (born 1994), Scottish footballer
