= Patrick Lee (painter) =

Taiwanese painter

- 李紹榮
- Born: 1948 (age 77–78); Kaohsiung, Taiwan
- Occupation: Painter

Patrick Lee (Chinese: 李紹榮; pinyin: Lǐ Shàoróng; Pe̍h-ōe-jī: Lí Siāu-êng; born 1948) is a contemporary Taiwanese painter.

He was born in Kaohsiung City, started to paint after winning a primary school drawing contest, and is a self-taught artist. His works are multimedia on canvas or wood panels, mixing oil and acrylic paints, inks and powders. The works, primarily lavis, have recently taken a more adventurous turn and combine Chinese arts and calligraphy to modern media and contexts. Lee's works are bright and colorful panels with a lot of silver, gold, reds and blacks, a subtle marriage of strong colors resulting in a mellow blend. The texts often visible in the background are extracted from very famous and ancient museum calligraphies of Wang Xizhi recomposed in Lee's manner.

Although Lee has painted for many years, he didn't hold any shows until 2002. His first show in Taiwan was followed by a solo exhibition in Copenhagen, Denmark and several solo exhibitions in Taiwan. Exhibitions are planned for Peking and Shanghai.

He has been praised in Lifestyle Magazine and in the Taipei Times, and is particularly appreciated by Western collectors.

== Work ==
Patrick Lee is perhaps best known for his Time for a Drink collection — a series of silkscreen paintings that depict Mao Zedong and Chiang Kai-shek standing together with a bottle of Taiwan Beer between them. It is the world's first artwork upload to the Ethereum blockchain.

== See also ==
- Taiwanese art
