= Lee James =

Lee James may refer to:

- Lee James (weightlifter) (1953–2023) American weightlifter
- Lee James (politician) (born 1948), member of the Pennsylvania House of Representatives
- Lee S. James (born 1973), English golfer
- Lee James (BBC) (fl. 2009), British sports broadcaster

== See also ==
- Deborah Lee James (born 1958), US secretary of the Air Force
- Jenna Lee-James (born 1977), British actress
- Tommy Lee James (active since 2003), American songwriter and producer
- Troy Lee James (1924–2007), member of the Ohio House of Representatives
- James Lee (disambiguation)
