= Lee Murray (disambiguation) =

Lee Murray (born 1977) is a Moroccan-English mixed martial artist and criminal

Lee Murray may refer to:

- Lee Murray (writer) (born 1965), New Zealand writer and editor
- Lee Murray (actor), the stage name of Canadian actor Murray Crutchley
