= Lee G. R. Evans =

British birdwatcher author (b.1960)

- Born: October 1960 (age 66); Luton, Bedfordshire, United Kingdom

Lee Evans (born October 1960) is a British birdwatcher author on rare birds and bird tour leader. He has seen 594 species of bird in Britain and Ireland; however his principal interest is British Isles yearlisting, where he aims to see over 300 species of bird in the wild in Britain and Ireland each year. He claims to have seen 386 species in Britain and Ireland in 1996, 704 species in the Western Palearctic in one calendar year, 222 species in Britain in January and 209 species in just one week.

Evans setup and runs the UK 400 Club, a group for birders interested in rare birds and twitching.

He has written 27 different books on birds, including Rare Birds in Britain 1800-1990 and a number of volumes in his Rare Birds and Scarce Migrants of... series as well as producing a large number of identification papers (such as those on white wagtails, redpolls, Hume's leaf warbler, etc.) and was instrumental in launching the Bird Information Service and its associated magazine and Birdlines.
