= Lee Rogers (American singer) =

American singer

Lee Rogers (born Roger Lee Craton, 1939 – October 1, 1990) was an American R&B singer from Detroit, Michigan, United States. Rogers is best known for "I Want You To Have Everything", which peaked at No. 17 on the US Billboard R&B chart in 1965. He later formed Gold Top Records in partnership with Mr. Bo.
