= Lee Rogers (Northern Irish singer) =

Northern Irish singer-songwriter (born 1977)

- Born: Lee Rogers; 21 February 1977 (age 49)
- Origin: Carrickfergus, Northern Ireland
- Genres: Acoustic/rock
- Years active: 22
- Label: Zenith Cafe
- Website: leerogers.co.uk

Lee Rogers (born 21 February 1977) is a Northern Irish singer-songwriter. His music is released through Zenith Cafe.

"How Will I Sleep", taken from the album Drawing Clocks, featured in the 2005 film, The River King. Rogers also co-wrote and performed the title track for the Diego Maradona movie, The Hand of God.

Rogers has gigged throughout the UK. On 16 February 2006, Rogers performed in Studio Two at Abbey Road Studios, which was broadcast live around the world in over 130 countries on UPOP on WorldSpace and XM Satellite Radio radio.

His tracks can be heard on radio stations worldwide. "Love, Love, Love", "Get It Right", and "Nevermind" are amongst the tracks of Rogers' that have been played on BBC Radio 2 by Bob Harris. Amongst many others, he has also been interviewed live, and had airplay on BBC Radio 4's "Loose Ends", and British Forces Broadcasting Service radio. Seven tracks from Drawing Clocks were added to the BBC Radio playlist. Douglas Newsom (CEO) said "you tied the recent all time record of seven songs accepted by any one artist (prior to that it was five and we have over 200 great artists)".

On 9 June 2006 Rogers appeared at NXNE festival in Canada, where reviewer Phil Villeneuve from Chart Attack rated him 99/100. He has also played at Midem.

In 2009, Rogers began work on the writing and recording of a new album. It was not until 2012 that Citizen:General was released.

On 10 April 2020, Rogers released a single "Stayin Alive", "Silent Song", and "Haunted". He announced that his new album, Gameblood, which was recorded and produced by Gareth Dunlop would be released.

Rogers married fellow tattoo artist Nikita Hegarty in 2018.

== Discography ==
=== Albums ===
- Drawing Clocks (2006)
- Lost and Found (compilation album) (2007)
- Citizen:General (2012)
- Gameblood (2020)

=== EPs ===
- "Promise of Day" (Limited Edition Demo EP)(2004)
- "Blood in Blood Out" (Limited Edition Demo EP)

=== Singles ===
- "Love, Love, Love" (2006)
- "Stayin Alive" (2020)
- "Silent Song" (2020)
- "Haunted" (2020)
- "The House" (2021)

=== Film soundtracks ===
- "How Will I Sleep" – The River King (2005)
- "Hand of God" – Maradona – The Hand of God (2007)
