= Lee Sampson =

Canadian football player (born 1939)

Profile
- Position: Halfback

Personal information
- Born: February 16, 1939 (age 87); Los Angeles, California, U.S.
- Listed height: 6 ft 4 in (1.93 m)
- Listed weight: 225 lb (102 kg)

Career history
- 1964: Toronto Argonauts
- 1965: Hamilton Tiger-Cats

Awards and highlights
- Grey Cup champion (1965)

Lee Sampson (born February 16, 1939) was an American professional football player who played for the Hamilton Tiger-Cats and Toronto Argonauts. He won the Grey Cup with the Tiger-Cats in 1965. He played college football at New Mexico State University.
