= Lee O'Connor =

Lee O'Connor may refer to:

- Lee O'Connor (comics) (born 1982), British illustrator and comics artist
- Lee O'Connor (footballer) (born 2000), Irish professional footballer
