= Lee Martin =

Lee Martin may refer to:

- Lee Martin (footballer, born February 1968), former English football left-back born in Hyde, Cheshire
- Lee Martin (footballer, born September 1968), former English football goalkeeper born in Huddersfield, West Riding of Yorkshire
- Lee Martin (footballer, born 1987), English football winger born in Taunton, Somerset
- Lee Martin (writer), American author
- Lee Martin (mystery writer) (1943–2021), pseudonym of Anne Wingate
- Lee Martin (politician) (1870–1950), New Zealand politician
- Lee Ann Martin, judge in Manitoba, Canada
- Lee Roy Martin (1937–1972), American serial killer
