= Lee Naylor =

Lee Naylor may refer to:

- Lee Naylor (footballer) (born 1980), English footballer
- Lee Naylor (sprinter) (born 1971), Australian track and field athlete
- Lee Naylor (Emmerdale), a fictional character in Emmerdale
