= Lee Robinson =

Lee Robinson is the name of:

- Lee Robinson (American football) (born 1987), American football linebacker
- Lee Robinson (footballer) (born 1986), English goalkeeper for Dunfermline Athletic
- Lee Robinson (politician) (1943–2015), American politician, former mayor of Macon, Georgia
- Lee Robinson (rugby union) (born 1980)
- Lee Robinson (director) (1923–2003), Australian director
