= Lee Patrick =

Lee Patrick may refer to:

- Lee Patrick (actress) (1901–1982), American theater and film actress
- Lee Patrick (saxophonist) (born 1938), American saxophonist and university music instructor

== See also ==
- Patrick Lee (disambiguation)
