= Denis Price =

Major-General The Reverend Denis Price CB CBE (28 October 1908 – 19 March 1966) was the principal military architect in charge of Combined Operations for Admiral Lord Louis Mountbatten, Supreme Allied Commander of South East Asia. After serving in WWII under the Supreme Allied Commander for South East Asia, Price became Head of the BSSO British Services Security Organisation, MI5's regional office for Germany. He later served as Chief of Staff, British Defence Staff in Washington from 1959 to 1962. Prior to his death, he was ordained into the Presbyterian Church in the United States.

Recent publication of classified documents held by the British Government indicate that Price and Louis Mountbatten maintained a close working relationship, partnering for decades to build a series of international intelligence networks for the British Government.

== Early life ==
Denis Walter Price was born in Kandy in Ceylon and educated at Blundell's School in Tiverton, Gonville and Caius College, Cambridge, and the Royal Military Academy in Woolwich. He was commissioned into the Royal Engineers on 31 January 1929.

== Army career ==
Price's military appointments are as follows:

- 38th Field Company (1932–34)
- Training Battalion, Chatham (1934–36)
- Employed by the Air Ministry in Iraq on survey work (1936–38)
- Company officer Royal Military College (1938–39)
- Deputy Acting Quartermaster General, Royal Marine Division (1941)
- GSOI at Combined Operations Headquarters and tour of duty in the United States (1942–1943)
- Head of Combined Operations Staff at the Headquarters, Supreme Allied Command South East Asia (1944–1945)
- Commander, 41 Indian Beach Group (1945)
- Chief Royal Engineer, 5th Indian Division and Force 110 (sent to restore order in the Dutch East Indies).
- GSOI, Military Intelligence Branch, War Office (1947)
- Brigadier, Far East Land Forces
- Commander, British Services Security Organisation (1956–1958)
- Chief of Staff, British Defence Staffs in Washington (1959–1962)

Price was created Commander of the Most Excellent Order of the British Empire in 1945 and Companion of the Most Honourable Order of the Bath in 1961.

== British Services Security Organisation ==
Denis Price was the first Head of the British Services Security Organisation (BSSO), a division of MI5.

The BSSO originated in March 1954 as the new name for the existing British Forces Security Unit.

In 1959, the Joint Intelligence Committee sought to reduce the cost of running BSSO. MI5 recommended an internal restructuring and a bigger role for itself. BSSO subsequently acquired a civilian rather than a military head for the first time. Staff numbers were reduced from 480 to 322 and some duties were passed to the German intelligence services. The Americans took over funding of the BSSO comint station at Hanover.

In 1961, BSSO came under command of the C-in-C Germany, downgrading the priority of tasks from London.

== Ministry ==
On leaving the army Price moved to United States and after a course of studies was ordained into the Presbyterian Church. His studies were interrupted by the illness from which he later died, but in spite of this he served as a pastor at High Bridge Presbyterian Church in Natural Bridge, Virginia for the two years before his death. His funeral was held at High Bridge Presbyterian Church.

In 1951, Price married Audrey de Beaufort, and they had two sons and two daughters.

== Sources ==
- Obituary of Maj-Gen. D. W. Price, The Times, 23 March 1966 (pg. 14; Issue 56587; col F)
- Copy of a letter from [Lord Louis Mountbatten] to Major General R.E.Laycock informing him that a party has been sent from SEAC to Britain for Operation Overlord, 2 May 1944. Broadlands archives. MS62/MB/1/C/51/19. University of Southampton Special Collections, University of Southampton, University Road, Southampton, SO17 1BJ.
