= Lee W. Fulton =

United States Air Force general

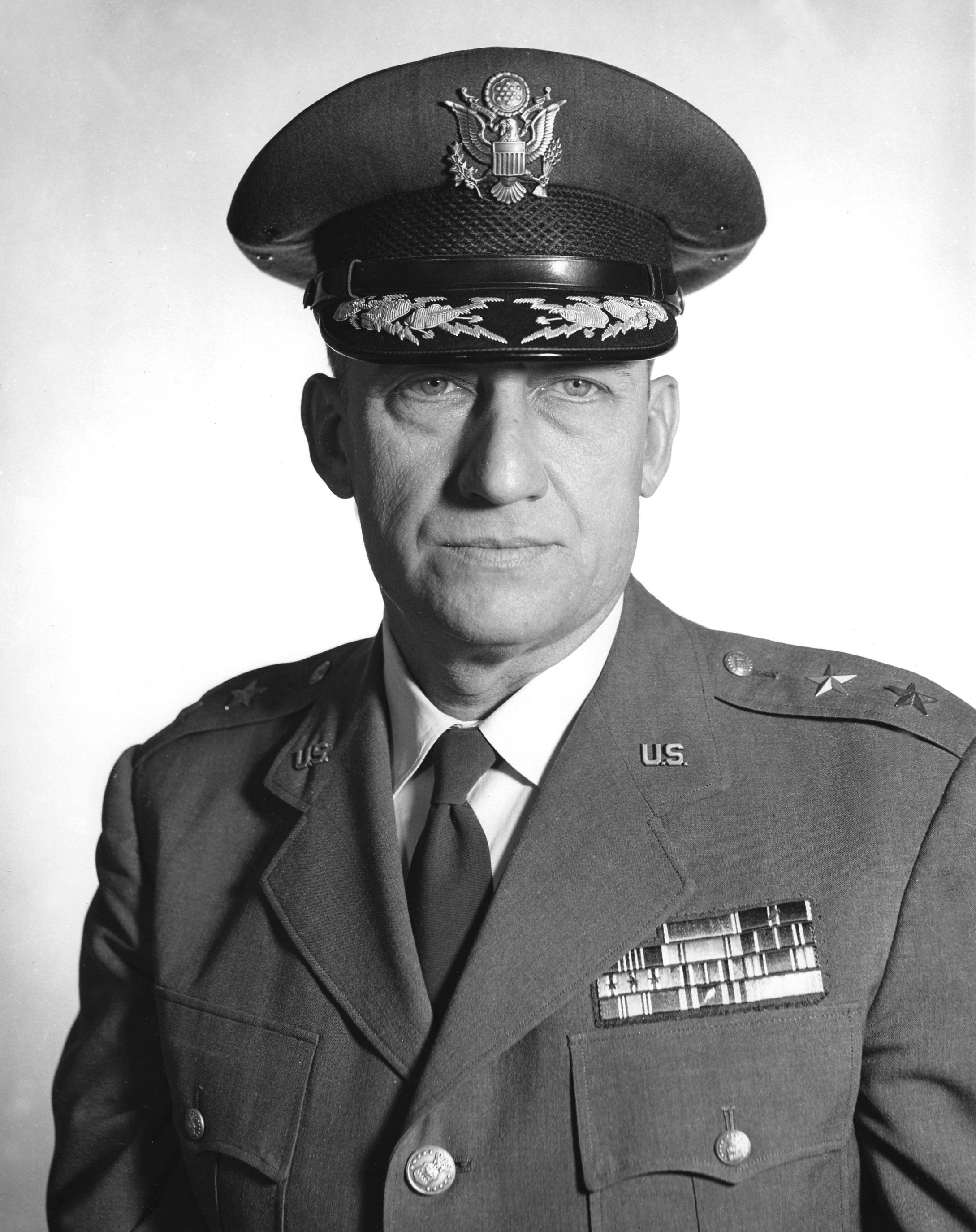
- Born: May 30, 1910; Morgan County, Illinois
- Died: October 29, 1976 (aged 66)
- Military career
- Allegiance: United States of America
- Branch: United States Air Force
- Rank: Major General

Lee W. Fulton (May 30, 1910 – October 29, 1976) was a major general in the United States Air Force.

Fulton was born in Morgan County, Illinois in 1910.

Fulton originally enlisted in the Oklahoma Army National Guard as a private in 1927. In 1930, he was commissioned a second lieutenant. In 1934, he was assigned to the Civilian Conservation Corps. He would go on to command CCC companies in Illinois, Wisconsin, Washington, and Idaho.

Later, he transferred to the United States Army Air Corps and was commissioned a first lieutenant in 1940. In 1942, Major Fulton took command of the 51st Air Service Center in the Assam Valley of India and was responsible for supporting the airlift of supplies over "The Hump" (the Himalayan mountains) into China. During the later part of World War II, Colonel Fulton served with the 315th Bombardment Wing as chief of maintenance. Later in his career, he was assigned to Air Force Logistics Command. His retirement was effective as of August 1, 1965. Awards he received include the Legion of Merit and the Bronze Star Medal.

He died on October 29, 1976.
