= Ernest Albert Garlington =

US Army general and Medal of Honor recipient (1854–1934)

Ernest A. Garlington
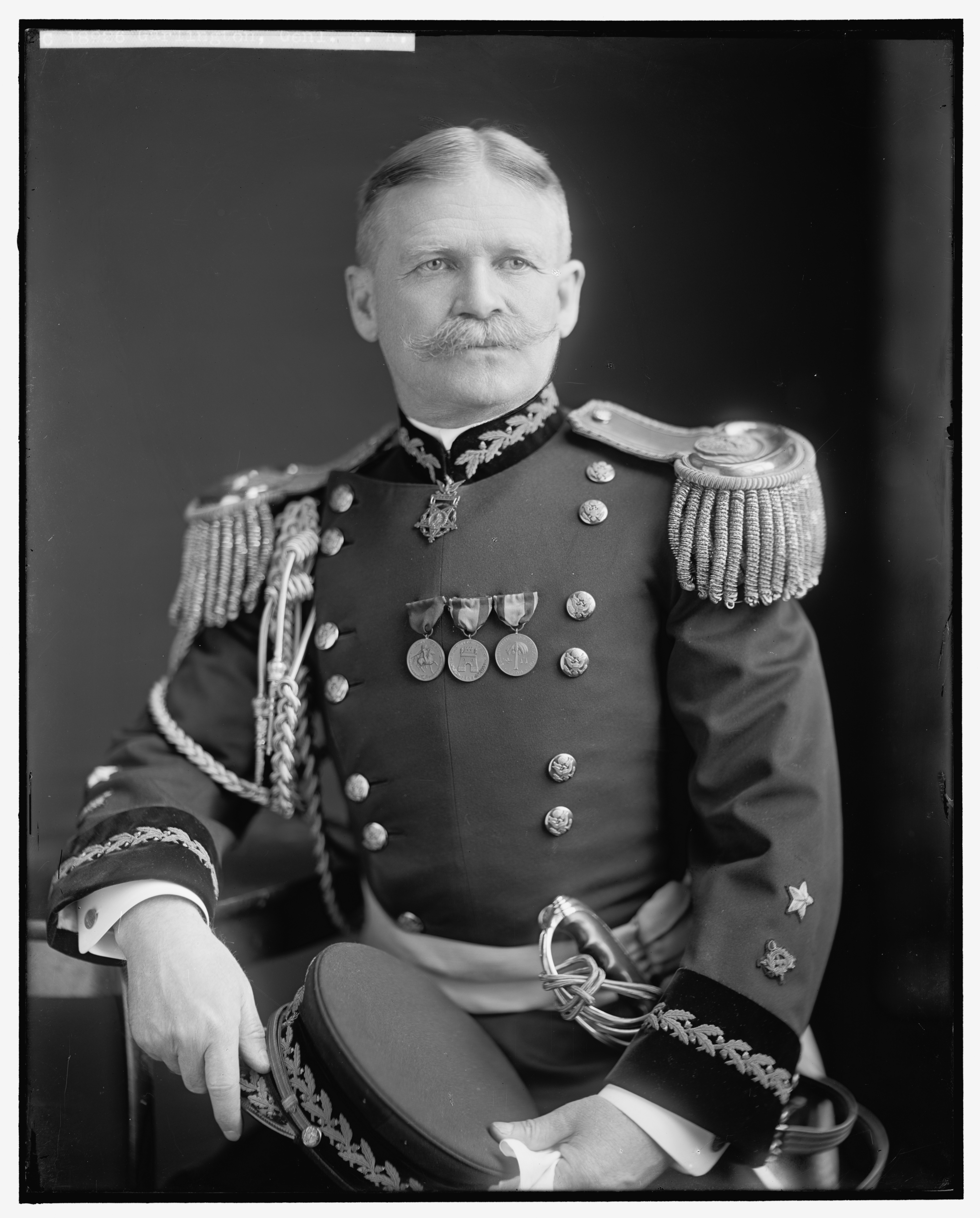
- Born: February 20, 1853; Newberry, South Carolina, US
- Died: October 16, 1934 (aged 81); San Diego, California, US
- Burial place: Arlington National Cemetery
- Military career
- Allegiance: United States of America
- Branch: United States Army
- Service years: 1876–1917
- Rank: Brigadier General
- Service number: 0-13110
- Unit: 7th Cavalry Regiment
- Conflicts: American Indian Wars; Wounded Knee Massacre; Spanish–American War; Philippine–American War
- Awards: Medal of Honor
- Other work: Inspector General of the Army; member, General Staff of the Army (1906-17)

Ernest Albert Garlington (February 20, 1853 – October 16, 1934) was a United States Army general who received the Medal of Honor for his participation in the Wounded Knee Massacre during the Indian Wars.

== Early life and education ==
Garlington was born in Newberry, South Carolina to Albert Creswell Garlington, a general in the South Carolina militia during the American Civil War. He entered the University of Georgia (UGA) in Athens in 1869; however, he left UGA before graduating to accept an appointment to the United States Military Academy. He graduated from the academy in 1876 and was commissioned on June 15 of that year as a second lieutenant in the 7th Regiment of the United States Cavalry; because academy graduates were granted extended leave after graduation, the Battle of the Little Big Horn occurred after his appointment but before he joined the unit.

== Early military career ==
Due to his regiment's heavy losses, Garlington was quickly promoted to first lieutenant on June 25, 1876, and then to Regimental Adjutant June 6, 1877, and served in that post until 1881. He commanded one of the failed Adolphus Greely Relief Expeditions in 1883.

On December 29, 1890, Garlington was injured while at Wounded Knee Massacre in South Dakota, and received the Medal of Honor on September 23, 1893, for distinguished gallantry.

Garlington's next promotions were to captain on December 3, 1891, and major, inspector general, on January 2, 1895. In 1898, Garlington served as inspector general in Cuba during the Spanish–American War and participated in the Battle of Santiago de Cuba. In that same year (July 7, 1898), he was promoted to lieutenant colonel. He again served as inspector general from 1899 through 1901 in the Philippines during the Philippine–American War. On March 1, 1901, Garlington was promoted to colonel. He served in the inspector general position again in the Philippines from 1905 to 1906.

The ultimate promotion for Garlington was to brigadier general, Inspector General of the Army, on October 1, 1906, after which he served on the General Staff of the Army. In 1908, he conducted the army investigation into the Brownsville Affair.

In 1911, he was an observer of the German Army Maneuvers.

== World War I ==
He retired due to age on February 20, 1917. However, he served in the office of the chief of staff from April 30 to September 21, 1917.

== Death and legacy ==
Garlington died on October 16, 1934 and was buried at Arlington National Cemetery, Arlington, Virginia. His first wife, Anna Buford Garlington (1864–1954) and his daughter, Sally Garlington Chamberlin (1890–1949), are buried with him. His son, Cresswell Garlington, (1887–1945) was also a brigadier general in the United States Army and is buried in a separate plot at Arlington.

Books written by Garlington include: Historical Sketches of the Seventh Cavalry Regiment and A Catechism on Cavalry Outposts, Reconnaissance, Patrols, and Advance and Rear Guards.

== Awards ==
- Medal of Honor
- Indian Campaign Medal
- Spanish Campaign Medal
- Philippine Campaign Medal
- Victory Medal

=== Medal of Honor citation ===
Rank and organization: first lieutenant, 7th U.S. Cavalry. Place and date: At Wounded Knee Creek, S. Dak., December 29, 1890. Entered service at: Athens, Ga. Born: February 20, 1853, Newberry, S.C. Date of issue: September 26, 1893.

Citation:

Distinguished gallantry.

== Controversy ==
Mass Grave for the Dead Lakota After the Engagement at Wounded Knee

There have been several attempts to rescind the Medals of Honor awarded in connection with the Wounded Knee Massacre. Proponents claim that the engagement was a massacre, not a battle, due to the high number of killed and wounded Lakota women and children and the very one-sided casualty counts. Estimates of the Lakota losses indicate 150–300 killed, of which up to 200 were women and children. Additionally, as many as 51 were wounded. In contrast, the 7th Cavalry suffered 25 killed and 39 wounded, many being the result of friendly fire.

Calvin Spotted Elk, direct descendant of Chief Spotted Elk killed at Wounded Knee, launched a petition to rescind medals from the soldiers who participated in the battle.

The Army has also been criticized more generally for the seemingly disproportionate number of Medals of Honor awarded in connection with the battle. For comparison, 19 Medals were awarded at Wounded Knee, 21 at the Battle of Cedar Creek, and 20 at the Battle of Antietam. Respectively, Cedar Creek and Antietam involved 52,712 and 113,000 troops, suffering 8,674 and 22,717 casualties. Wounded Knee, however, involved 610 combatants and resulted in as many as 705 casualties (including non-combatants).

== See also ==
- List of Medal of Honor recipients
- List of Medal of Honor recipients for the Indian Wars
- Adolphus Greely
- Brownsville Affair

== Sources ==
- "Account of Garlington's Rescue Attempt of the Greely Expedition". Archived from the original on October 22, 2016.
- "History of the University of Georgia, Thomas Walter Reed, Imprint: Athens, Georgia: University of Georgia, ca. 1949, p. 943".
- Hamilton, Anita (3 July 2006). "A Step Back for Blacks". Time.

Military offices
| Preceded by George H. Burton | Inspector General of the U. S. Army; October 1, 1906 – February 20, 1917 | Succeeded by John L. Chamberlain |
