= Lee Alexander =

Lee Alexander may refer to:

- Lee Alexander (musician), American bassist, songwriter and music producer
- Lee Alexander (politician) (1927–1996), American politician; mayor of Syracuse, New York
- Lee Alexander McQueen, the legal and given birth name of fashion designer Alexander McQueen
- Lee Gibson (née Lee Helen Alexander; born 1991), Scottish footballer

== See also ==
- Leigh Alexander (1898–1943), soldier
- Leigh Alexander (journalist) (born 1980/1), journalist
- Alexander (surname)
