= Lee Price =

United States Army general

N. Lee S. Price
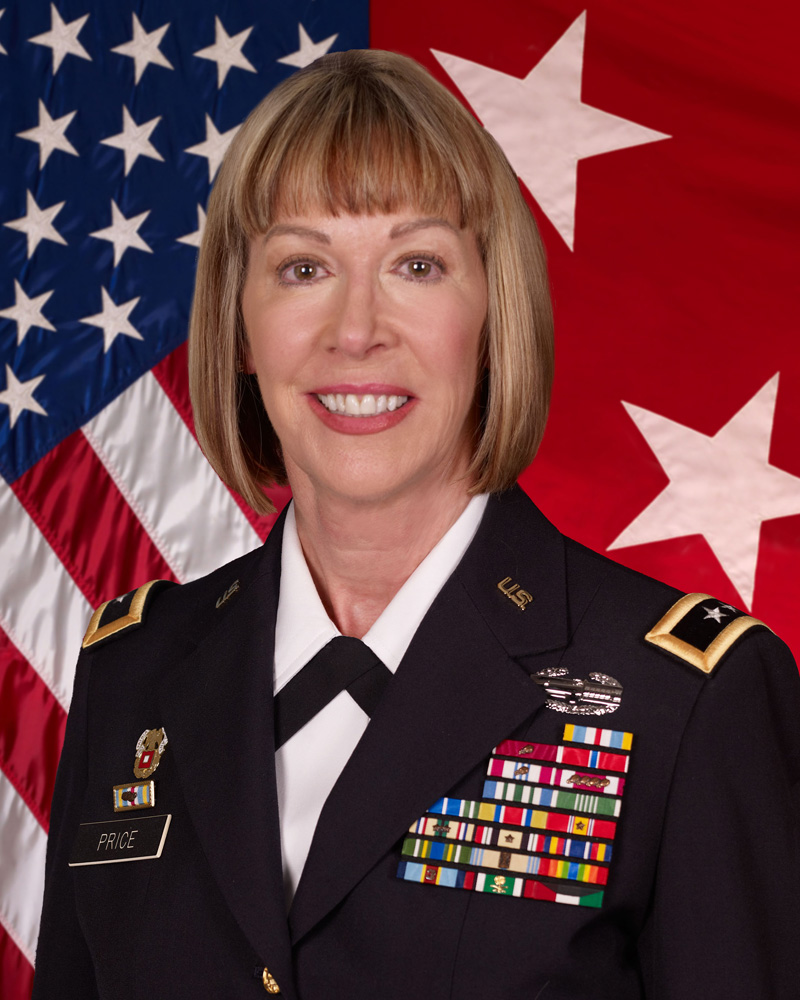
- Military career
- Allegiance: United States
- Branch: United States Army
- Service years: 1975–2014
- Rank: Major General
- Commands: Program Executive Office, Command Control Communications-Tactical
- Conflicts: Gulf War; Iraq War
- Awards: Army Distinguished Service Medal; Defense Superior Service Medal; Legion of Merit (2); Bronze Star Medal

N. Lee S. Price is a retired United States Army officer who last served as the Program Executive Officer for the United States Army's Program Executive Office, Command Control Communications-Tactical (PEO C3T), headquartered at Aberdeen Proving Ground.

Price began her service as a Private First Class and, after shattering numerous gender ceilings, ultimately retired as a Major General. She led organizations at all levels during her storied career. She was the first female to receive a commission through the Officer Candidate School to achieve the rank of General Officer. In November 2008, Price became the first woman in the Army Acquisition Corps to be promoted to the rank of brigadier general. She also was the first woman selected for general officer rank while serving in a special operations unit. Price was nominated by President Barack Obama to the grade of major general on July 27, 2011. The Senate confirmed this nomination on November 10, 2011. Price became the first female Program Executive Officer for the Army in November 2009 when she became the PEO for C3T. Price retired from military service in March 2014.

== Early life and education ==
Price attended the Shades Valley High School in Birmingham, Alabama, and earned her Bachelor of Science degree from the University of Alabama at Birmingham. In 2014, Price became just the 24th person named a UAB Distinguished Alumna. She also earned a master's degree in information systems, from the University of Arizona, a master's degree in communications (with focus on Organizational Leadership) from the University of Alabama, and another master's degree, from the Industrial College of the Armed Forces in Washington, D.C.

== Career ==
Price began her military career in 1975 as a private first class in the Alabama National Guard. She was commissioned through Officer Candidate School (Alabama Military Academy) in the third class that allowed women. She entered active duty in October 1981. Price has a Bachelor of Science degree from the University of Alabama at Birmingham and master's degrees from the University of Arizona, the University of Alabama, and the Industrial College of the Armed Forces in Washington, D.C.

As the United States Army's first female Program Executive Officer (PEO), Price guided the Program Executive Office, Command Control Communications-Tactical (C3T) workforce of more than 1,800 personnel who execute an annual budget of $4 billion. The dedicated PEO C3T team works by the Warfighter's side in training and combat theater locations throughout the world. They acquire, sustain and support the networked mission command solutions that bring technological dominance to present and future Warfighters. Within one year of Price's tenure, which began in November 2009, PEO C3T was awarded the David Packard award, the Department of Defense acquisition community's highest award.

In 2004, Price was the first female to be recognized as its Army Acquisition Excellence Project Manager (PM) of the Year Award as PM Defense Communications and Army Transmission Systems (DCATS). As PM DCATS, she managed programs valued at more than $2 billion. One was a $300 million project to build a commercial communications network in Iraq, Afghanistan and Kuwait. With this came the fielding of the first Very Small Aperture Satellite Terminals to combat service support troops and an effort that more than quadrupled deliveries of Land Mobile Radio systems to numerous Department of Defense forces and government agencies. During her subsequent three-year tenure as the Deputy Acquisition Executive for the United States Special Operations Command (USSOCOM), Price was responsible for providing more than $3 billion per year of specialized equipment for service-wide National and Theater Special Operators. The USSOCOM acquisitions focused on products such as body armor, aircraft, sensors, radios, watercraft and ammunition within six months from validation to delivery.

After her retirement in 2014, Price started her own company, Price Solutions. She serves a wide variety of customers in the areas of executive coaching, IT, governance, compensation, and leadership. She sits on several boards where she also holds a leadership role. Her first book, “No Greater Honor: Lessons from my Life as a Soldier” was published November, 2020.

== Awards and decorations ==
Price's awards include the Army Distinguished Service Medal, Defense Superior Service Medal, the Legion of Merit (two awards), the Bronze Star Medal, the Defense Meritorious Service Medal (two awards), the Meritorious Service Medal (five awards), the Joint Meritorious Unit Award, the Iraq Campaign Medal, the Korean Defense Service Medal, the Army Staff Badge and the Combat Action Badge. In 2009, Price was inducted into the Alabama Business and Professional Women's Foundation Academy of Honor.

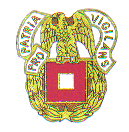
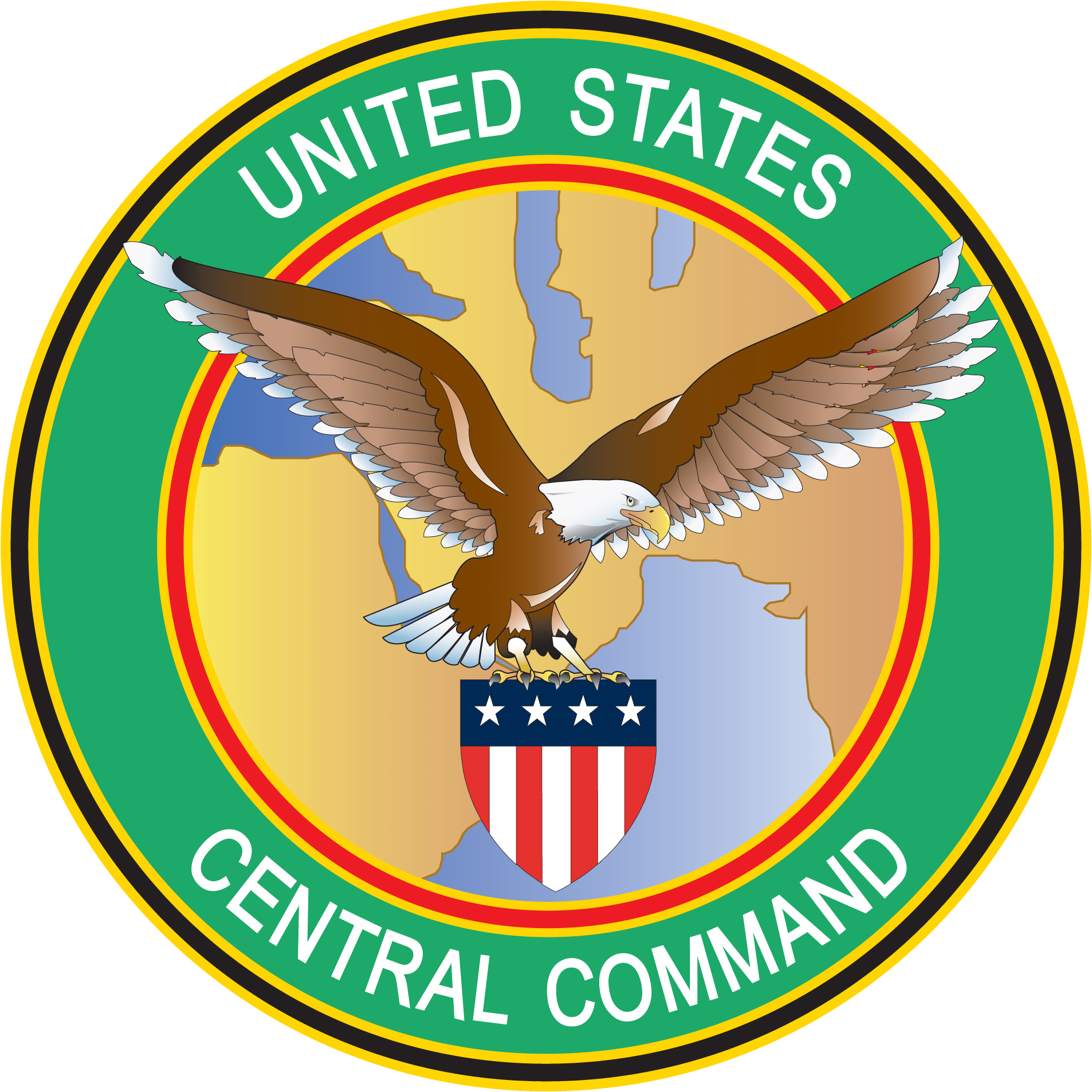
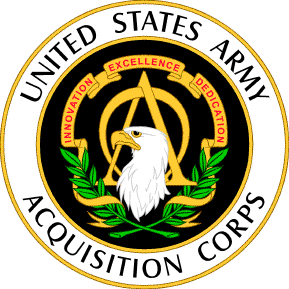
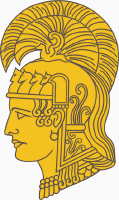
Army Distinguished Service Medal
Defense Superior Service Medal
Legion of Merit (with Oak Leaf Cluster)
Bronze Star Medal
Defense Meritorious Service Medal (with Oak Leaf Cluster)
Meritorious Service Medal (with 4 Oak Leaf Clusters)
Joint Service Commendation Medal
Army Commendation Medal
Army Achievement Medal
Joint Meritorious Unit Award
Army Reserve Components Achievement Medal
National Defense Service Medal
Southwest Asia Service Medal
Iraq Campaign Medal
Global War on Terrorism Service Medal
Korea Defense Service Medal
Armed Forces Reserve Medal
Army Service Ribbon
Army Overseas Service Ribbon (with award numeral 3)
Kuwait Liberation Medal (Saudi Arabia)
Kuwait Liberation Medal (Kuwait)
Army Staff Badge
Combat Action Badge
Signal Corps Regiment Distinctive Unit Insignia
United States Central Command Service Identification Badge
Certified Member of the U.S. Army Acquisition Corps
Former member of the Women's Army Corps, which disbanded in 1978
