= Albert Creswell Garlington =

American politician (1822–1885)

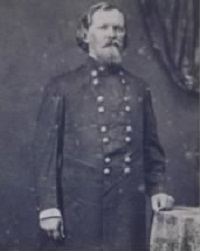
- Born: June 9, 1822; Oglethorpe County, Georgia
- Died: March 27, 1885 (aged 62); Newberry, South Carolina
- Burial place: Newberry, South Carolina
- Military career
- Allegiance: Confederate States of America
- Branch: South Carolina Militia
- Service years: 1861–1865
- Rank: Brigadier General
- Conflicts: American Civil War
- Other work: State legislator, lawyer

Albert Cresswell Garlington (June 9, 1822 – March 27, 1885) was a brigadier general in the South Carolina Militia, who served along with the Confederate States Army in South Carolina at various times during the American Civil War (Civil War). He was initially responsible for coastal defenses and militia in South Carolina, and then for training state troops. He briefly served as a major of the Holcombe Legion, a South Carolina unit guarding the coast in South Carolina for the Confederate States Army. After he resigned his commission on May 21, 1862, he served as state adjutant general and inspector general. Garlington again served as a brigadier general of militia in the Carolinas campaign of late 1864 and early 1865.

Garlington served two two-year terms in the South Carolina General Assembly in 1850–1854 before the war and a term in 1865–1867 after the war. He served as a state senator in 1856–1864. He was a director of the Greenville and Columbia Railroad and a brigadier general in the state militia before the Civil War. He was a prominent lawyer at Newberry, South Carolina, before and after the war, although he also lived for a period of time after 1867 in Atlanta, Georgia.

== Early life ==
Albert C. Garlington was born in Oglethorpe County, Georgia, on June 9, 1822. His parents were Christopher Garlington and Eliza (Aycock) Garlington. Garlington graduated from the University of Georgia with highest honors in 1842. He moved to South Carolina and became a lawyer in 1844. In 1848, he moved to his wife's home town of Newberry, South Carolina. His wife was the former Sally Lark Moon. His son, Ernest Albert Garlington, born February 20, 1853, was a graduate of the University of Georgia in 1872 and of the United States Military Academy in 1876. He was assigned to the 7th U.S. Cavalry Regiment and received the Medal of Honor for his actions at Wounded Knee. He served in the Spanish–American War and ultimately was promoted to brigadier general.

Garlington served in the South Carolina House of Representatives of the South Carolina General Assembly in 1850–1854. He lost a race for a seat in the U.S. House of Representatives to Preston Brooks in 1854. He served as a state senator in 1856–1864. He was a director of the Greenville and Columbia Railroad and a brigadier general of the 10th Brigade of the South Carolina militia before the Civil War.

== American Civil War service ==
Albert Creswell Garlington began his Civil War service as a member of South Carolina Governor Francis Pickens's council of state, assigned to the Department of the Interior. He was responsible for coastal defense and the militia. When these responsibilities were transferred to the Confederate States Army, Pickens appointed Garlington brigadier general of the 3rd Brigade of South Carolina Volunteers and Garlington began training troops. After the regiments of the brigade were mustered into the Confederate Army, on December 19, 1861, Garlington was commissioned a major in the Holcombe Legion, responsible for coastal defense. The only action in which this unit was engaged was a skirmish at Edisto Island. Garlington resigned this position on May 21, 1862. Thereafter, Governor Pickens appointed Garlington as adjutant general and inspector general of the South Carolina militia with the rank of major general.

Garlington unsuccessfully ran for governor of South Carolina in 1864.

In late 1864 and early 1865, Garlington's brigade was sent to oppose the forces of Union Major General William T. Sherman as they marched through South Carolina. Garlington's brigade evacuated the state capital of Columbia, South Carolina, upon the approach of Sherman's forces and Garlington disbanded the brigade in February 1865.

== Later life ==
After the Civil War, Albert C. Garlington was elected to a term in the South Carolina House of Representatives between 1865 and 1867. He then moved to Atlanta, Georgia, for a period of time but returned to Newberry to continue his law practice before retiring to his farm near Newberry for the last years of his life.

Albert Creswell Garlington died on March 27, 1885, in Newberry, South Carolina. He is buried in Rosemont Cemetery, Newberry, South Carolina.

== See also ==
- List of American Civil War generals (Acting Confederate)
