= Lee Garlington (actor) =

American actor and stockbroker (1937–2023)

- Born: Lee Hagan Garlington; 27 September 1937; Atlanta, Georgia, U.S.
- Died: 6 December 2023 (aged 86); Laguna Niguel, California, U.S.
- Other name: Lee H. Garglington
- Occupations: Actor; Stockbroker; Financer
- Years active: 1962–2023
- Spouse: Paul Garlington
- Partner: Rock Hudson (1962–1965)

Lee Hagan Garlington (September 27, 1937 – December 6, 2023) was an American film actor and stockbroker. He achieved posthumous media recognition for his mid-1960s secret relationship with Hollywood star Rock Hudson, who reportedly considered Garlington the primary romantic partner of his life.

== Early life ==
Garlington was born on September 27, 1937, in Atlanta, Georgia. He was raised in a traditional Southern household by his parents, Thomas Richard Garlington and Julianne Hagan, alongside an older brother, Richard. In his early adulthood during the 1960s, Garlington moved to Los Angeles to seek work within the expanding Southern California film industry, securing minor background parts and uncredited roles as a studio extra.

== Career ==
=== Hollywood career ===
In 1962, while working on the Universal Studios Lot during the production of the Western television series The Virginian, Garlington met actor Rock Hudson. Hudson subsequently invited Garlington to his home, initiating a secret three-year domestic relationship that lasted until 1965.

=== Relationship with Rock Hudson ===
Because of the social stigmas of the era and the strict commercial expectations imposed on a major Hollywood box-office draw, the couple engineered elaborate measures to maintain absolute public secrecy. Garlington regularly stayed at Hudson's Beverly Hills estate but routinely departed at 6:00 a.m., coasting his vehicle down the street with the ignition turned off to avoid waking neighbors or alerting the paparazzi. For film premieres and industry galas, the two men arrived separately and accompanied independent female companions, who functioned as "beards" to satisfy studio publicity demands.

A central event in their relationship occurred in 1963, when the couple traveled on vacation to Puerto Vallarta, Mexico—a destination recommended to them by actress Elizabeth Taylor. Due to the remote location, they lived openly as a couple free from standard press scrutiny. The relationship dissolved in 1965, with Garlington later citing his own search for a stable, parental figure that Hudson, heavily closeted and under extreme professional strain, was emotionally unequipped to provide at that stage of his life.

=== Finance ===
Following his brief time in Hollywood and his breakup with Hudson in 1965, Garlington transitioned away from the entertainment industry. He built a successful second career as a stockbroker. He worked in the financial sector for several decades, a profession he maintained long after his ties to Hollywood had faded.

=== Later years ===
Following the split, Garlington permanently retired from the film industry to establish a long-term corporate career as a stockbroker in the financial sector. He lost contact with Hudson after 1977 and learned of Hudson's 1984 AIDS diagnosis and subsequent 1985 death entirely through contemporary news broadcasts.

In 1986, journalist Sara Davidson published the authorized biography Rock Hudson: His Story. Upon reading the volume, Garlington discovered that Hudson had explicitly designated him as his "true love" alongside his mother.

== Personal life ==
The pair lived a quiet life, spending twenty years in New Zealand before eventually returning to Southern California to settle in Laguna Niguel. Garlington remained largely out of the spotlight until Hudson's death in 1985, after which he began to share his story to provide a more human perspective on the late actor's private life.

Garlington subsequently entered a long-term relationship with his partner, Paul. The couple remained together for 37 years, legally marrying following the legalization of same-sex marriage. They lived quietly in New Zealand for two decades before returning to Southern California, establishing a permanent residence in Laguna Niguel.

== Death ==
Beginning in 2015, Garlington stepped into the public spotlight to provide historical context regarding the private realities, structural challenges, and societal restrictions faced by LGBTQ+ individuals operating within classical Hollywood. He served as a primary on-screen interviewee and historical witness in the 2023 HBO documentary film Rock Hudson: All That Heaven Allowed.

Garlington died from complications related to internal bleeding and prostate cancer on December 6, 2023, at the age of 86, in Laguna Beach, California, while celebrating his 37th anniversary with his husband. He was buried in Arrowtown, New Zealand.

== Filmography ==
=== Television ===
Year	Title	Role	Notes
1962	The Virginian	Cowboy	Various Characters

=== Film ===
Year	Title	Role	Notes
2023	Rock Hudson: All That Heaven Allowed	Himself	HBO Documentary Films
