= Erin Gee (artist) =

Canadian artist

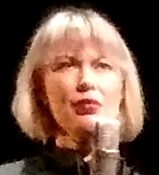
- Born: Erin Marie Gee; 1983 (age 42–43)
- Education: University of Regina, Concordia University
- Known for: composition, new media art, interactive art
- Notable work: Swarming Emotional Pianos, Project H.E.A.R.T.
- Website: https://www.eringee.net/

Erin Gee (born 1983) is a Canadian artist based in Montreal, Quebec. She is known for new media artworks and electroacoustic music composition and her art is inspired by technology and emotions, for example creating music and moving machinery inspired by recordings of heart rate and anxiety. Her works have been shown and performed internationally. Gee taught Communications as an assistant professor at Concordia University In 2018 she was an invited research associate at the University of Maine, USA in the department of chemical and biomedical engineering at University of Maine. In 2019 she began doctoral studies in music (composition and sound creation) at Université de Montréal under the direction of Dr Nicolas Bernier.

== Career ==
Gee's art includes works for performance, interactive installation, multichannel audio, robotics, video, print media, and interactive sculpture.

=== Swarming Emotional Pianos ===
As part of her work, Gee has become a self-taught robotics specialist, measuring "actors’ sweat production, heart rate, blood flow and breathing — all indicators of heightened emotions — to create the data for a computer program that transfers the data into musical notes and triggers a performance from her tubular bell-outfitted robots." This informs her work titled Swarming Emotional Pianos, which includes a video of two actors responding to vocal commands of fear, anger, joy. This work was created in collaboration with Vaughan Macefield, an Australian neurophysiologist and presented on December 13, 2014 as part of the Innovations en Concert series in Montreal, QC. The work titled Orpheux Larynx was created in collaboration with Stelarc as a vocal performance for three choral robots and human soprano singer.

=== Project H.E.A.R.T. (2017) ===
Gee also made a foray into video-game-as-art with Project H.E.A.R.T. ("Holographic Empathy Attack Robots Team"), a collaboration with Alex M. Lee. The game is presented as an installation of a desktop computer with an oculus headset and a biosensor connected to the user's hand would measure changes in their skin conductance and heart rate as they played the video game. The game hedges on challenging the user to use their focus and empathy to motivate in-game soldiers as opposed to the typical kill-to-win dynamic of first-person shooter video games.

=== to the sooe (2018) ===
Gee collaborated with Sofian Audry to create a 3D printed sound object with a human voice murmuring the words of a neural network that's trained by Emily Brontë, a deceased author. The work was further inspired by ASMR and its effects on the body. The work debuted with hexagram collective from Montreal, at Ars Electronica in 2018.

=== Education ===
Gee graduated from the University of Regina with a Bachelor of Music Education degree in 2006 and a Bachelor of Fine Arts in 2009. She graduated from Concordia University in 2014 with a Master of Fine Arts degree.

=== Exhibitions and performances ===
Year	Title	Gallery / Event	Location	Notes
2016	Vocales Digitales	Hamilton Artists' Inc	Hamilton, ON	Solo exhibition
2015	Larynx Series	Dunlop Art Gallery	Regina, SK	
2015	What Can a Vocaloid Do?	Trinity Square Video	Toronto, ON	
2015	Flesh of the World	Musée d’art Contemporain de Montreal (MACM)	Montreal, QC	
2014	Swarming Emotional Pianos v1.0	Innovations en Concert at Eastern Bloc	Montreal, QC	
2014	7 Nights of Unspeakable Truth	Epcor Centre for the Performing Arts +15	Calgary, AB	
2014	Erin Gee and Kelly Andres	Cirque du Soleil Headquarters	Montreal, QC	
2013	Et si les robots mangaient les pommes	Maison des Arts de Laval	Laval, QC	
2013	Practice Practice	Toronto Nuit Blanche	Toronto, ON	
2013	Seven Nights of Unspeakable Truth	Espace[IM]Média Festival	Sherbrooke, QC	
2012	Interactions	Leonard and Bina Ellen Gallery	Montreal, QC	
2012	Digital Interdisciplinations	Tin Sheds Gallery	Sydney, Australia	
2012	Larynx	Nuit Blanche, Art Souterrain	Montreal, QC	
2012	Voice of Echo	Gallerywest	Toronto, ON	
2011	Uncanny Sound	TACTIC	Cork, Ireland	
2011	Orpheux Larynx	Powerhouse Museum	Sydney, Australia	
2011	Live/Afterlives	La Centrale	Montreal, QC	
2011	Gen@Next	Art Gallery of Regina	Regina, SK	
2010	Post-Human//Future Tense	Arcade Gallery	Columbia College, Chicago	
2010	Lucide	Neutral Ground Art Gallery	Regina, SK	
2010	Combine	Harbourfront Centre	Toronto, ON	
2009	uCuE presents Strictement Multivoie: hear and there, then and now	Oscar Peterson Concert Hall	Montreal, QC	
2009	Mind the Gap!	Dunlop Art Gallery	Regina, SK	
2009	SoundLAB VI	FILE Electric Language International Festival	São Paulo, Brazil	
2009	Trivial Pursuits: Mass Distraction	Interaccess	Toronto, ON	
