= Lee Paje =

Filipino visual artist (born 1980)

- Born: 1980 (age 45–46)
- Education: University of the Philippines Diliman
- Known for: Painting on copper, sculpture, and video

Lee Paje is a contemporary Filipino visual artist. She has shown her works in the Philippines, Taiwan, and Singapore. Her works explore themes of women and gender identity, myth-making, and unique contemporary lifestyles. In 2018, she won the Don Papa Rum Art Competition. She has been in residency at Art Omi in New York and at Kapitana Gallery in Negros Occidental.

== Biography ==
Lee Paje was born in 1980. She graduated with a Magna Cum Laude distinction for her Bachelor of Fine Arts degree, major in Painting from the University of the Philippines Diliman, Quezon City.

== Works ==
Paje works with mediums such as painting on copper, sculpture, and video to convey visual narratives that highlight inequity in relation to gender and identity. Some of her sculptural works include Teriapara (oil on relief, 2011) and Sanctus Cunnus, choclit (liqeuer-filled chocolates, 2011) both of which are reminiscent of female genitalia. Paje's series of tondos, including Sunday Afternoon, oil and etching on copper, acrylic on steel wool (2014) and Mother and Child, oil and etching on copper, acrylic on steel wool (2014), depict everyday scenes of love and familial relationships among the LGBTQ+ community, focusing not on the unconventionality of it, but its simple relationships.

Her most recent exhibition, 'Diin, San-O, Sin-O (Where, When, Who)' at Kapitana Gallery featured works that she had produced during her two-month residency at the Kapitana Gallery, where she continued her exploration of the links between place and identity.

== Exhibitions ==
=== 2017 ===
- 'Diin, San-O, Sin-O (Where, When, Who)' at Kapitana Gallery

=== 2016 ===
- 'Unexpurgated' at Tin-aw Art Gallery

=== 2014 ===
- Art Taipei: Young Artist Discovery

=== 2013 ===
- Philippine Art Trek at Gallery Sogan & Art
- 'Bigoted' at Manila Contemporary

=== 2011 ===
- 'Mater Potestatem' at Tin-aw Art Gallery

== Features ==
- Artsy
- Art+ Magazine
- Blouin Art Info
