= The Man Outside (disambiguation) =

The Man Outside is a 1947 German play by Wolfgang Borchert.

The Man Outside may also refer to:

== Film ==
- The Man Outside (1913 film), a comedy film
- The Man Outside (1933 film), a film starring Joan Gardner
- The Man Outside (1967 film), a British film starring Van Heflin
- Man Outside, a 1986 film starring Levon Helm

== Literature ==
- "The Man Outside" (1957), a short story by Evelyn E. Smith
- The Man Outside (1975), a novel by Jane Donnelly

== Television ==
- "Man Outside", Dr. Simon Locke season 3, episode 23 (1974)
- "The Man Outside", Mannix season 5, episode 11 (1971)
- "The Man Outside", The Baron episode 28 (1967)

== See also ==
- Outside Man
