= River House =

River House may refer to:

- River House Condominiums, an apartment building in Grand Rapids, Michigan
- River House (London), an apartment building in Chelsea, London
- River House (New York City), an apartment building in Manhattan, New York
- River House (Virginia), a plantation in Virginia
- River House, York, a former club in York, in England
- River House School, a school in Warwickshire
- The River House, a former restaurant in Lancashire, England

== See also ==
- Bronx River Houses, a public housing complex in New York
- Denton House (Maryland), also known as River House, Chestertown, Maryland
- Fox River House, a hotel in Aurora, Illinois
- Harlem River Houses, a public housing complex in New York
- Las Olas River House, an apartment building in Fort Lauderdale, Florida
- McIntyre River Residence, also known as the River House, a heritage-listed house in Melbourne, Victoria, Australia
