= Ashley Hall, Lancashire =

Mansion in Lancashire, England

Ashley Hall
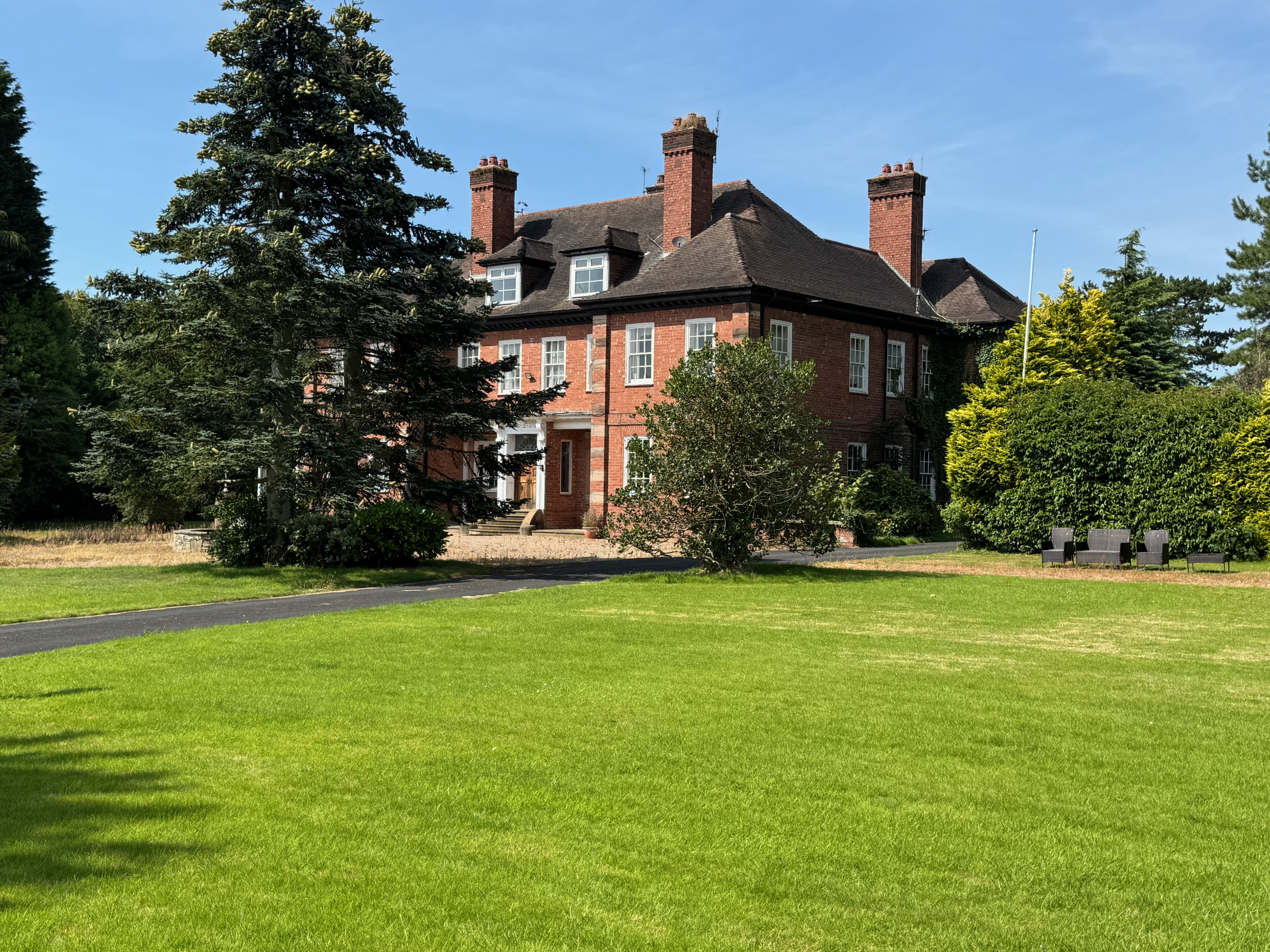
- The building in 2024, looking northwest
- Interactive map of the Ashley Hall area

General information
- Location: Skippool, Skippool Road, Thornton, Lancashire, United Kingdom
- Coordinates: 53.86291306°N 2.98481143°W
- Completed: c. 1920 (106 years ago)

Technical details
- Floor count: 3
- Floor area: 11,002 sq ft

Ashley Hall (also known as Ashley House) is a three-storey mansion in the Skippool area of Thornton, Lancashire, England. Set in around 12 acres (4.9 ha) and built in the Roaring Twenties, it was, for many years, the home for several celebrities who were appearing in Blackpool's summer shows. These include Danny La Rue, Joe Longthorne and Dorothy Squires.

The mansion has fifteen bedrooms and nine bathrooms. In its grounds are two two-bedroom cottages (known as "The Housekeepers Cottage" and "The Gardeners Cottage"), a stable block and a Dutch barn. An annex extension was built around 1980.

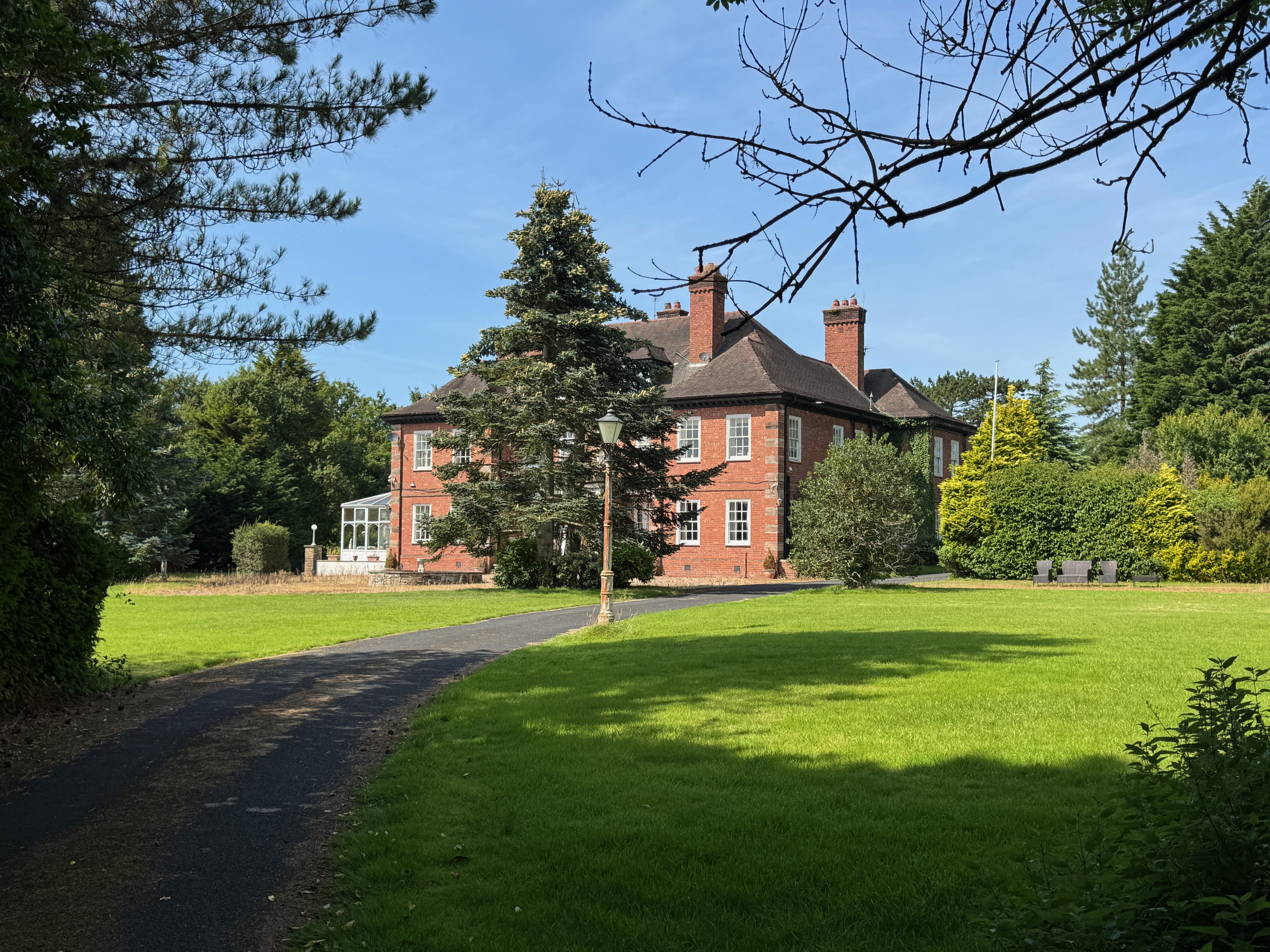
This view shows the conservatory on the building's western side

Built by T. B. Silcock, the property was owned by hotelier Len Rawcliffe from the 1970s until his death in 2021. It remains in the Rawcliffe family, but in 2022 it was put on the market for £3.75 million. Prior to that, it was owned by Mr and Mrs Percy Hawtin, who permitted the public to tour the grounds.

Ashley Hall stood across Skippool Road from another mansion, Illawalla, which was demolished in 1996.
