= Fairbrother & Hall =

20th-century British architects

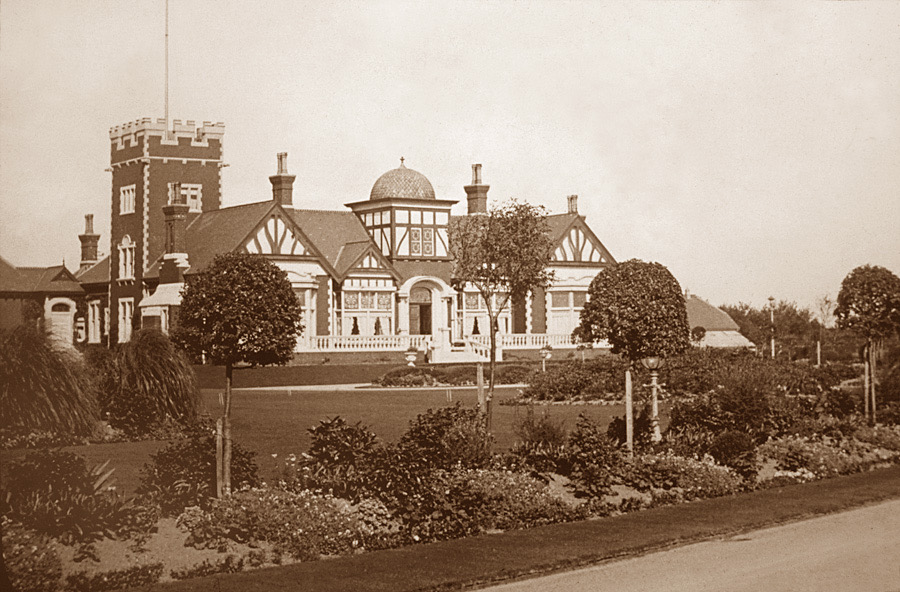
- The Illawalla, one of Fairbrother & Hall's early designs

Practice information
- Key architects: Tom Wilson Fairbrother; Charles Llewelyn Hall
- Location: Various

Significant works and honors
- Design: The Illawalla

Fairbrother & Hall was a British architectural partnership prominent in the 20th century. The individuals were Tom Wilson Fairbrother (born 1873) and Charles Llewelyn Hall.

At the turn of the 20th century, when they designed the Edwardian building The Illawalla in Lancashire, England, they were based in nearby Poulton-le-Fylde, at Bank Chambers in Market Place. It is believed they also had a practice in Edinburgh: an address in 1950 was given — by Matthew Cormie, one of their employees — as 63 Castle Street in the Scottish capital. The branch was set up by a 32-year-old Douglas Haig Bamber. Lancashire-born Bamber, formerly a major with the Royal Engineers, previously worked for the firm in the 1930s. In the August 1957 edition of Builder, the firm's address is given as having been at 27 Rutland Square in Edinburgh between 1952 and at least 1962. They appear to have kept an office on the Fylde too, for an address of 210 Norbreck Road in Little Bispham around the same time was given by Richard Pye, another employee. A partner, last name Hedges, later joined the firm.

In 1957, David Malcolm Hall became a partner. He and Bamber set up an independent practice, as Bamber & Hall, in the early 1960s, then Bamber Hall Partnership when three others joined. Bamber retired in 1975, moving to Auchterarder, Perth and Kinross, where he died in 1996 at the age of 79.

Fairbrother, Hall & Hedges moved to 9A Cedar Square in Blackpool in 1987.

== Selected works ==
A selection of buildings designed by the firm.

- The Illawalla (1902)
- The Shovels Inn, Hambleton (1953)
- The Ship Inn, Dalkeith, Edinburgh (1955)
- Trafalgar Bar, Edinburgh (1956)
- Gracemount Secondary School, Edinburgh (1957)
- St Cuthbert's Primary School, Edinburgh (1957)
- Portobello Secondary School, Edinburgh (1959)
- Gyle Pavilion, Edinburgh (1961)
