= Greenway Historic District =

Historic district in Virginia, United States

- U.S. National Register of Historic Places
- U.S. Historic district
- Virginia Landmarks Register
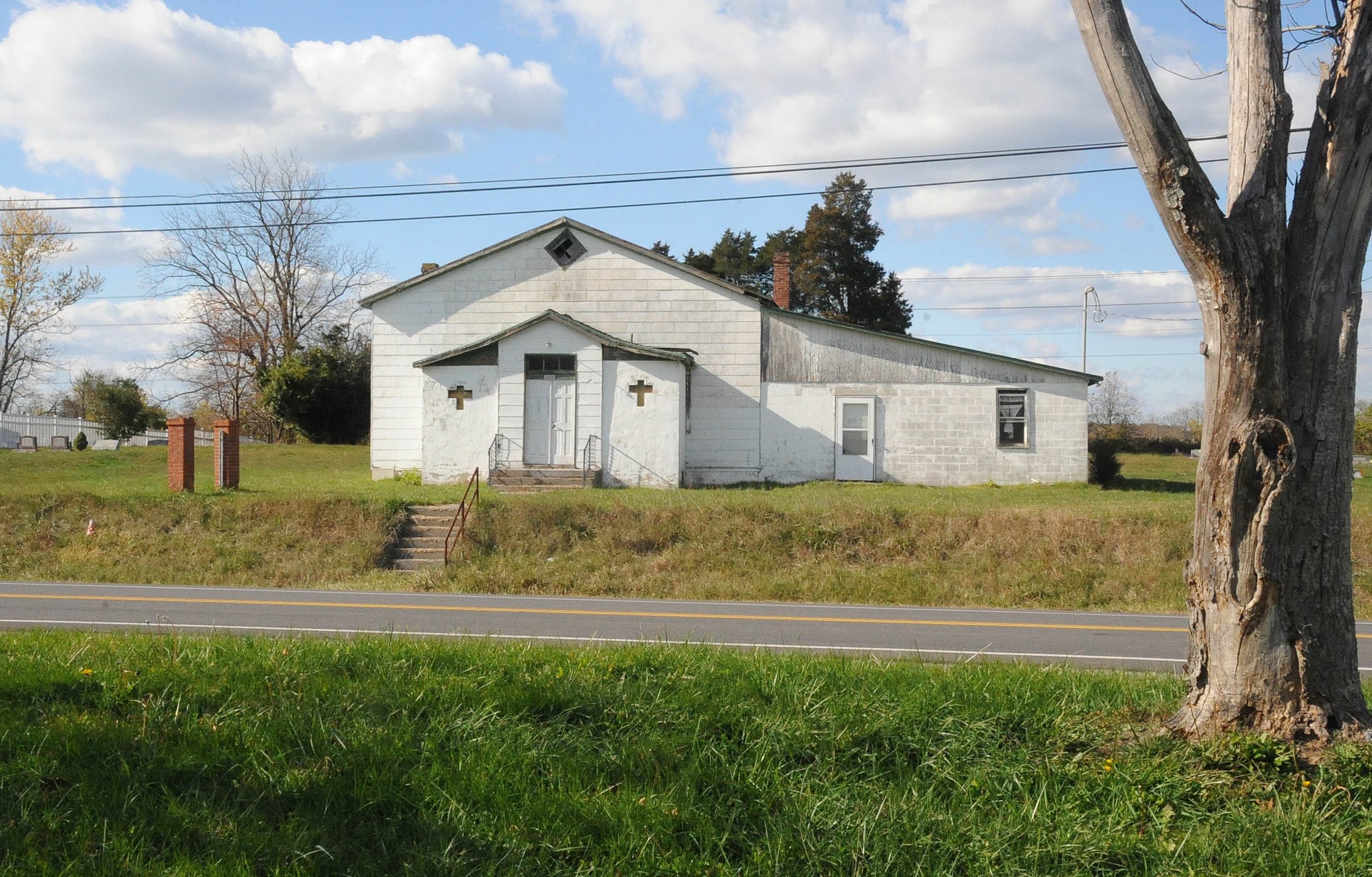
- Ebenezer Primitive Baptist Church, built 1918

- Location within Northern Virginia Location within Virginia Location within the United States
- Location: Roughly bounded by the Shenandoah R., the Warren Co. line, Virginia 340 and VA 618; E side of VA 255, approximately .2 mi. N of jct. with VA 723, Boyce, Virginia
- Coordinates: 39°3′14″N 78°3′1″W
- Area: 19,109 acres (7,733 ha)
- Architectural style: Mid 19th Century Revival, Early Republic, Colonial
- NRHP reference No.: 93001133, 97000154, 07001135
- VLR No.: 021-0963

Significant dates
- Added to NRHP: November 4, 1993, February 21, 1997 (Boundary Increase), October 30, 2007 (Boundary Increase)
- Designated VLR: August 18, 1993, December 4, 1996, September 5, 2007

Greenway Historic District is a national historic district located near Boyce, Clarke County, Virginia. It encompasses 432 contributing buildings, 23 contributing sites, and 35 contributing structures. The districts includes the agricultural landscape and architectural resources of an area distinctively rural that contains numerous large antebellum estates. The district contributing buildings are primarily farm and estate residences and their associated outbuildings. Other contributing buildings include three schools, five churches, two mills, a gas station, a restaurant, and a railroad station. The contributing structures are mostly corncribs and the contributing sites are mainly cemeteries and ruins of historic buildings. The district contains ten individual properties and two historic districts already listed on the Virginia Landmarks Register and National Register of Historic Places.

It was listed on the National Register of Historic Places in 1993, with boundary increases in 1997 and 2007.

== Gallery ==
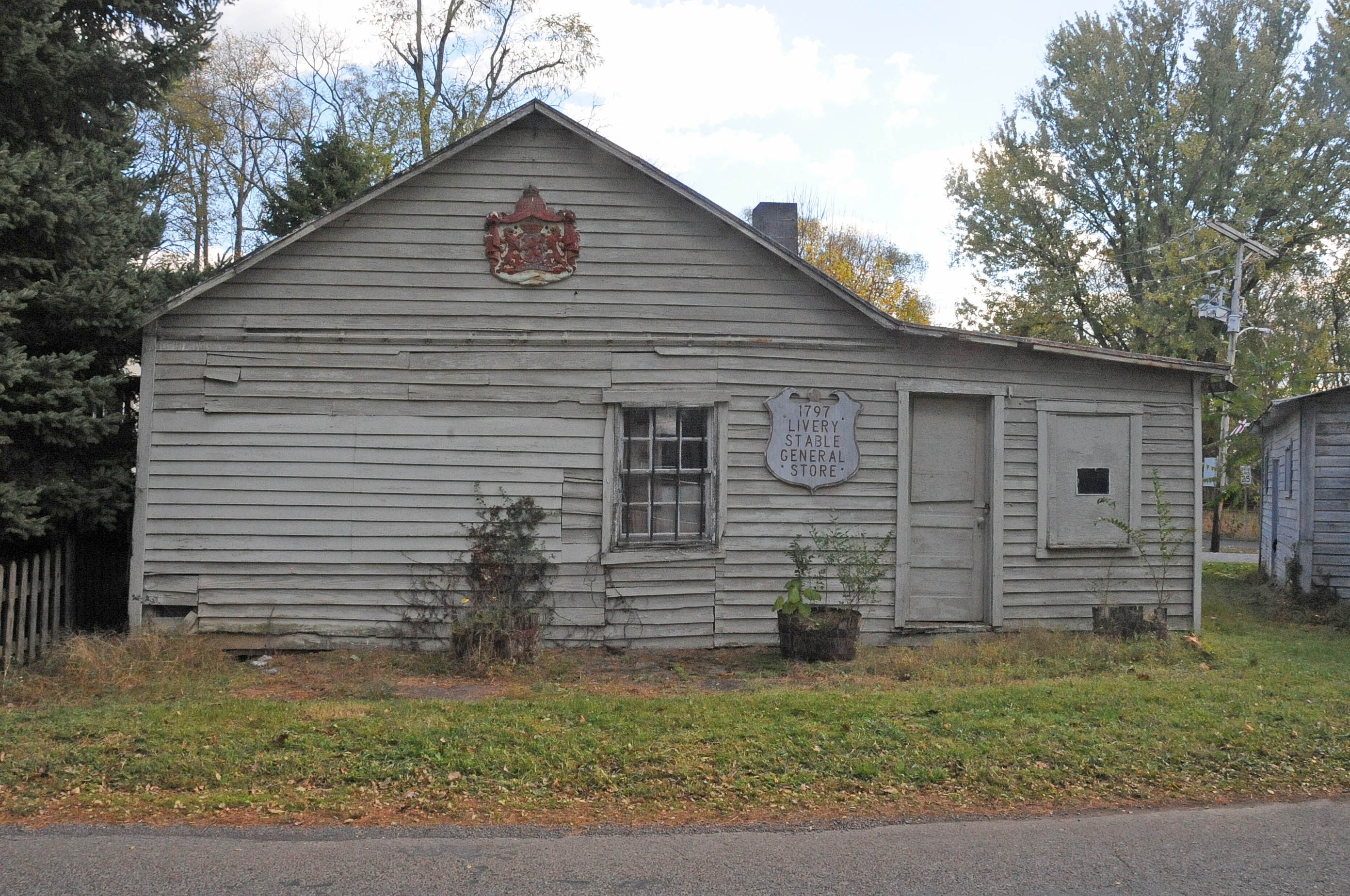
Livery stable and general store, built 1797

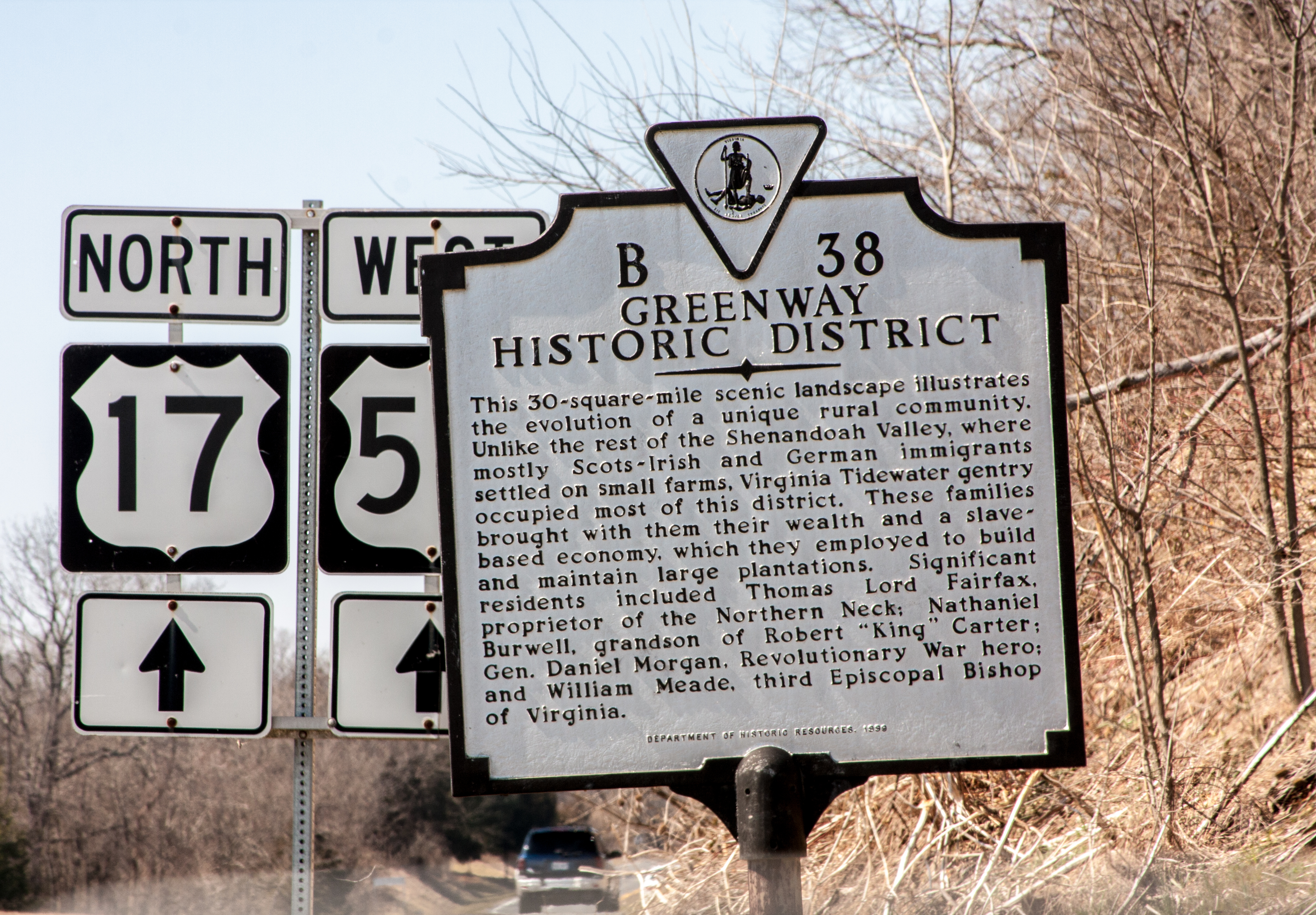
Greenway Historic District Marker

== See also ==
- River House
- National Register of Historic Places listings in Clarke County, Virginia
