= Valentino (1977 film) =

1977 Biopic by Ken Russell

- Theatrical release poster
- Directed by: Ken Russell
- Screenplay by: Ken Russell; Mardik Martin
- Based on: Valentino, an Intimate Exposé of the Sheik by Chaw Mank and Brad Steiger
- Produced by: Irwin Winkler; Robert Chartoff; Harry Benn
- Starring: Rudolf Nureyev; Leslie Caron; Michelle Phillips; Carol Kane
- Cinematography: Peter Suschitzky
- Edited by: Stuart Baird
- Music by: Stanley Black; Ferde Grofé
- Production company: Chartoff-Winkler Productions
- Distributed by: United Artists
- Release dates: October 4, 1977 (United Kingdom); October 5, 1977 (United States)
- Running time: 127 minutes
- Countries: United Kingdom; United States
- Language: English
- Budget: $5 million

Valentino is a 1977 biographical film co-written and directed by Ken Russell and starring Rudolf Nureyev, Leslie Caron, Michelle Phillips, and Carol Kane. It is loosely based on the life of silent film actor Rudolph Valentino, as recounted in the book Valentino, an Intimate Exposé of the Sheik, written by Chaw Mank and Brad Steiger.

The genesis of Valentino began with producers Irwin Winkler and Robert Chartoff, who began developing the project in 1975. Russell was selected to direct, and he co-wrote the film with Mardik Martin. Told through flashback following Valentino's 1926 death, the screenplay focuses heavily on Valentino's relationships with several women, chiefly his second wife Natacha Rambova, as well as addressing the published rumors of his alleged homosexuality.

Filming of Valentino was originally planned to occur in Los Angeles, but Russell chose to film in Spain and England's Elstree Studios instead due to budgetary issues. Principal photography lasted 21 weeks from August 1976 to January 1977, and the shoot was marked by tensions between stars Nureyev and Phillips, who clashed over their approaches to the material, as well as between Nureyev and Russell.

Released in October 1977, the film received mixed reviews from critics, some of whom lambasted it for its critical, and sometimes satirical depiction of Hollywood and the pressures of the film studio system; other critics praised the film for its lush visuals and performances. Despite the mixed critical response, the film received three BAFTA Award nominations, for Best Cinematography, Best Costume Design, and Best Production Design. Russell later described his decision to make the film instead of The Rose with Bette Midler as the biggest mistake of his career.

In his memoirs, Winkler called Valentino his "least favorite or worst film... by a large margin".

== Plot ==
In 1926, thousands of fans mob the wake of recently deceased film star Rudolph Valentino in New York City. When order is restored at the funeral home, a series of important women in Valentino's life come to mourn. Each remembers him via flashbacks: The first of these women, Bianca de Saulles, knew Valentino when he was a taxi dancer and gigolo in New York City, working under a woman named Billie Streeter. Upon meeting him, he shares with her his dream of owning an orange grove in California. After mobsters rob Valentino, he decides he must make the move west. Specifically, Bianca reminisces of a day when she witnessed Valentino romantically dancing with male ballet dancer Vaslav Nijinsky, teaching him how to do the tango.

Next is a young movie executive and screenwriter named June Mathis, who has an unrequited love for Valentino. She first meets Valentino in California, where he upsets Fatty Arbuckle by grabbing the starlet next to Arbuckle and romancing her into becoming his first wife, actress Jean Acker. Acker's glamorous and luxurious life motivates Valentino to try acting himself. Mathis recalls seeing him in a bit part in a movie and, based on that alone, recommending him for a larger role in her next project, The Four Horsemen of the Apocalypse. The hugely successful 1921 film launches Valentino to superstardom, and she is proud to have discovered him.

Alla Nazimova subsequently makes a flamboyant entrance at Valentino's funeral. She proceeds to make a scene and, when the photographers ask her to repeat it for the cameras, she obliges. Nazimova claims a relationship with Valentino and recalls working on Camille with him. Next, Nazimova's friend, art designer Natacha Rambova (and second wife of Valentino) enters and tells reporters that, even though she and Valentino are physically separated, they are still close via the spirit world. Her flashback shows that she was at first Nazimova's lover, but took advantage of Valentino's infatuation with her to help her social climb. During the filming of The Sheik, Rambova seduces Valentino with a seven veils dance. Despite knowing he is in the midst of divorcing Acker, she insists on going to Mexico so they can marry. Once they return to the United States, Valentino is arrested for bigamy. Because Jesse Lasky refuses to pay bail for Valentino, he has to spend the night in jail, where the guards deny him bathroom privileges and, with the other prisoners, taunt him about his lack of masculinity. The result is his complete humiliation.

On the set of Valentino's subsequent film, Monsieur Beaucaire, Rambova and Sidney Olcott take over directing. Two stage hands, wondering if 'Rambova calls the shots in bed, too', toss a pink powder puff onto Valentino's lap. Rambova demands that whoever did it come forward or she and Valentino will walk off the set for good. Valentino finishes the picture, but Rambova insists he refuse future work at Paramount until Lasky meets certain demands. Lasky suspends them and the couple end up broke. A man named George Melford approaches them, offering to help them book personal appearances for Mineralava, a beauty product company. The tour is a success, and, with Melford's help, Valentino and Rambova negotiate a good deal with Lasky.

Later, Valentino reads a newspaper article questioning his manhood and implying he is homosexual. The article outrages Valentino, who challenges the reporter to a duel. For 'legal reasons' the duel becomes a boxing match. Rory O'Neil, who happens to be a professional boxer, stands in for the reporter. The fight becomes a ballet of sorts, and flashbacks to the dance with Nijinsky parallel the match. Valentino eventually lands a blow which wins him the fight. However, he now begins to exhibit signs of an ulcer.

O'Neil asks for a rematch, this time a drinking contest. Despite his ulcer, Valentino accepts. Although Valentino defeats O'Neil again, his excessive drinking exacerbates the ulcer, which perforates when he returns to his home that night. He dies crawling on the floor, unable to reach an orange he had drunkenly played with and dropped on the floor.

== Cast ==
- Rudolf Nureyev as Rudolph Valentino
- Leslie Caron as Alla Nazimova
- Michelle Phillips as Natacha Rambova
- Carol Kane as Jean Acker, Fatty's girl
- Felicity Kendal as June Mathis
- Seymour Cassel as George Ullman
- Huntz Hall as Jesse Lasky
- Alfred Marks as Richard Rowland
- David de Keyser as Joseph Schenck
- Linda Thorson as Billie Streeter
- Leland Palmer as Marjorie Tain
- Lindsay Kemp as Angus McBride
- Peter Vaughan as Rory O'Neil
- Penelope Milford as Lorna Sinclair
- Emily Bolton as Bianca de Saulles
- Anthony Dowell as Vaslav Nijinsky
- William Hootkins as Fatty Arbuckle
- Don Fellows as George Melford
- John Justin as Sidney Olcott
- Anton Diffring as Baron Long
- Jennie Linden as Agnes Ayres
- Dudley Sutton as Willie Coleus

== Analysis ==
=== Historical accuracy ===
Film historian Gene D. Phillips notes that the grand set pieces and events exhibited in Valentino, including the dramatic prison sequence, the lavish Four Horsemen of the Apocalypse film set, and the climactic boxing match, all fit neatly within the narrative framework as they are rooted in some historical basis. "They are in each case founded on facts which are magnified but not distorted," Phillips suggests. Alexander Bland, who wrote The Nureyev Valentino: Portrait of a Film (1977) which chronicles the making of the film, states that "only in isolated sequences—Lasky communicating with an ape, a powder-puff cabaret, couples fox-trotting round the boxing ring—has Russell let his fancy of the lead... Russell has taken liberties, but he has not strayed into license." Summarizing Russell's handling of the film's historical accuracy, Bland further elaborated:

His problem was to enclose a many-layered, multi-faceted story within a simple framework. He had to show Valentino as the victim of commercial society, Valentino as a symbol of innocence blighted by success, Valentino as a fly caught in the monstrous but glittering web of show business, Valentino as the supreme sex symbol. He was all of that, but he was also a human individual. That dilemma is what Russell's film is all about.

Some scholars have noted the film's interpolation of certain events and characters, particularly the film's presentation of Alla Nazimova as she dramatically enters the funeral home to mourn Valentino: (in reality Neither Alla Nazimova nor Natacha Rambova attended Valentino's funeral) Film scholar Joseph Lanza suggests that Russell "folds the personages" of Nazimova and actress Pola Negri—another woman who had a close relationship with Valentino, but who does not appear as a character in the film—together. Lanza cites the fact that, per contemporaneous press accounts, Negri famously fainted several times during her visit to Valentino's wake, while there is no evidence suggesting the same of Nazimova.

=== Treatment of Valentino's sexuality ===
Russell sought to explore elements of Valentino's sexual life, including documented rumours encircling Valentino during his lifetime that he was homosexual, which no film adaptations of his life had done before. Russell attempted to contact Jean Acker, Valentino's first wife, to discuss the reasons for their short-lived marriage (the two separated the day after they were married), but Acker, 80 years old at the time of production, refused to speak to Russell.

Film scholar Brian Faucette notes that the film continually shows how "the people who interact with Valentino are constantly trying to discover his sexual orientation ... Russell does imply that women value Valentino as a sexual object but that Valentino is not a man interested in selling his body for money."

== Production ==
=== Development ===
The idea of a biopic of Rudolph Valentino was considered by producers Irwin Winkler and Robert Chartoff. "What excited us was the idea of Valentino as the first personality created by the mass media instrument in its infancy, and the inconsistency between his own life and his screen persona", Chartoff said. Winkler and Chartoff commissioned writer Mardik Martin to begin researching Valentino's life and develop a screenplay. Both Winkler and Chartoff were admirers of Ken Russell's films, and sought him to direct the project. The three had a meeting in London, and he ultimately agreed to direct.

Russell helped write the screenplay along with Martin, which went through several drafts, making sure to "zoom in on a few incidents and expand them to produce the maximum effect." Faucette further observes that the film's opening dance sequence between Valentino and Nijinsky "allows Russell to hint at the idea that Valentino may be dancing with this man because of sexual desire, rather than out of mere professional obligation ... The way that this scene is staged implies that the viewer has become a voyeur of an intimate moment between lovers."

=== Casting ===
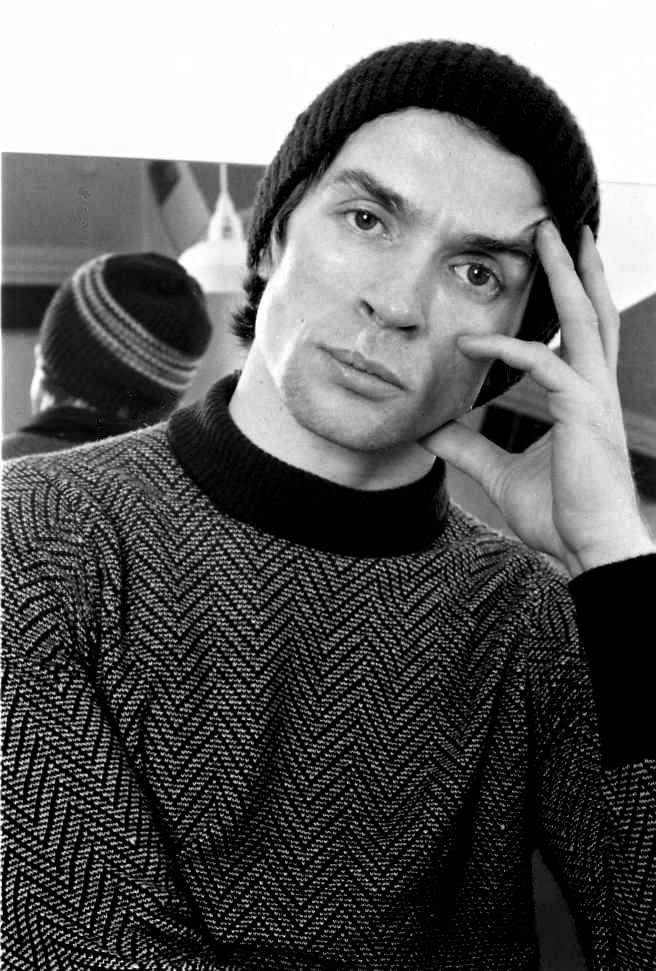
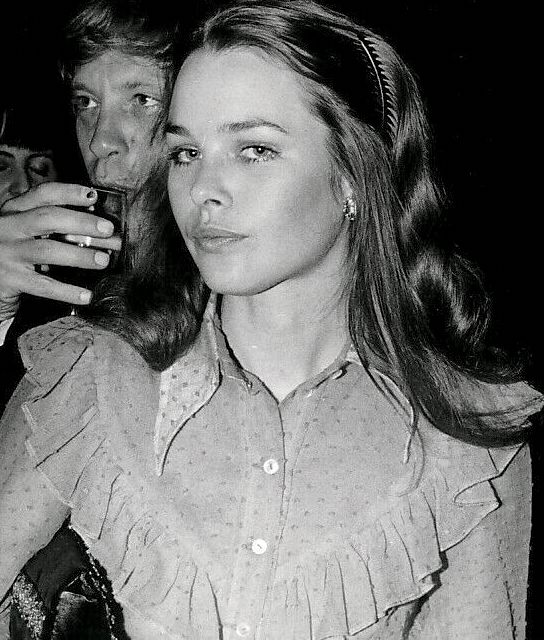
Rudolf Nureyev and Michelle Phillips were cast in the lead roles of Rudolph Valentino and Natacha Rambova, respectively

Rudolf Nureyev, a Russian-born dancer, was initially asked by Russell to appear as dancer Vaslav Nijinsky, after Russell had uncovered lore that Valentino had taught Nijinsky the tango in New York; Russell envisioned the film's opening sequence consisting of this interaction. However, after several unsuccessful attempts at casting the role of Valentino (Paul Clarke, a dancer who was initially cast, died of a heart attack prior to production), Russell proposed to the producers that they ask Nureyev to instead star in the title role. Nureyev had previously been considered to play Valentino by director Vittorio De Sica in a biopic that never came to fruition. After meeting with Nureyev in Amsterdam in 1975, Winkler and Chartoff concluded: "There was no doubt in any of our minds as the evening ended that the part was his. The Nijinsky role was subsequently granted to Anthony Dowell. Because Nureyev had a years' worth of dancing obligations booked at the time, the production was postponed until 1976 when Nureyev had availability. Though he agreed to the project, Nureyev had some reservations based on Russell's reputation for being strong willed: "We both have strong personalities and opinions, but it was his film, and naturally he knows far more about films than I do."

Michelle Phillips, a former vocalist in The Mamas and the Papas who had made her major feature film debut in Dillinger (1973), was cast as Natacha Rambova, Valentino's lover and eventual wife. Russell had been impressed by Phillips's performance in the aforementioned film, and felt she embodied both the sexuality and toughness that he envisioned for his version of Rambova. "I asked [Russell] to dinner at a Mexican restaurant", Phillips recalled. "When he arrived I had my hair done up in braids as I thought Rambova would have been. I didn't want to leave everything to chance." To prepare for the role, Phillips contacted Rambova's sister, Katherine Peterson, who resided in California, and spoke with her on the phone for several hours about Rambova's life. Phillips approached the role under the supposition that Rambova was a lesbian, but "about as asexual as you can get; [I think] her real turn-ons were artistic." She also read Valentino's own autobiography, My Private Diary, in order to glean an understanding of Rambova from his point of view.

French actress Leslie Caron was cast as Alla Nazimova, Rambova's friend and confidant. Caron felt that Nazimova had "been made more extravagant in the film than she actually was", but said she still "loved" the character. In smaller supporting roles, William Hootkins appears as Fatty Arbuckle, while Carol Kane was cast as Fatty's girlfriend, a young starlet who becomes a friend of Valentino. British actress Felicity Kendal, then known for her work in British television, was cast as June Mathis, a studio executive who was infatuated with Valentino. Several of the cast members, including Nureyev and Caron, screened several of Valentino's films to prepare for their roles.

=== Filming ===
"He's generous and vital artistically and he's vulnerable in quite an overt way. He's like a gigantic clam. He opens himself to everybody and then when he gets hurt that huge shell of his shuts with a bang."

— Nureyev on Russell's temperament while filming

Russell originally intended to shoot Valentino in Los Angeles, but opted instead to anchor the production in England, as eighty percent of the film was to be shot on interior sets, and filming in the United States would have doubled the production costs. Principal photography began August 8, 1976 in Almeria, Spain, and spanned a twenty-one week period. The latter half of the shoot took place at England's Elstree Studios. Establishing shots of the coastline were filmed on the Costa Brava, and one day of the shoot was spent at a zoo in Barcelona. The Spanish locations served as stand-ins for California. The Blackpool Tower ballroom in Blackpool, Lancashire, also served as a shooting location, while the nearby Illawalla was used for some interior shots.

The shoot was notably difficult between Nureyev and Phillips, who clashed on set over their approaches to the material. Nureyev, who esteemed the discipline required of dance, felt that Phillips's "relaxed and free-wheeling approach" to acting was too unrestrained. After filming was completed, Nureyev openly admitted, "I found it difficult to adjust to playing opposite her." Nureyev made a similar observation of Russell's directing style, which he characterized as "guiding rather than imposing ... He imposes his wavelength on the people who are working with him and then taps their ideas," though he spoke favorably of Russell, describing him as considerate and open to ideas in spite of his meticulous nature. The film's assistant director, Jonathan Benson, noted that while Russell and Nureyev "both behaved very professionally, they did not get close; Russell was never comfortable with him." Phillips admired Russell's free-form directing style, commenting: "He's extremely creative. He inspires you. You aren't locked up in the dialogue or script, he's always willing to talk about it."

Cinematographer Peter Suschitzky noted that Russell was especially meticulous about the framing of shots: "Russell's very visual approach is a great help but he can be demanding. He has strong obsessions which are sometimes difficult to understand. He has an obsessive fear of things being cut off, for instance, and will do retakes just to get a fraction of an inch more headroom or space around the feet, retakes not for an improved performance but for camera." Filming was officially completed in January 1977, after what Russell characterized as "twenty-one weeks of concentrated anxiety."

=== Music ===
Russell chose to score the film largely with compositions by American composer Ferde Grofé. Grofé had died fifteen years prior to the making of the film, but Russell was given access to numerous recordings by Grofé's son in Los Angeles. Russell felt that music was vital to the film, as important "as if I were making a movie on a composer ... I realized that Grofés type of tuneful, rather dated and idiosyncratic style would well suit our slightly satirical film." Grofé's compositions were adapted and arranged by English composer Stanley Black.

== Release ==
United Artists released Valentino theatrically in United Kingdom on October 4, 1977, premiering it at the Leicester Square Theatre in London. It opened in the United States the following day, October 5, premiering in Los Angeles.

=== Home media ===
Valentino is available on VHS and DVD in many territories, and was also released on Blu-ray in the US (Kino Lorber), UK (British Film Institute) and France (Bel Air Classiques).

== Reception ==
=== Box office ===
The film topped the British box-office for two weeks, but was not a hit in America.

=== Critical response ===
Valentino garnered mixed reviews from film critics. Janet Maslin of The New York Times praised the performance of Caron, but felt that Nureyev "has trouble delivering snappy patter with much conviction", and that Phillips, though " suitably steely-eyed", lacked authenticity. However, Maslin praised the film's visuals as "extremely handsome".

However, The Village Voice called the film "so embarrassingly and extensively bad that it achieves a kind of excruciating consistency with the rest of his [Russell's] career." Charles Champlin of the Los Angeles Times dismissed the film as "superficial and silly". Although Gene Siskel of the Chicago Tribune gave a three-star rating to the film, sensing that it was a critique of the Hollywood studio machine, he noted that it suffered from what he felt was Russell's apparent dislike and disregard for Valentino. Bob Groves of the Buffalo Courier-Express praised Nureyev's performance in the title role, and noted that "his dignity and sense of humor remained intact" throughout; he also liked the writing and a few scenes despite noting that "many are there for exploitative shock value".

Several critics commented on the film's wry depiction of Hollywood as an oppressive industry, such as Maslin, who felt that "the best parts of the film are those that pit Valentino against Hollywood, which both he and Mr. Russell seem to see as the biggest affront of them all." Richard Schickel of Time alternately excoriated the film for its "relentless anti-Americanism, implying that the unfortunate inhabitants of these shores are the only citizens of the world capable of materialism or vulgarity." Russell himself responded to the criticisms suggesting the film had an anti-American or anti-Hollywood tone: "I don't hate Hollywood. I am passionately dispassionate of my treatment of it in Valentino. Some studio executives like Jesse Lasky were hard on Valentino, so I show them being hard on him. Commenting on claims that Russell's depictions blended fact with fiction, he said: "I only want to be accurate up to a point. I can be as inaccurate as I want—it makes no difference to me. I'm writing a novel. My films are novels, based on a person's life, and a novel has a point of view."

Kevin Thomas of the Los Angeles Times observed that the film would likely be most enjoyed by those unfamiliar with Valentino or his work. Thomas praised Nureyev's debut as "impressive," adding that Phillips's portrayal of Rambova "really rivets attention. Her Natacha is far more sympathetic than past interpretations, showing her to possess an innocence and candor for all her posturing." Thomas felt the film's greatest strength, however, was its "implicit attack on the primitive, destructive concept of all-American manhood... Typically for Russell, Valentino is charged with sexual ambiguity, but Nureyev's Valentino emerges powerfully, if tragically, as a man."

Russell later stated that he would rather forget Valentino. The film was included in John J. B. Wilson's 2005 book The Official Razzie Movie Guide. Valentino holds a 46% rating on Rotten Tomatoes based on 13 reviews.

==== Accolades ====
Institution	Year	Category	Recipient(s)	Result	Ref.
British Academy Film Awards	1978	Best Cinematography	Peter Suschitzky	Nominated	
British Academy Film Awards	1978	Best Costume Design	Shirley Ann Russell	Nominated	
British Academy Film Awards	1978	Best Production Design	Philip Harrison	Nominated	
British Society of Cinematographers	1978	Best Cinematography	Peter Suschitzky	Nominated	

== Sources ==
- Bland, Alexander (1977). The Nureyev Valentino: Portrait of a Film. London, England: Studio Vista. ISBN 978-0-289-70795-1.
- Ellis, David A. (2012). Conversations with Cinematographers. London, England: Bloomsbury. ISBN 978-0-810-88126-6.
- Faucette, Brian (2009). "Defending Rudy: Alternative Masculinities in Ken Russell's Valentino". In Flanagan, Kevin M. (ed.). Ken Russell: Re-Viewing England's Last Mannerist. Lanham, Maryland: Scarecrow Press. pp. 155–178. ISBN 978-0-810-86955-4.
- Flanagan, Kevin M. (2009). Ken Russell: Re-Viewing England's Last Mannerist. Lanham, Maryland: Scarecrow Press. ISBN 978-0-810-86954-7.
- Lanza, Joseph (2007). Phallic Frenzy: Ken Russell and His Films. Chicago, Illinois: Chicago Review Press. ISBN 978-1-569-76482-4.
- Phillips, Gene D. (1979). Ken Russell. Boston, Massachusetts: Twayne Publishers. ISBN 978-0-805-79266-9.
- Wilson, John (2005). The Official Razzie Movie Guide: Enjoying the Best of Hollywood's Worst. New York City, New York: Grand Central Publishing. ISBN 0-446-69334-0.
