= Scaleby (Boyce, Virginia) =

Historic house in Virginia, United States

- U.S. National Register of Historic Places
- Virginia Landmarks Register
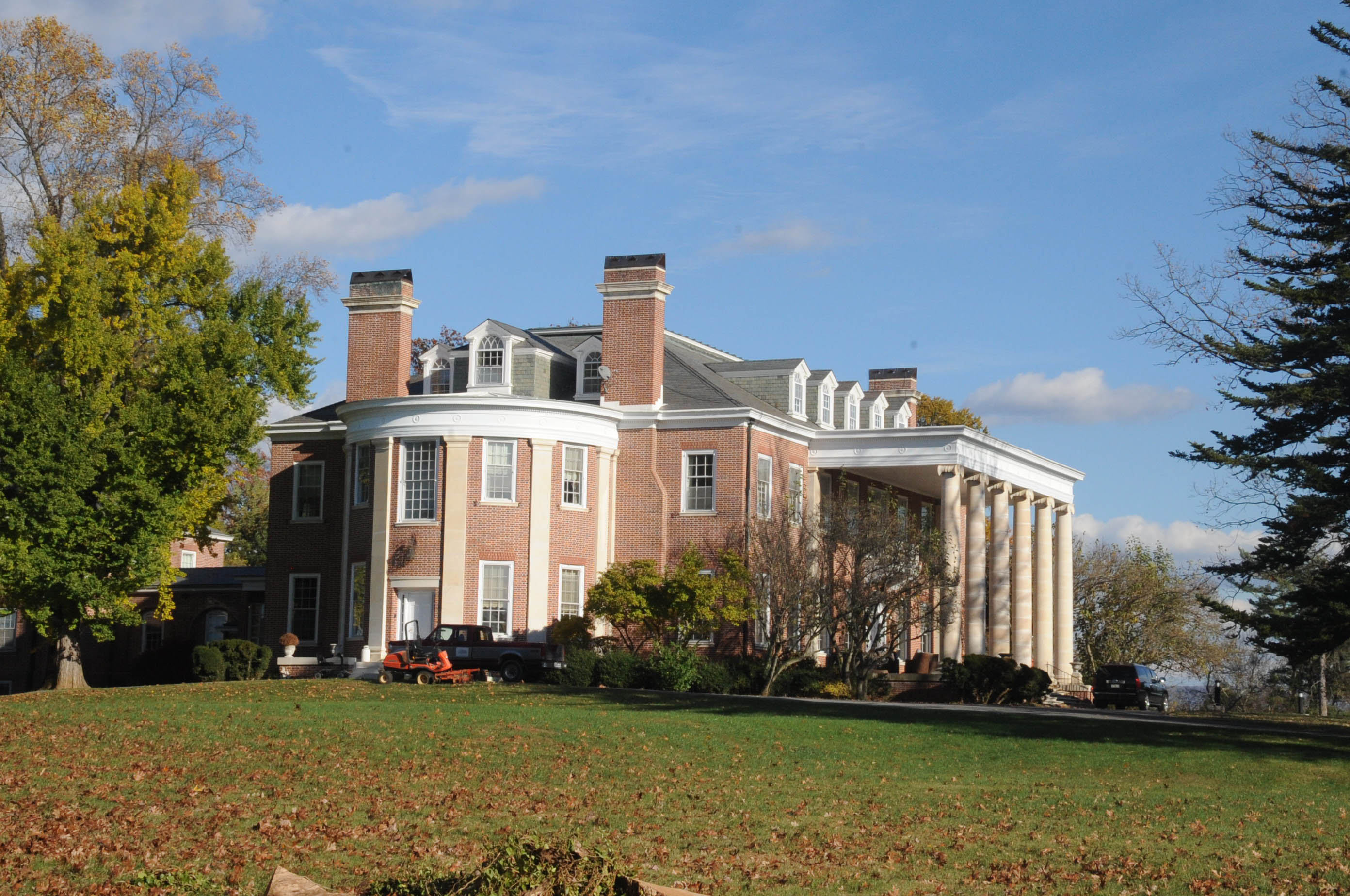

- Location within Northern Virginia Location within Virginia Location within the United States
- Location: Co. Rd. 723 S of jct. with US 340, near Boyce, Virginia
- Coordinates: 39°5′34″N 78°2′45″W
- Area: 200.5 acres (81.1 ha)
- Built: 1909-1911
- Built by: Sill, Howard; Sill, Buckler, Fenhagen
- Architectural style: Colonial Revival
- NRHP reference No.: 90002000
- VLR No.: 021-0086

Significant dates
- Added to NRHP: December 28, 1990
- Designated VLR: April 17, 1990

Scaleby is a historic estate home and farm located near Boyce, Clarke County, Virginia. The main house and associated outbuildings were built between February 1909 and December 1911 for Henry Brook and Hattie Newcomer Gilpin. The 30,000-square-foot (2,800 m^{2}) house was named for the wealthy family's ancestral home in England.

== Description ==
The main house is a 2 1/2-story, nine-bay, brick dwelling in the Colonial Revival style. It consists of a main block measuring 100 feet by 70 feet, connected to a dependency by a 36 feet long hyphen. The front facade features a five-bay front porch supported by colossal Ionic order columns. Also on the property are the contributing Gardener's Cottage, the Farm Manager's House, the stable, the garage, a barn, a double-crib barn, the tenant house, a smokehouse, a water storage facility, the pumphouse, a two-story tower-like water catchment facility, a garden pergola, an ice-well with a gazebo, a stone terrace, and a concrete-lined pond. The main house has a steel frame, with reinforced concrete floor and stair construction

Scaleby was listed on the National Register of Historic Places in 1990.
