= Millwood Colored School =

- U.S. National Register of Historic Places
- Virginia Landmarks Register
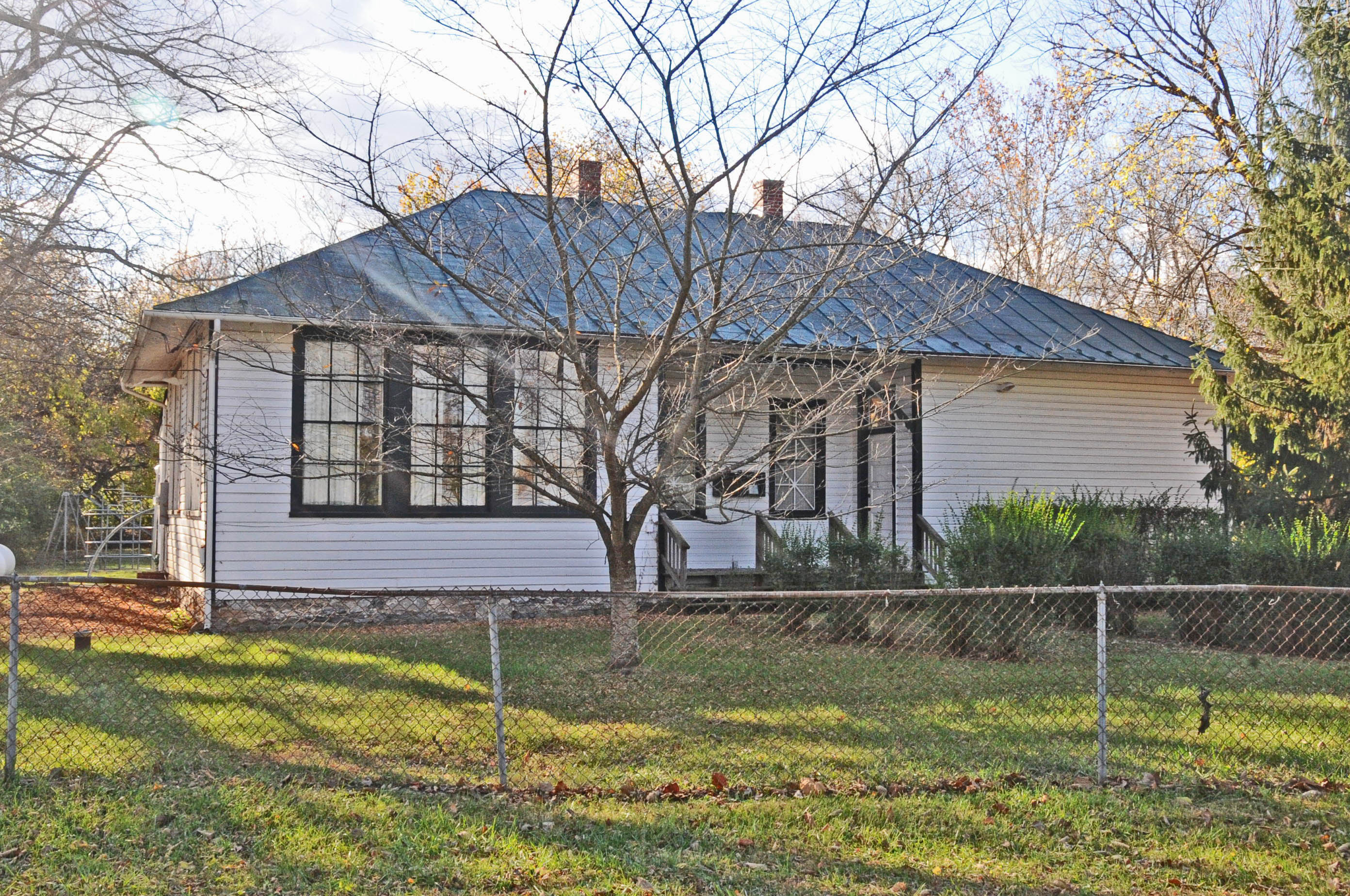
- Millwood Community Center, originally Millwood Colored School

- Location within Northern Virginia Location within Virginia Location within the United States
- Location: 1610 Millwood Rd., Boyce, Virginia
- Coordinates: 39°04′29″N 78°02′31″W
- Area: 0.7 acres (0.28 ha)
- Built: 1910
- NRHP reference No.: 00001431
- VLR No.: 021-0192-0008

Significant dates
- Added to NRHP: November 22, 2000
- Designated VLR: September 13, 2000

Millwood Colored School, now known as Millwood Community Center, is a historic school building for African-American children located at Boyce, Clarke County, Virginia. It was built about 1910, and is a one-story, hip-roofed school has a two-room plan with coat closets, and a kitchen. The building measures approximately 60 feet long and 30 feet wide. It features a recessed entry, two entrance doors, overhanging eaves with scalloped exposed rafter ends, double-hung windows with wooden tracery, five-panel doors, and sits on a limestone foundation. It was used as an elementary school until 1952, then sold to the Millwood Good Will Association for use as a community center.

It was listed on the National Register of Historic Places in 2000.
