= Boyce, Virginia =

Town in Virginia, US

- Town
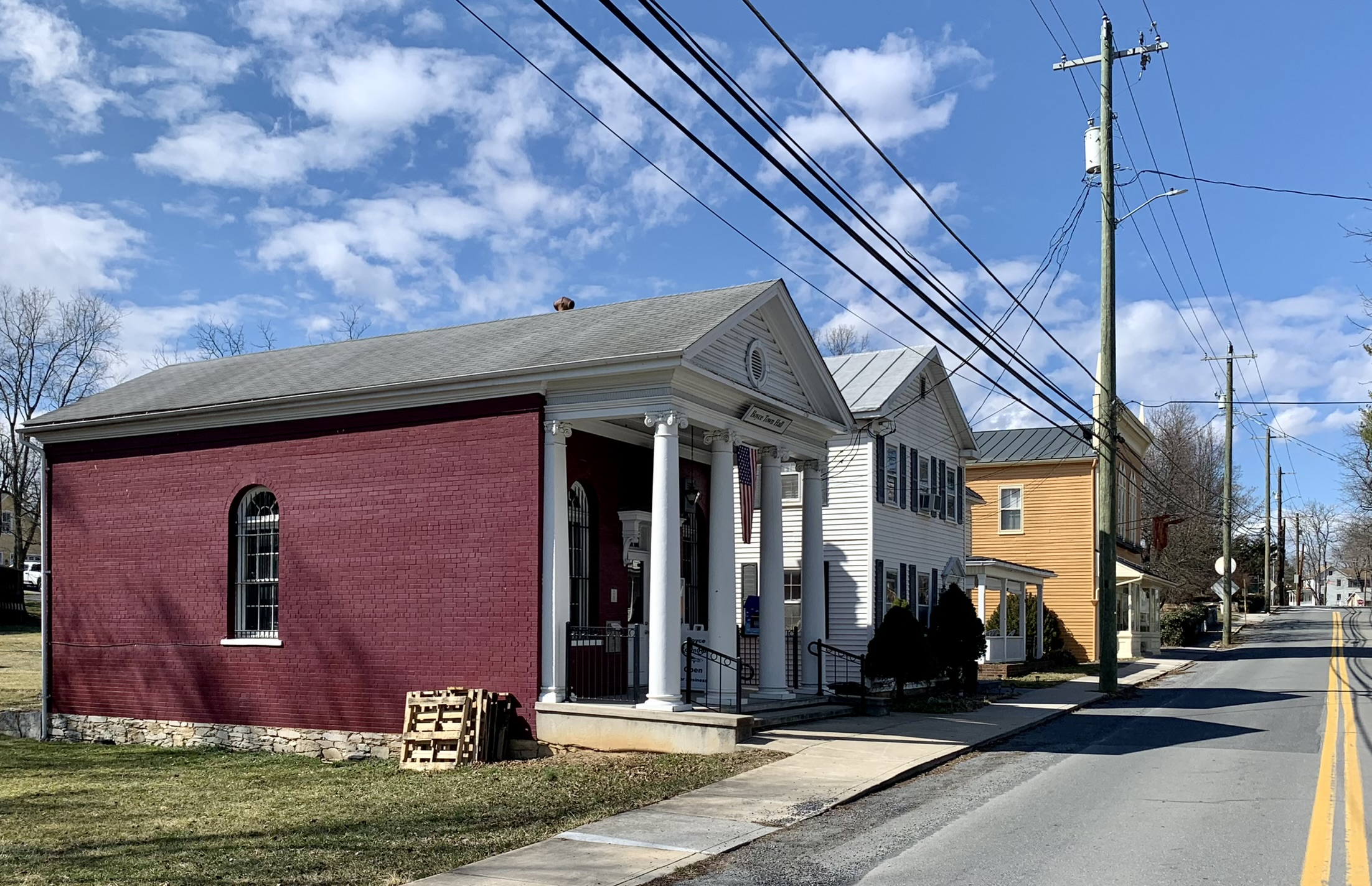
- Boyce Historic District, including the town hall (foreground)

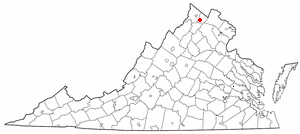
- Location of Boyce in Virginia
- Coordinates: 39°5′35″N 78°3′33″W
- Country: United States
- State: Virginia
- County: Clarke

Area
  - Total: 0.37 sq mi (0.95 km^{2})
  - Land: 0.37 sq mi (0.95 km^{2})
  - Water: 0 sq mi (0.00 km^{2})
- Elevation: 597 ft (182 m)

Population (2020)
  - Total: 749
  - Estimate (2019): 627
  - Density: 1,707.5/sq mi (659.26/km^{2})
- Time zone: UTC−5 (Eastern (EST))
  - Summer (DST): UTC−4 (EDT)
- ZIP code: 22620
- Area code: 540
- FIPS code: 51-08984
- GNIS feature ID: 1492615
- Website: boyceva.net

Boyce is a small incorporated town in Clarke County, Virginia, United States. It is located in the DC-Maryland-Virginia metropolitan area. The population was 749 at the 2020 census, up from 589 at the 2010 census.

== Geography ==
Boyce is located in western Clarke County at 39°5′35″N 78°3′33″W (39.093118, −78.059190), along U.S. Route 340. It is 6 miles (10 km) southwest of Berryville, the county seat and 16 miles (26 km) northeast of Front Royal.

According to the United States Census Bureau, the town has a total area of 0.35 square miles (0.9 km^{2}), all land.

The town is situated at the crossing of the Norfolk & Western Railway and the Winchester and Berry's Ferry Turnpike about 2 miles (3 km) northwest of Millwood, of which it is the shipping point; 3 miles (5 km) each from Old Chapel and White Post; and 9 miles (14 km) southeast of Winchester, Virginia. It is built upon a ridge, which drains on the east into Page Brook and to the west into Roseville Run. Boyce is apparently well underlaid with water; the town well reaches to a recorded depth of 165 feet (50 m).

== Demographics ==
Historical population
Census	Pop.	Note	%±
1920	301		—
1930	325		8.0%
1940	342		5.2%
1950	372		8.8%
1960	384		3.2%
1970	378		−1.6%
1980	401		6.1%
1990	520		29.7%
2000	426		−18.1%
2010	589		38.3%
2020	749		27.2%
U.S. Decennial Census

As of the census of 2000, there were 426 people, 159 households, and 114 families residing in the town. The population density was 1,179.9 people per square mile (456.9/km^{2}). There were 168 housing units at an average density of 465.3 per square mile (180.2/km^{2}). The racial makeup of the town was 86.38% White, 11.74% African American, 1.17% Native American, 0.23% Asian, and 0.47% from two or more races.

There were 159 households, out of which 27.0% had children under the age of 18 living with them, 57.2% were married couples living together, 11.3% had a female householder with no husband present, and 28.3% were non-families. 25.2% of all households were made up of individuals, and 10.1% had someone living alone who was 65 years of age or older. The average household size was 2.68 and the average family size was 3.19.

In the town, the population was spread out, with 25.8% under the age of 18, 5.2% from 18 to 24, 31.5% from 25 to 44, 24.4% from 45 to 64, and 13.1% who were 65 years of age or older. The median age was 37 years. For every 100 females, there were 106.8 males. For every 100 females age 18 and over, there were 98.7 males.

The median income for a household in the town was $48,333, and the median income for a family was $52,000. Males had a median income of $35,179 versus $21,354 for females. The per capita income for the town was $17,041. About 6.5% of families and 8.9% of the population were below the poverty line, including 8.5% of those under age 18 and 16.7% of those age 65 or over.

== Town history ==
=== Incorporation ===
The town of Boyce was incorporated by the Circuit Court for the County of Clarke on November 28, 1910, with a recorded population of 312.

The first election for mayor and four councilmen was held on December 20, 1910, through which W. M. Gaunt was elected Mayor and George W. Garvin, M. O. Simpson, J. T. Sprint and Geo. B. Harrison were elected Councilmen; and the Council duly organized on December 24, 1910, and elected Geo. B. Harrison as Recorder.

=== Railroad ===
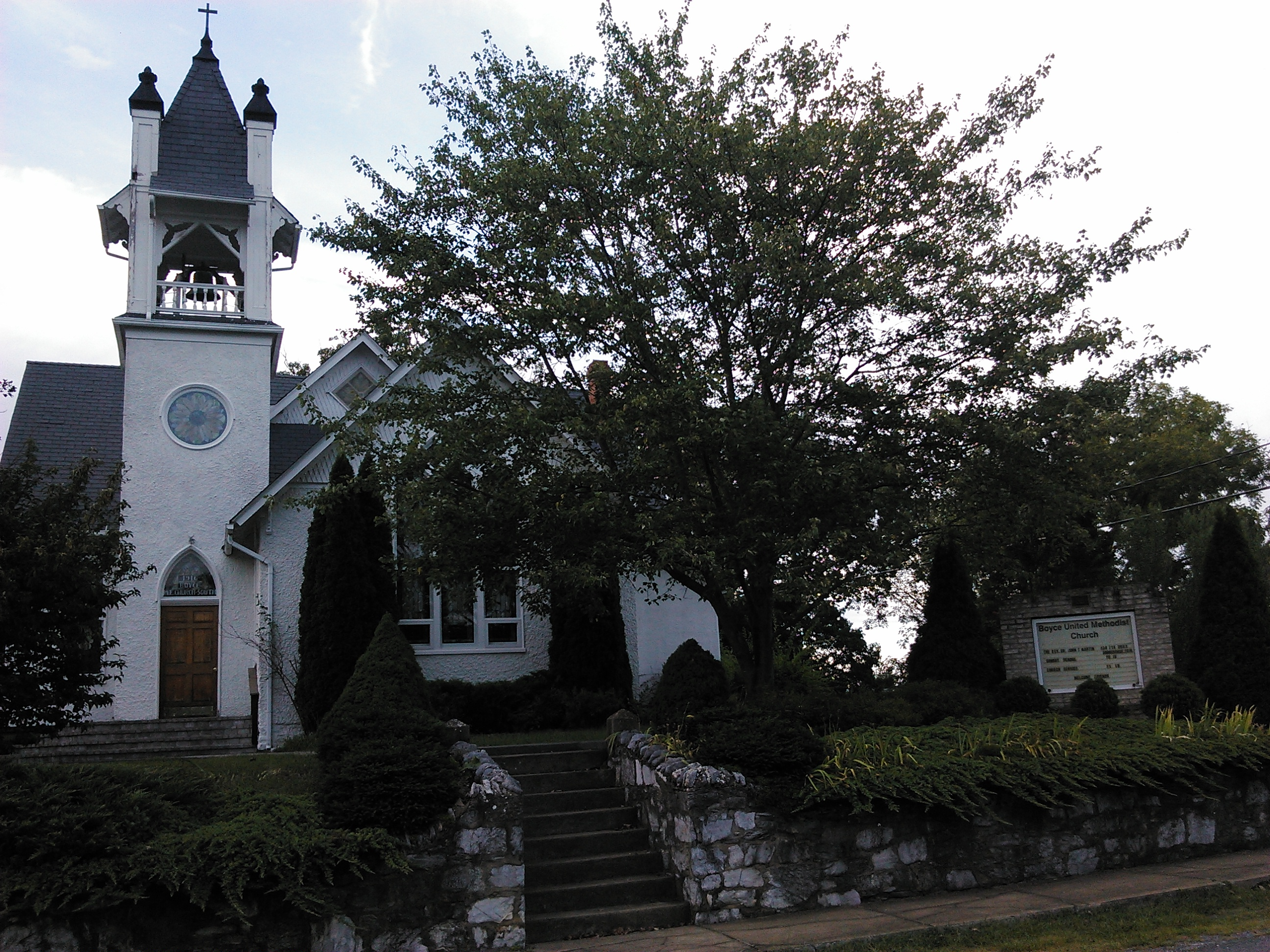
Boyce United Methodist Church

The Norfolk & Western Railway passes through the center of the business portion of the town, which at the time of the building of the railroad in 1881 was dense woods. The Norfolk & Western Railway erected a large station in the town in 1912.

The Shenandoah Valley Railroad (known as the Norfolk and Western for many years, now known as the Norfolk Southern) was constructed in Clarke County in 1879. It started in Hagerstown, Maryland, and went south to Roanoke, Virginia. The railroad opened its route from Hagerstown to Berryville on October 1, 1879.

The town of Boyce, located 6 miles (10 km) southwest of Berryville, began in 1881 with the arrival of the Shenandoah Valley Railroad. Located at the railroad crossing with the Millwood Turnpike, Boyce remains much as it was in the early 20th century. The town was named after Colonel Upton L. Boyce, who lived at the nearby Tuleyries estate and who was very influential in persuading the railroad to pass through Clarke County.

Previous to the current railroad station, there was a much smaller one located on the same side of the tracks but right along the Millwood Turnpike. The railroad was apparently upgrading some of their railroad stations during the early 1910s and were going to replace the original station in Boyce. The new building was to be a small wooden one, and sit along the west side of the tracks at its intersection with the Millwood Turnpike. According to local tradition and some historical accounts, the citizens of Boyce (and neighboring Millwood) wanted a larger, more ornate building and also wanted it to be located on the east side of the tracks. They apparently raised money on their own and gave it to the Norfolk and Western to upgrade to a larger station.

A December 11, 1912, article in The Clarke Courier entitled "New Depot for Boyce" states:

"The public spirit of the citizens of Boyce has again scored a victory. Some time ago the N & W Railway Company announced that it would erect a new passenger station at Boyce.

"The plans submitted by the railway company did not entirely suit the Boyce people, and they at once started a movement to secure a better piece of ground in order that a more pretentious station might be erected.

"The old buildings have been removed from the Page-Manning lot, and work on a new and commodious passenger station, of concrete construction, will be started at once.

"This is the spirit which builds cities.

"The Boyce people are quick to go down in their pockets and contribute to any and every cause which will advance their town...."

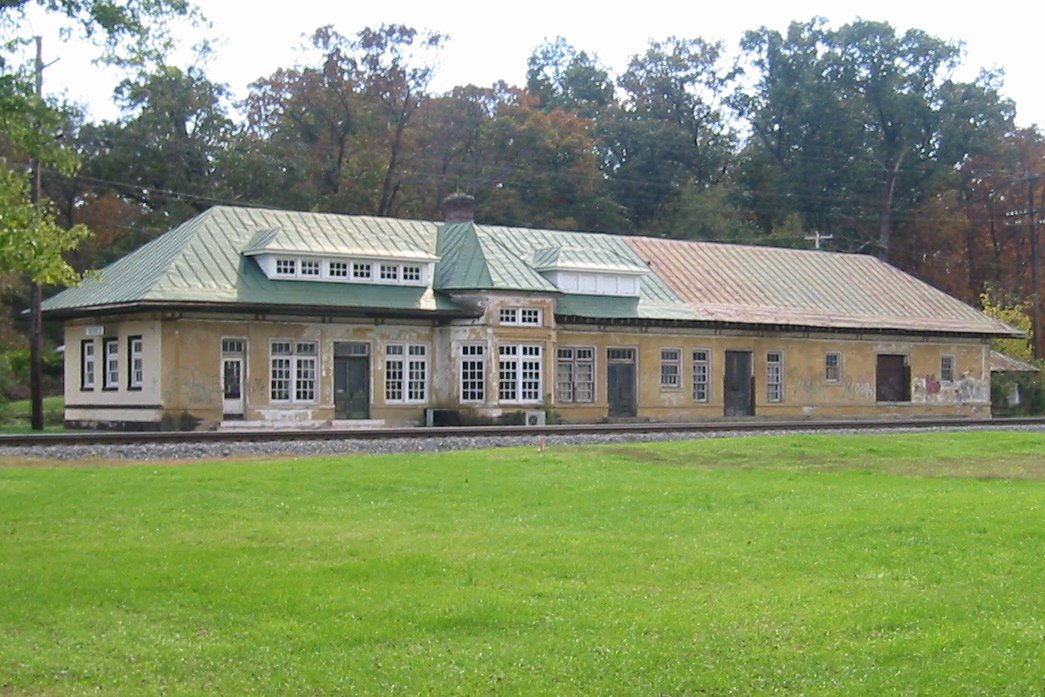
Former Boyce Railroad Station

The train station was completed in late 1913. A November 26, 1913, article in The Clarke Courier states:

"The new N & W station, with fine concrete platforms, and promenade, long train shed, electric-lighted throughout, with all modern conveniences for the comfort of patrons, is a great addition to the town."

In a December 23, 1914, article in The Clarke Courier, entitled "The Hustling Town of Boyce," the railroad station is described:

"...water is now piped to the railroad station. The railroad station constructed from tile and concrete and its 400 feet (120 m) of train shed, and 540 feet (160 m) of concrete platform, and 3 acres (12,000 m^{2}) of grounds and tracks, is a noble response by the officials of the railway to the requests of our people, and furnishes ample railroad facilities."

In 1913, George B. Harrison, a town councilman, wrote about Boyce and described the train station in the following manner:

"The Norfolk and Western Railway in kind response to the request of the community has erected a magnificent station of latest design and material with spacious grounds and facilities, fully equipped and provided with electric light and water."

Undeniably, the Boyce train station is a surprisingly large building for a community the size of Boyce. It was much bigger than the Berryville (county seat) station, constructed at about the same time. The reason for such an elegant station can probably be attributed to the wealth of many of the local citizens around Boyce and Millwood. Early in the twentieth century, Clarke County experienced an influx of wealthy settlers from the west and north. They were drawn to the county because of the presence of fox hunting, cheap land, and good climate. Many purchased older homes and restored them. Horse breeding and cattle raising became very popular. The local citizenry of Boyce and Millwood wanted a more elegant train station than what the N & W initially proposed, and they wanted it larger because they were transporting thoroughbreds and cattle on it.

The Boyce Railroad Station is thus an example of a rare instance where the citizens of the community wanted a larger and more pretentious facility than what the railroad company was willing to provide, and helped to fund the construction of the building themselves.

It appears that the N&W owned the building, although there is a metal sign on the central part of the station's polygonal bay that identifies its location as "H-461-A" and one that says "Not N&W". According to oral tradition, this means that the N & W did not own the building. However, when Mr. Kenneth Gilpin, Jr., purchased the building in the 1950s, he bought it from the Norfolk and Western. Since then the building has conveyed through several owners. The land on which the building sits, however, is still owned by the railway and is only leased to the owner of the building.

In recent years, several of the more substantial railroad stations on the Norfolk and Southern line in the Lower Shenandoah Valley have been demolished. The Boyce train station is thus one of a few surviving examples of such a station in this pan of Virginia, as the Berryville station was demolished in the late 1980s.

=== Facilities ===
The main street of the town is piped with water, and the fire department is located at the intersection of Main Street and U.S. Route 340. In addition to the public well, the town owns an electric plant and a lot on the railway in the center of the town, and has added thereto an alternating current plant with ninety kilowatt dynamo, so as to meet any possible demand for light or power; a switch will bring the coal to the powerhouse.

=== Churches ===
In 1914, the town contained an Episcopal and a Methodist church, and a Baptist parsonage (the Episcopal church being electrically lighted); a brick high school with seven teachers and an enrollment of about two hundred scholars; a brick bank with a capital of $15,000; a hotel and two livery stables; one pinning mill and two lumber yards; two grain elevators; nine stores-one being a department store; a butcher shop; a harness shop; and a barber shop. Adjoining the town is a large cattle plant, and the town is a large stock-shipping station. Including the then-incorporated town of Millwood, the population of the two towns was computed to be about eight or nine hundred. However, the large stone Episcopal Church complex has recently been deconsecrated and is currently being renovated, congregants traveling to the nearby churches including Christ Chapel in Millwood. The Baptist and Methodist (consecrated 1916) churches remain active.

== Historic sites ==
The Boyce Historic District, Blandy Experimental Farm Historic District, Greenway Historic District, Annefield, Huntingdon, Millwood Colored School, Saratoga—the home of Gen. Daniel Morgan—and Scaleby are listed on the National Register of Historic Places.

== Points of interest ==
- Orland E. White Research Arboretum

== Transportation ==
The primary highway serving Boyce is U.S. Route 340. US 340 is oriented northeast to southwest, generally parallel to Interstate 81 and U.S. Route 11, which lie to the west. To the southwest, US 340 connects with U.S. Route 17 and U.S. Route 50. To the northeast, it connects with Virginia State Route 7 and West Virginia Route 9.

== Education ==
A public elementary school (Boyce Elementary School) and a PK-8 private school (Powhatan School) are located in Boyce.
