= Boyce Historic District =

Historic district in Virginia, United States

- U.S. National Register of Historic Places
- U.S. Historic district
- Virginia Landmarks Register
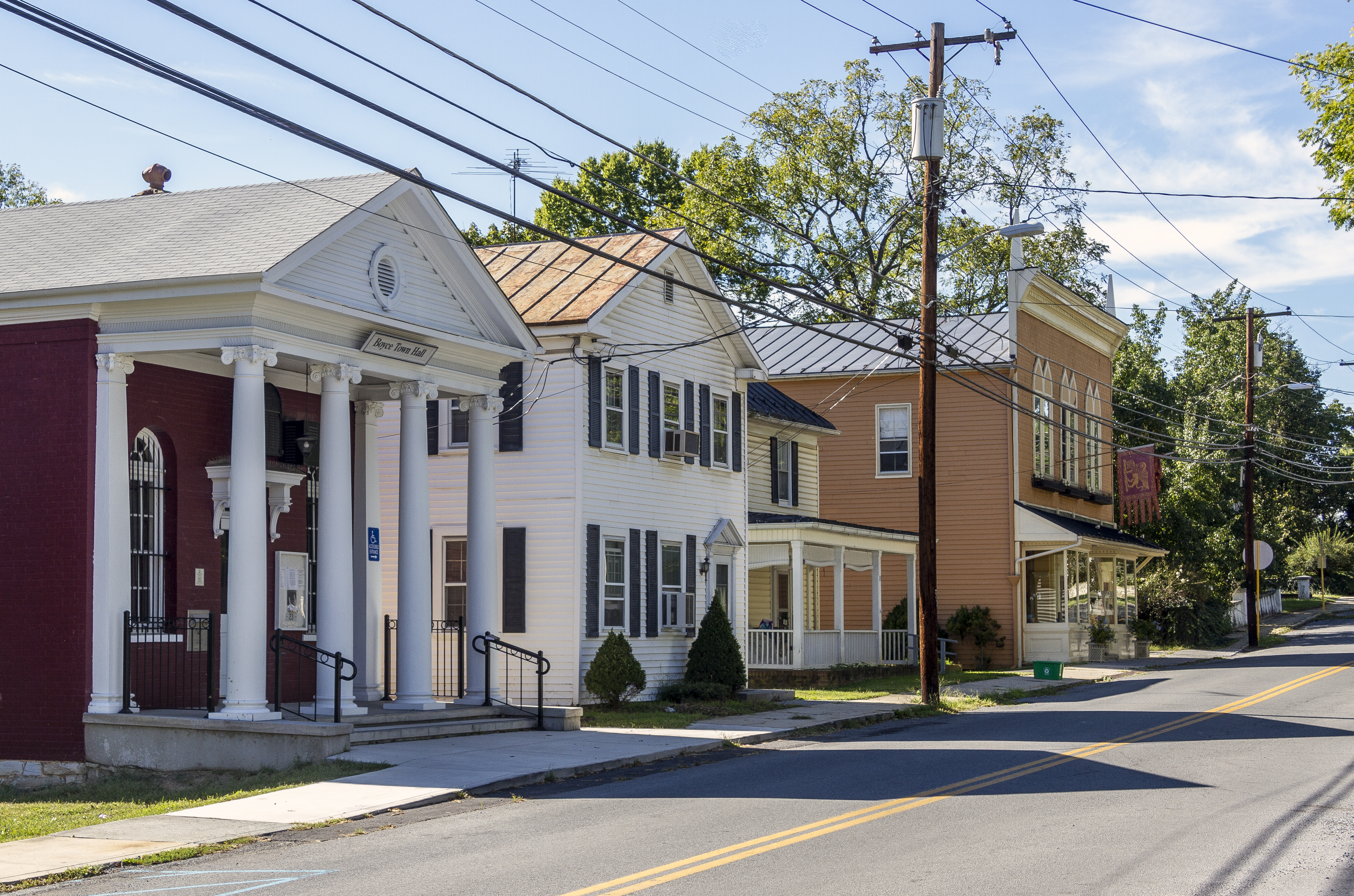
- Boyce Historic District, September 2012

- Location within Northern Virginia Location within Virginia Location within the United States
- Location: Includes Crescent Sts., Greenway Ave., Huntingdon Ln., Main St. Old Chapel Ave., Railroad Ln., Saratoga, VA, and Whiting, Boyce, Virginia
- Coordinates: 39°5′36″N 78°3′41″W
- Area: 102 acres (41 ha)
- Built: 1880
- Architectural style: Late Victorian, Classical Revival
- NRHP reference No.: 04000155
- VLR No.: 172-0001

Significant dates
- Added to NRHP: March 8, 2004
- Designated VLR: December 3, 2003

Boyce Historic District is a national historic district located at Boyce, Clarke County, Virginia. It encompasses 154 contributing buildings in the town of Boyce. They include a variety of residential, commercial, and institutional buildings dating from 1880 to the 1920s. Notable buildings include the Boyce Colored School (1885), Mount Zion Baptist Church (1910), Simpson's Store and later Boyce Grocery, former Boyce Bank now used as the Town Hall (1908), Boyce railroad station (1913), Boyce United Methodist Church (1916), and Emmanuel Chapel Episcopal Church (1916).

It was listed on the National Register of Historic Places in 2004.
