= Huntingdon (Boyce, Virginia) =

Historic house in Virginia, United States

- U.S. National Register of Historic Places
- Virginia Landmarks Register
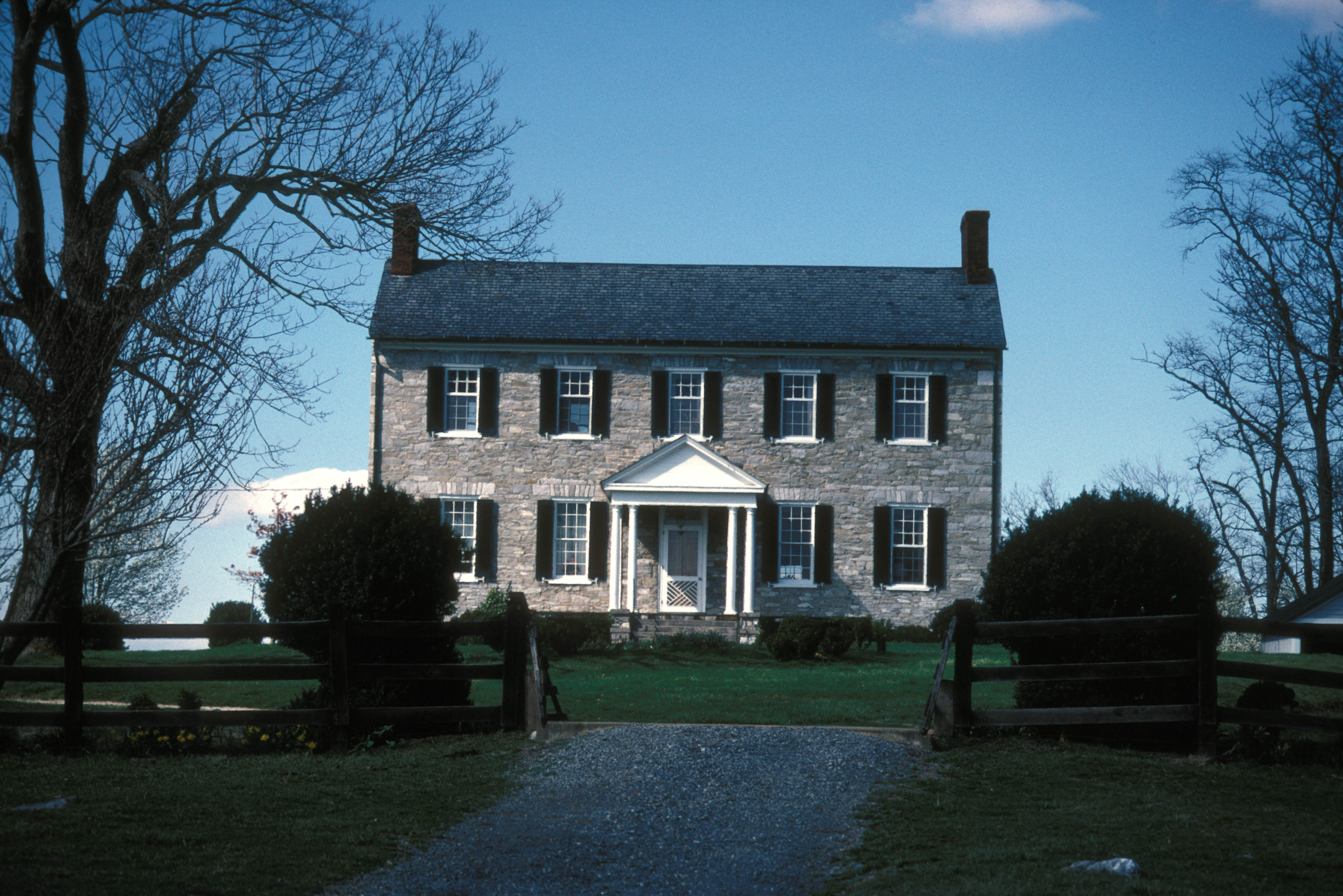
- Huntingdon, March 1971

- Location within Northern Virginia Location within Virginia Location within the United States
- Location: N of Boyce, near Boyce, Virginia
- Coordinates: 39°6′6″N 78°3′23″W
- Area: 297 acres (120 ha)
- Built: c. 1830, c. 1850
- NRHP reference No.: 79003035
- VLR No.: 021-0188

Significant dates
- Added to NRHP: May 25, 1979
- Designated VLR: September 9, 1969

Huntingdon, also known as The Meadow, is a historic plantation house located near Boyce, Clarke County, Virginia. The original section was built about 1830, and is a two-story, five-bay, stone I-house dwelling with a gable roof. A rear ell was added around 1850, making a T-shaped house. Also on the property are a contributing pyramidal roofed mid-19th-century smokehouse and a stone-lined ice pit with a late 19th-century, square-notched log icehouse.

It was listed on the National Register of Historic Places in 1979.
