= Skippool =

Coordinates: 53.8595°N 2.9809°W

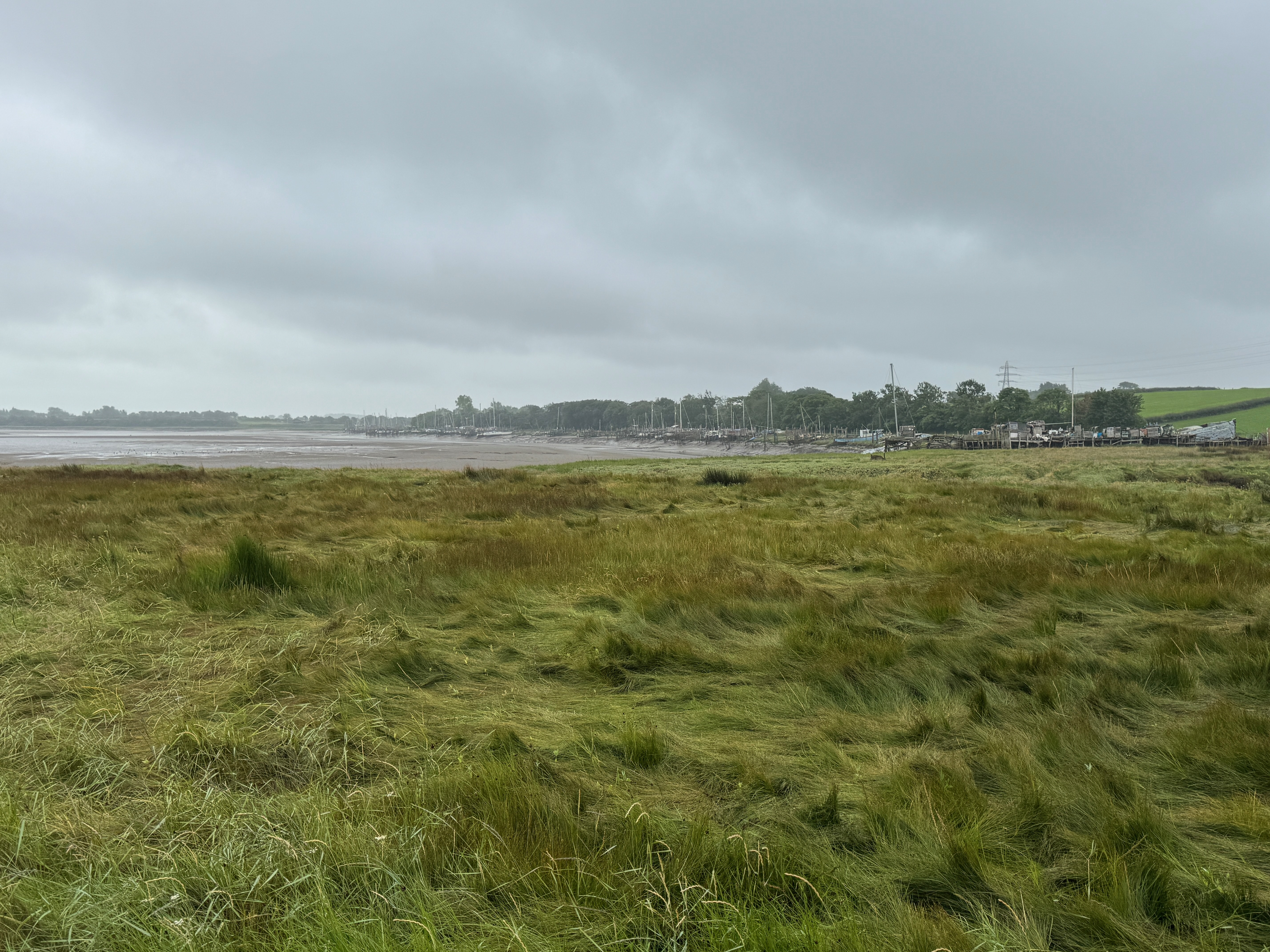
- Skippool Creek, looking south

- Location within Wyre Borough Location on the Fylde Location within Lancashire
- District: Wyre
- Shire county: Lancashire
- Region: North West
- Country: England
- Sovereign state: United Kingdom
- Post town: Thornton-Cleveleys
- Postcode district: FY5
- Dialling code: 01253
- Police: Lancashire
- Fire: Lancashire
- Ambulance: North West
- UK Parliament: Blackpool North and Fleetwood; Fylde

Skippool is an area of Thornton-Cleveleys, Lancashire, England. It is situated between Little Thornton and Poulton-le-Fylde along the western banks of the River Wyre, about 3 miles (4.8 km) south of its mouth between Fleetwood and Knott End. These banks are known as Skippool Creek, an historic docks area now home to mostly run-down vessels. The MV Good Hope, for example, may date from the 1830s. Skippool Creek is a short branch off Main Dyke, which empties into the River Wyre in front of Blackpool and Fleetwood Yacht Club.

The B5412 (Skippool Road) passes through Skippool, ending at the roundabout it shares with Mains Lane, Breck Road and Amounderness Way.

Skippool is believed to be a joining of the Old Norse word skip, which means ship, and the Old English pull/pol, for a slow-moving stream. It has been written on historical maps as Skippon, Skiffe-Pool and Skip Pool.

== History ==
Skippool, more specifically its creek, was a major trading port for hundreds of years, similar to that of Wardleys Creek on the other side of the river. It is understood to have been in constant use from the end of the Middle Ages. Goods arrived at the docks from all over the world. Flax was brought in from Ireland and the Baltic; timber came from North America; and tallow arrived from Russia. More locally, limestone and oats were transported from Ulverston and coal from Preston. Its popularity fell out of favour when Fleetwood's port opened in the 1840s.

A 1610 map gives the name of the river as Skippon Flue. In 1787, another map gives the area the modern spelling of Skippool.

A pub has stood on or near the site of today's Thornton Lodge since around 1750, when the Ousel Inn was established. In 1824, The Crackers Head was built. It became The White Horse a decade later.

A bone mill, called Silcocks, also stood near the docks. Silcocks Cottages, a home on Skippool Road about half a mile to the north, preserves this name.

== Sport ==
Thornton Cleveleys Cricket Club is located in Skippool, on land leased to it by Frederick J. Emery, one of the owners of the now-demolished Edwardian mansion The Illawalla, in the early 1950s.

== Businesses ==
Blackpool & Fleetwood Yacht Club is located just beyond the northern end of Wyre Road, which runs along the head of the docks.

Thornton Lodge, a chain pub and restaurant, is located near to the roundabout, just north of the Wyre Road junction.

== Notable residents ==
In addition to the Illawalla, there are three other notable residences on Skippool Road. Ashley Hall (or Ashley House), built in the 1920s, was where select celebrities would stay while they were appearing on Blackpool's North Pier. These include Danny La Rue and Roy Castle.

On the opposite side of the road is Thornton Hall.

On Wyre Road, The River House was built in the late 1830s. It was once a restaurant frequented by the likes of Rudolf Nureyev, George Harrison and prominent politicians. It was run by members of the Scott family.

== Transport ==
Archway Travel routes 74 and 75 buses service Skippool Road.

== References in popular culture ==
In nearby Thornton-Cleveleys, Skippool Creek Brewery was founded in 2016.

== Gallery ==
The River Wyre from Skippool Creek, looking east to Shard Bridge (right of centre)

Docks at Skippool Creek in 2017
