= Jean Acker =

American actress (1892–1978)

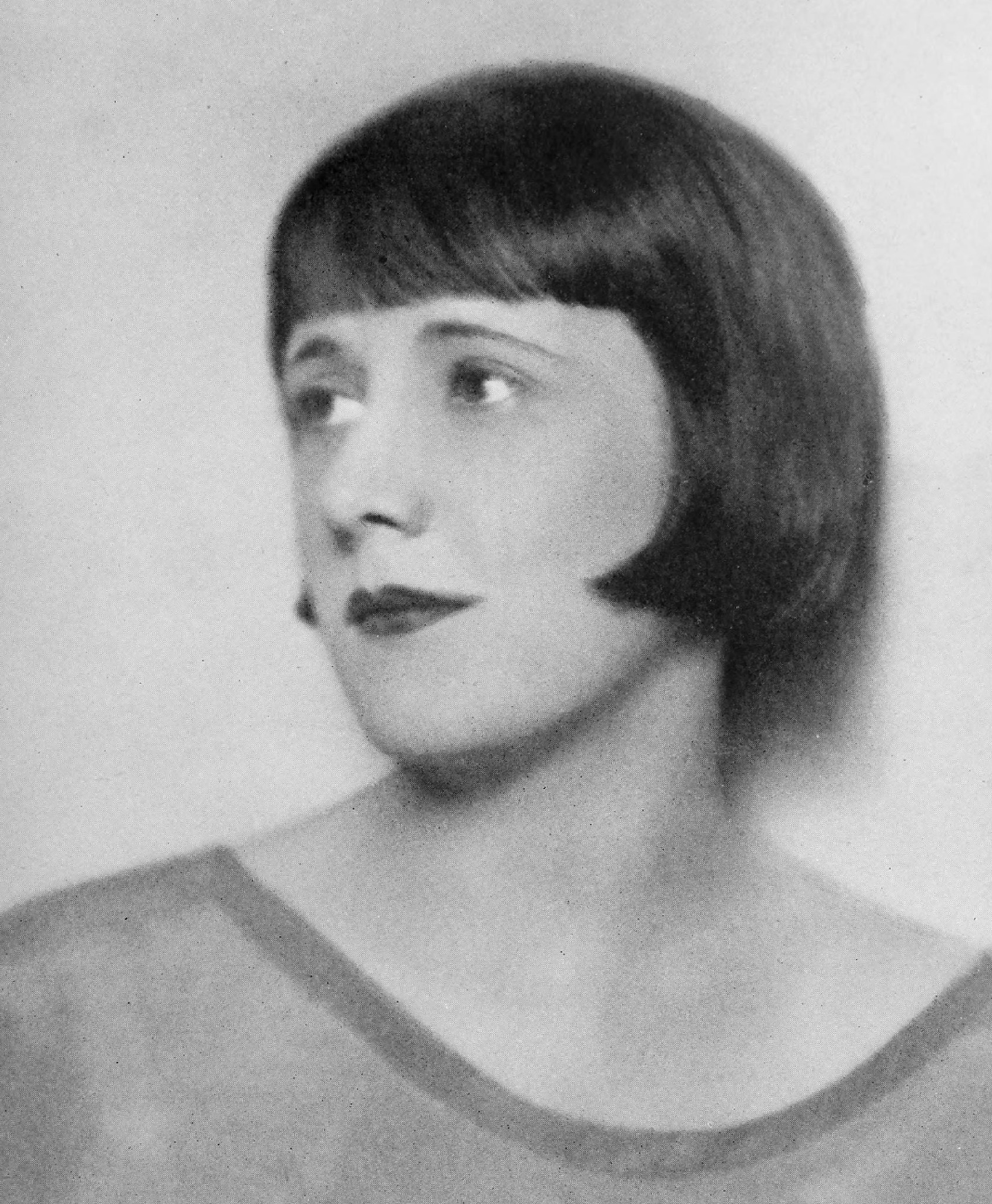
- Acker in 1923
- Born: Harriet Ackers; October 23, 1892; Trenton, New Jersey, U.S.
- Died: August 16, 1978 (aged 85); Los Angeles, California, U.S.
- Resting place: Holy Cross Cemetery
- Other names: Harriet Guglielmi; Mrs. Rudolph Valentino
- Occupation: Actress
- Years active: 1913–1955
- Spouse: Rudolph Valentino (m. 1919; div. 1922)
- Partner(s): Grace Darmond (1918–1923); Chloe Carter (1923–1978)

Jean Acker (born Harriet Ackers; October 23, 1892 – August 16, 1978) was an American actress. Best known for her brief marriage to screen idol Rudolph Valentino, Acker's career began in the silent film era and extended into the 1950s.

== Early life and career ==
Jean Acker was born Harriet Ackers on October 23, 1892 in Trenton, New Jersey to Joseph and Margaret Ackers. The 1900 census indicates an 1891 birthdate, and other sources have suggested an 1893 birthdate. However, her burial plot says 1892. Her mother was Irish and her father part Cherokee. They divorced when she was young.

Her father remarried to Eleanor Bruseren in 1906. They had two sons together, both named Joseph. Their first son died at 4 months old in 1907, and their second son was a stillbirth. Eleanor and Joseph divorced in 1912, and he married a third time to Virginia Erb. Her father managed the Casino Bowling Alley and The Ritz Restaurant, and later owned the Boston Shoe Store on Valley Street. He also managed several bowling alleys in the Philadelphia area.

In 1906, the family moved to Lewistown. Growing up on a farm, Acker became an expert horsewoman. She attended St. Mary's Seminary in Springfield, New Jersey for a time.

In a 1913, Acker remarked, "On Sundays I answer to the name of Miss Jean Acker, and weekdays I'm just Billie." She claimed to have been born in St. Louis to Spanish parent. At the time, she was a little-known performer who had worked in vaudeville and stock-company theater before joining Sigmund Lubin's motion picture operation in Philadelphia and later moving on to the Independent Motion Picture Company (IMP) studio in New York.

She performed in vaudeville until she moved to California in 1919. After arriving in Hollywood, Acker became the protégée and lover of Alla Nazimova, an actress whose clout and contacts enabled Acker to negotiate a $200 per week contract with a movie studio. Acker appeared in numerous films during the 1910s and 1920s, but by the early 1930s, she began appearing in small, mostly uncredited film roles. She made her last on-screen appearance in the 1955 film How to Be Very, Very Popular, opposite Betty Grable.

== Personal life ==
=== Marriage to Rudolph Valentino ===
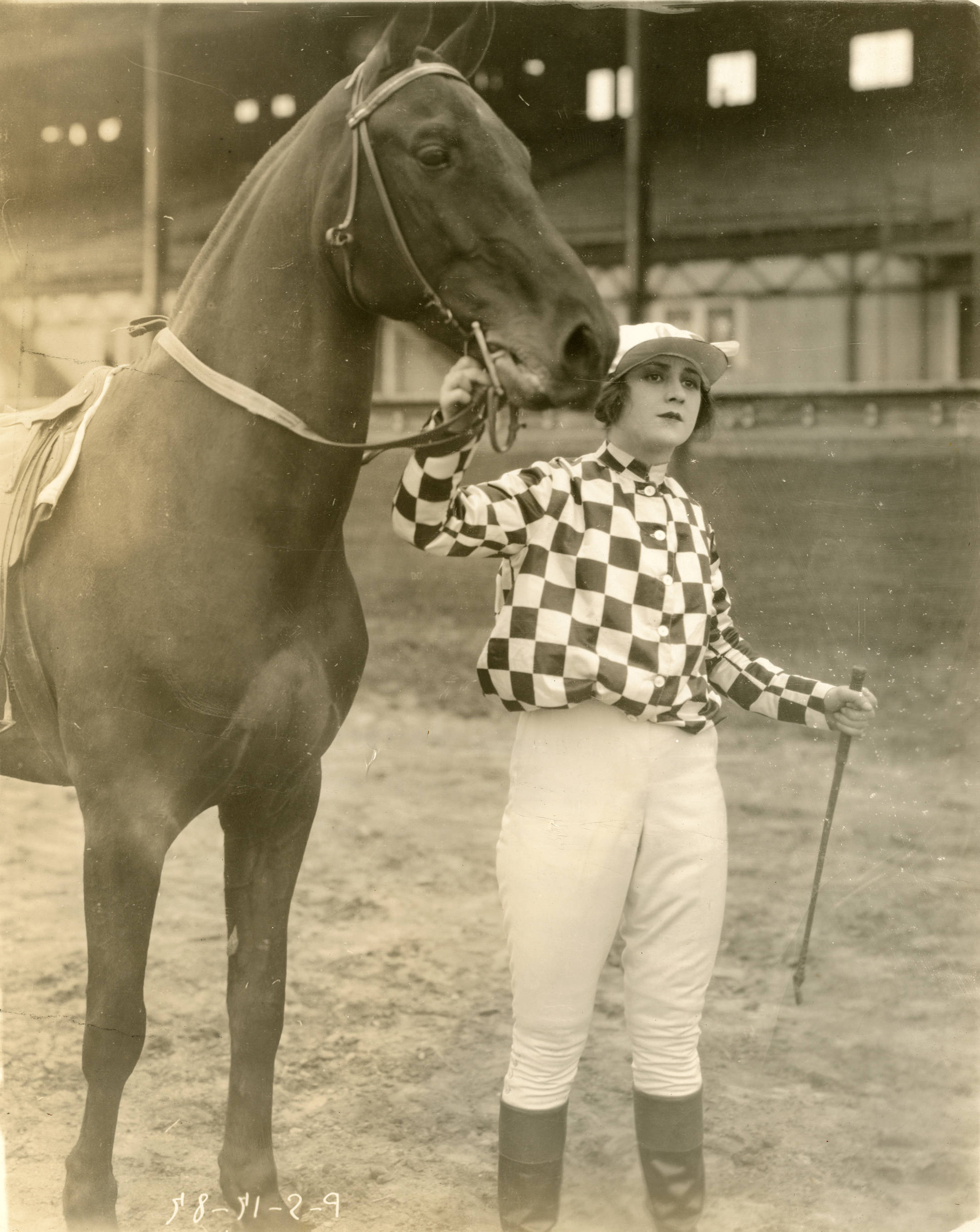
Film still of Acker as Pert Barlow in Checkers (1919)

After meeting and befriending the then-unknown Italian actor Rudolph Valentino at a party, they entered a two-month courtship and married at the home of film producer Maxwell Karger in Hollywood on November 5, 1919. Acker soon regretted the marriage and reportedly locked Valentino out of their hotel room on their wedding night. Following their separation on their wedding night, Valentino sought a reconciliation and wrote a letter to Acker urging her to return. The couple briefly reunited after meeting at a party the next month and spent one night together on December 5, but Acker left him again the next day. Asked why she could not live with her husband, Acker reportedly said, "He's impossible, he's dictatorial."

Valentino continued to pursue Acker while she was on location in Lone Pine, California, filming The Roundup in 1920. Although she attempted to prevent his visit—while allowing her lover Grace Darmond to see her—Valentino wired ahead announcing his arrival. By the time he reached Lone Pine, however, Acker had already left. He confronted her at Darmond's Los Angeles apartment, where the two got into a heated argument, and Acker informed him that she intended to seek a Reno divorce.

After Valentino secured leading roles in The Four Horsemen of the Apocalypse and Camille, Acker filed a maintenance suit in January 1921, alleging that Valentino had deserted her following his rise to success. At the time, Acker claimed she was ill with stomach ulcers, unable to work, and burdened with debts totaling $2,500. An agreement between their attorneys provided for temporary payments of $50, which Acker later alleged were not maintained. Valentino denied her allegations and filed a cross-complaint seeking a divorce on the grounds that Acker had deserted him. Acker testified that Valentino's fame had altered him, stating, "He deserted me. He was nothing when I married and when he arrived he lost interest in me." She said that she didn't want a divorce and that she was his soulmate. Valentino said that a financial settlement was the motive for her action. "Her telegrams and letters were filled with sweetness, but her words were bitter... Work has forced me to go my way, though I have always wished for her happiness." The court ultimately ruled in favor of Valentino on January 10, 1922, granting the divorce and denying Acker a decree and separate maintenance. However, Valentino agreed to cover her medical expenses and pay temporary alimony of $175 per month.

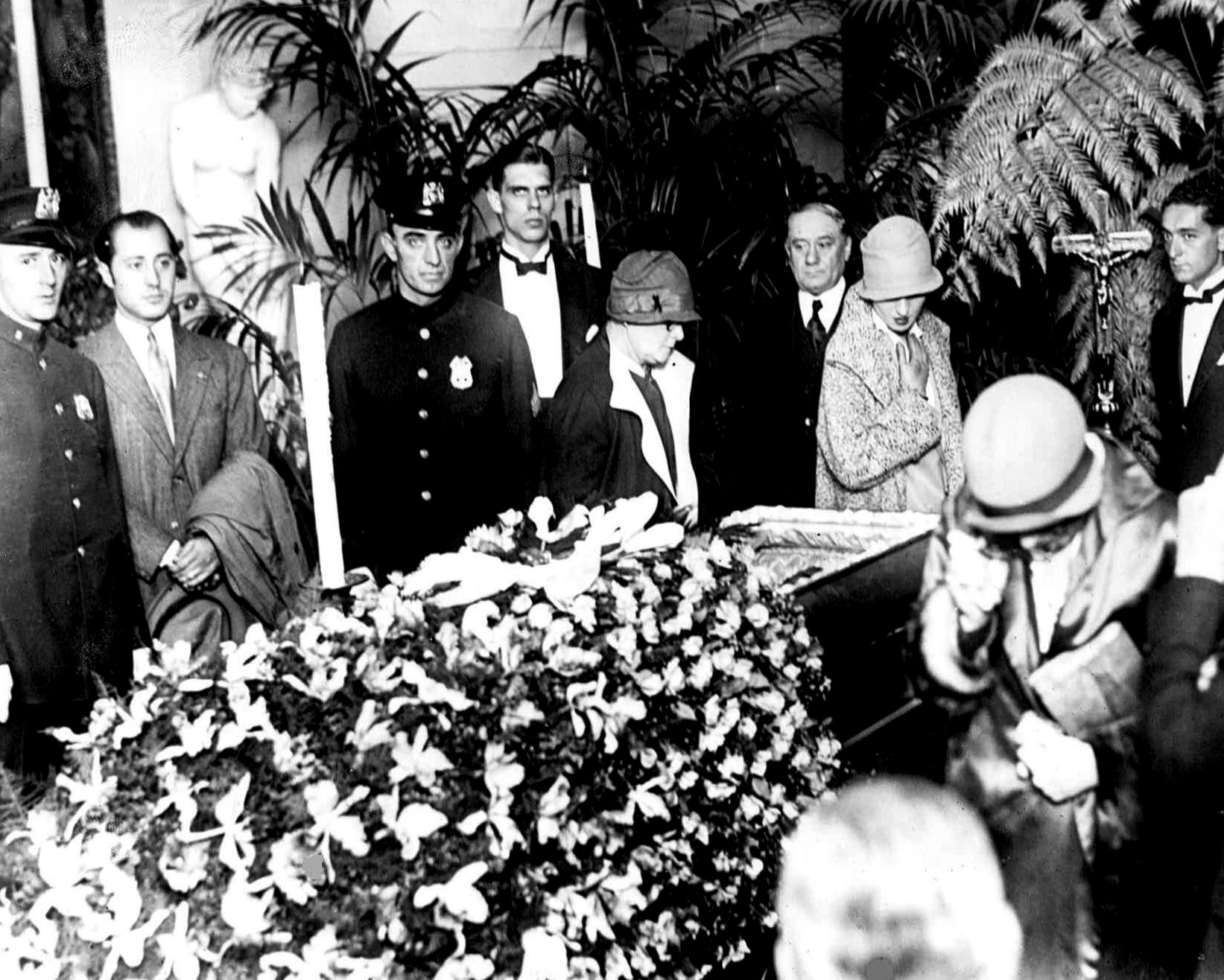
Acker (on the right) paying respects to Valentino, accompanied by her mother, Martha Acker, and her sister, Edith Acker, in 1926

Under U.S. law in 1919, American women who married non-citizens automatically lost their United States citizenship, and as a result, Acker forfeited her nationality upon marriage. She did not regain her American citizenship until 1922, after changes to the law under the Cable Act and three years after her divorce.

In 1922, Valentino did not wait the requisite period for their divorce to be finalized before marrying his second wife, Natacha Rambova, in Mexico, and was charged with bigamy when the couple returned to the United States. In 1923, Acker sued Valentino for the legal right to call herself Mrs. Rudolph Valentino. Valentino was angry with her for several years, but they mended their friendship in 1926 after his second divorce. Following his death, Acker wrote a popular song about him called "We Will Meet at the End of the Trail".

In the 1977 film Valentino a character loosely based on Acker is played by Carol Kane. In the credits, the character is simply called Starlet.

=== Relationships ===
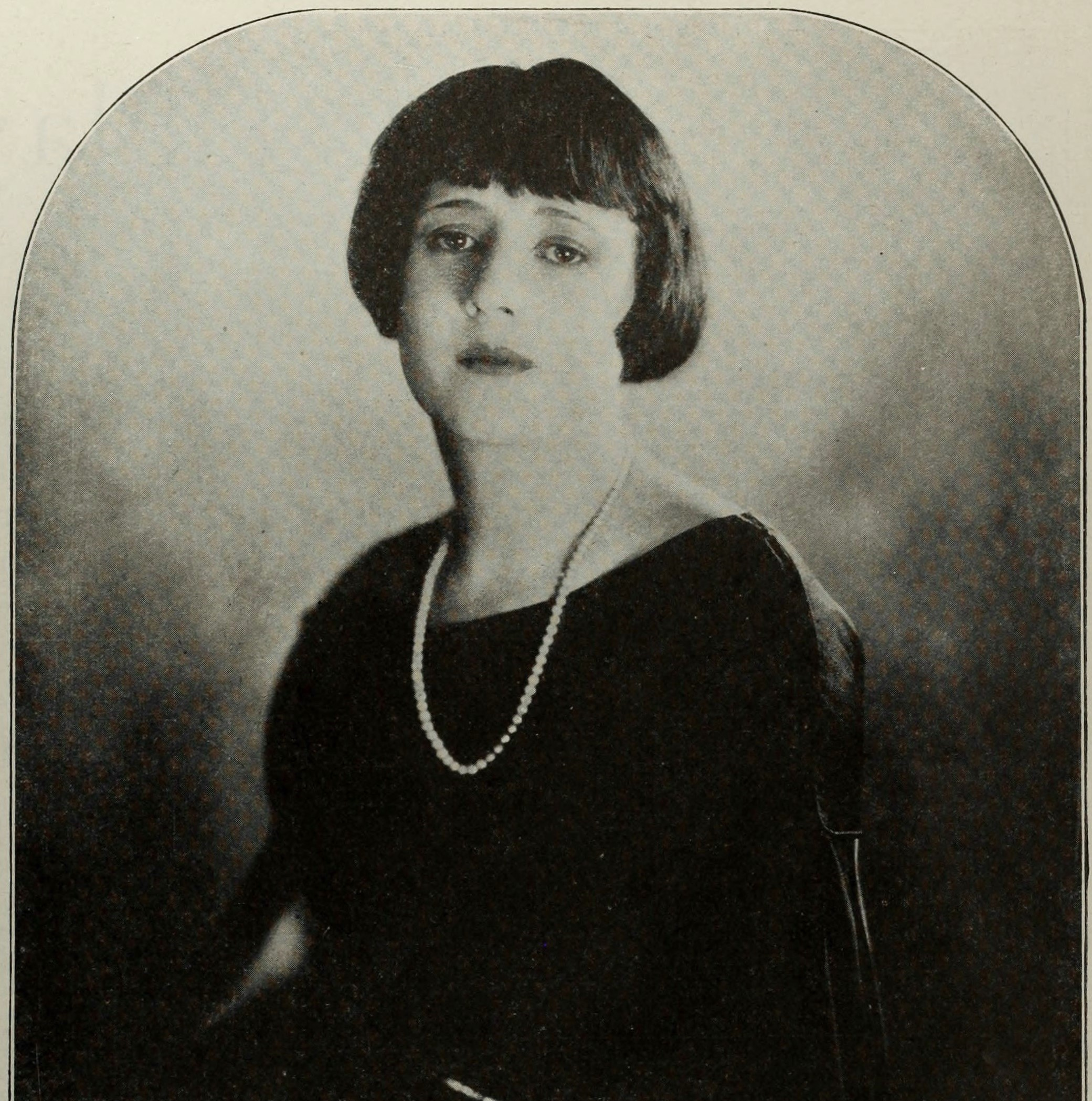
Acker photographed by James Abbe in Photoplay, November 1922

Russian actress Alla Nazimova included Acker in what was dubbed the Sewing Circle, a group of actresses forced to conceal the fact that they were lesbian or bisexual. Acker was involved with Canadian actress Grace Darmond during her relationship to Valentino.

After her divorce from Valentino, Acker was engaged to Marquis Luis de Bezan y Sandoval of Spain. Then, she was in the news over her relationship with Rahmin Bey. In 1930, after she lost her fortune in the 1929 stock market crash, she sued William Delahanty, claiming that he agreed to pay her $18,400 per year if she gave up her film career. The married politician denied that he made such a promise but admitted that he spent thousands of dollars on Acker.

Acker met Chloe Carter (June 21, 1903 – October 28, 1993), a former Ziegfeld Follies girl, who was the first wife of film composer Harry Ruby. Acker remained with Carter for the rest of her life. The couple owned an apartment building together in Beverly Hills.

== Death ==
Acker died of natural causes in 1978 at the age of 85, and is buried next to Carter at the Holy Cross Cemetery in Culver City, California.

== Legacy ==
Although not born in the Central Pennsylvania town of Lewistown, Jean Acker is considered a local celebrity. Her face dominates an outdoor mural titled "Mifflin County Movie History" and is located on Monument Square in Downtown Lewistown. The mural was painted in 2012 by Dwight Kirkland of Blackleaf Studio, Mifflintown, Pennsylvania.

== Filmography ==
Jean Acker filmography
Year	Title	Role	Notes	Ref(s)
1913	The Man Outside	Helen Lattimore	Short; Lost film	
1913	In a Woman's Power	Marcelle – the Wife	Lost film	
1913	Bob's Baby	Bob's Cousin	Short; Lost film	
1913	The Daredevil Mountaineer		Short; Lost film	
1914	The $5,000,000 Counterfeiting Plot	Helen Long	Dramascope Co. Lost film	
1915	Are You a Mason?		Alternative title: The Joiner; Famous Players Film Company; Lost film	
1919	Never Say Quit	Vamp	Fox Film; Lost film	
1919	Checkers	Pert Barlow	Fox Film; Lost film	
1919	Lombardi, Ltd.	Daisy	Metro Pictures	
1919	The Blue Bandanna	Ruth Yancy	Jesse D. Hampton Productions; Lost film	
1920	The Ladder of Lies	Dora Leroy	Famous Players–Lasky Corp. Lost film	
1920	An Arabian Knight	Zorah	Haworth Pictures Corp. Lost film	
1920	Help Wanted – Male	Ethel	Jesse D. Hampton Productions; Lost film	
1920	The Round-Up	Polly Hope	Famous Players–Lasky Corp.	
1921	See My Lawyer	Betty Gardner	Christie Film Company; Lost film	
1921	Brewster's Millions	Barbara Drew	Famous Players–Lasky Corp. Lost film	
1921	Wealth	Estelle Rolland	Famous Players–Lasky Corp. Lost film	
1921	The Kiss	Isabella Chavez	Universal Pictures; Lost film	
1922	Her Own Money	Ruth Alden	Famous Players–Lasky Corp. Lost film	
1923	The Woman in Chains	Felicia Coudret	Credited as Mrs. Rudolph Valentino; Amalgamated Producing Corp.	
1925	Braveheart	Sky-Arrow	Cinema Corp. of America	
1926	The Ace of Cads		Rumored to be cast, but no show Famous Players–Lasky Corp. Lost film	
1927	The Nest	Belle Madison	Excellent Pictures Corp.	
1933	No Marriage Ties	Adrienne's Maid	Listed in pre-production notes only	
1934	Miss Fane's Baby Is Stolen	Friend of Miss Fane	Uncredited; Paramount Pictures	
1935	The Lone Wolf Returns	Unknown	Billed as Jean Acker Valentino; Columbia Pictures	
1935	It's in the Air		Rumored to be cast, but no show MGM	
1936	San Francisco		Rumored to be cast, but no show MGM	
1937	Vogues of 1938	Extra	Uncredited	
1939	Good Girls Go to Paris	Bit Part	Uncredited	
1940	My Favorite Wife	Postponed case witness	Uncredited; RKO Pictures	
1942	Obliging Young Lady	Cousin	Uncredited; RKO Pictures	
1945	The Thin Man Goes Home	Tart	Uncredited; MGM	
1945	The Stork Club	Saleslady	DeSylva Productions, Inc.	
1945	Spellbound	Matron	Selznick International Pictures	
1946	It's a Wonderful Life	Townswoman	Uncredited; Liberty Films	
1947	The Peril of Pauline	Switchboard operator	Uncredited; Paramount	
1948	Isn't It Romantic?	Townswoman	Uncredited; Paramount	
1951	The Mating Season	Party guest	Uncredited; Paramount	
1952	Something to Live For	Wife	Uncredited; Paramount	
1955	How to Be Very, Very Popular	Minor Role	Rumored to be cast, but no show 20th Century Fox	
