= The Man Outside (1913 film) =

- Starring: Jean Acker
- Release date: February 6, 1913 (U.S.)
- Running time: 1 reel (approximately 10 minutes)
- Country: United States
- Language: Silent

The Man Outside is a 1913 comedy film.

== Cast ==
Actor/Actress	Role
William E. Shay	Reginald Jones
Jean Acker	Helen Lattimore
William Welsh	Professor Lattimore
