= River House (Virginia) =

Historic house in Virginia, United States

- U.S. National Register of Historic Places
- U.S. Historic district – Contributing property
- Virginia Landmarks Register
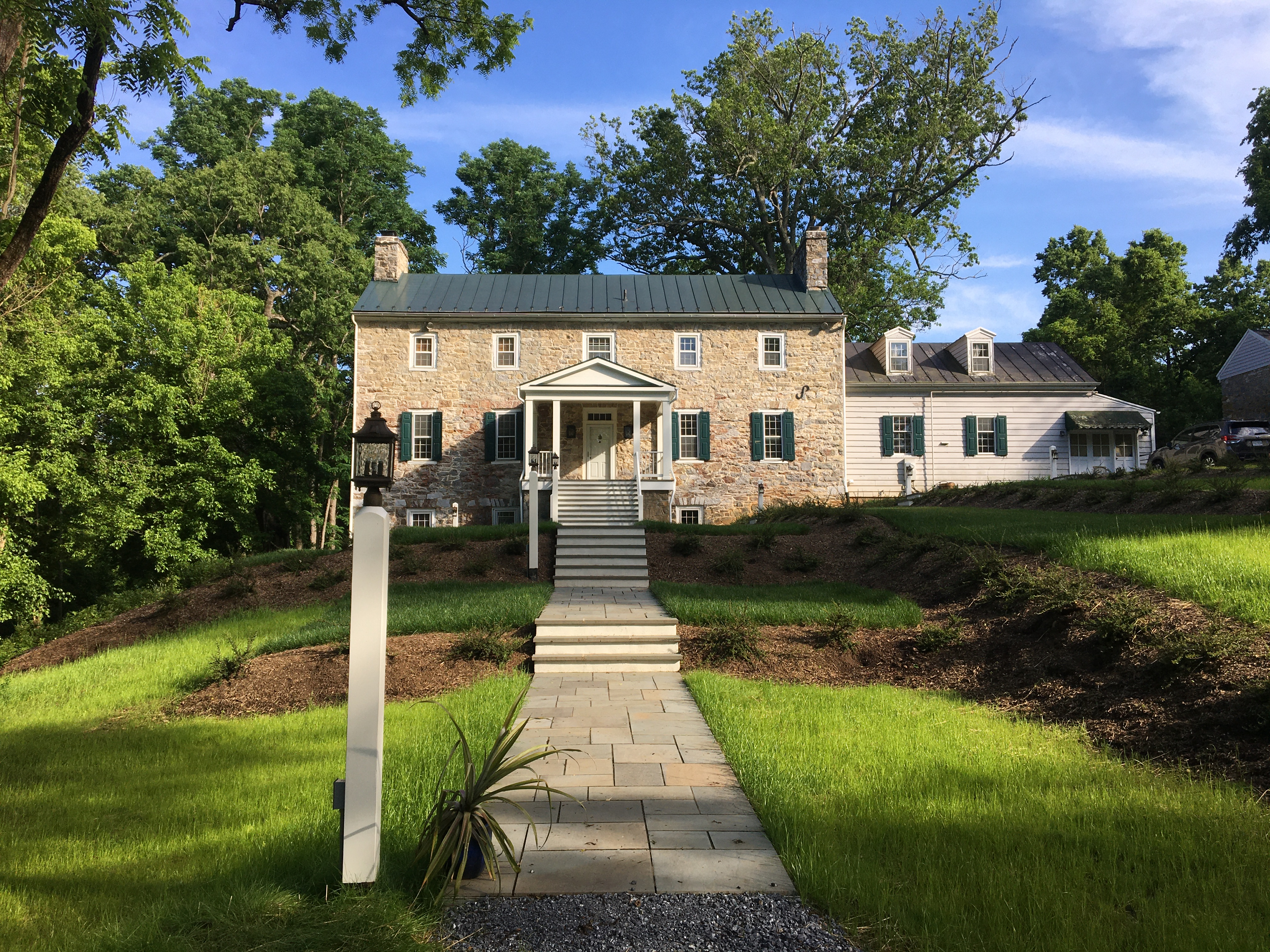

- Location within Northern Virginia Location within Virginia Location within the United States
- Location: US 17/50, 2.5 mi. E of Millwood, near Millwood, Virginia
- Coordinates: 39°02′26″N 78°00′09″W
- Area: 17 acres (6.9 ha)
- Built: c. 1820
- Architectural style: Early Republic, Vernacular Federal
- Part of: Greenway Historic District (ID93001133)
- NRHP reference No.: 93001440
- VLR No.: 021-0064

Significant dates
- Added to NRHP: December 23, 1993
- Designated CP: November 4, 1993
- Designated VLR: October 20, 1993

River House, also known as The Ferry Farm, is a historic plantation house located near Millwood, Clarke County, Virginia. It was built about 1820, and is a two-story, five-bay, rubble limestone dwelling in a vernacular Federal-style. It has a gable roof with wide interior-end chimneys. Also on the property is a rare three-part slave or servants' house and an early smokehouse.

It was listed on the National Register of Historic Places in 1993. It is located in the Greenway Historic District.

== See also ==
- National Register of Historic Places listings in Clarke County, Virginia
