= Illawalla =

Edwardian mansion in Lancashire, England

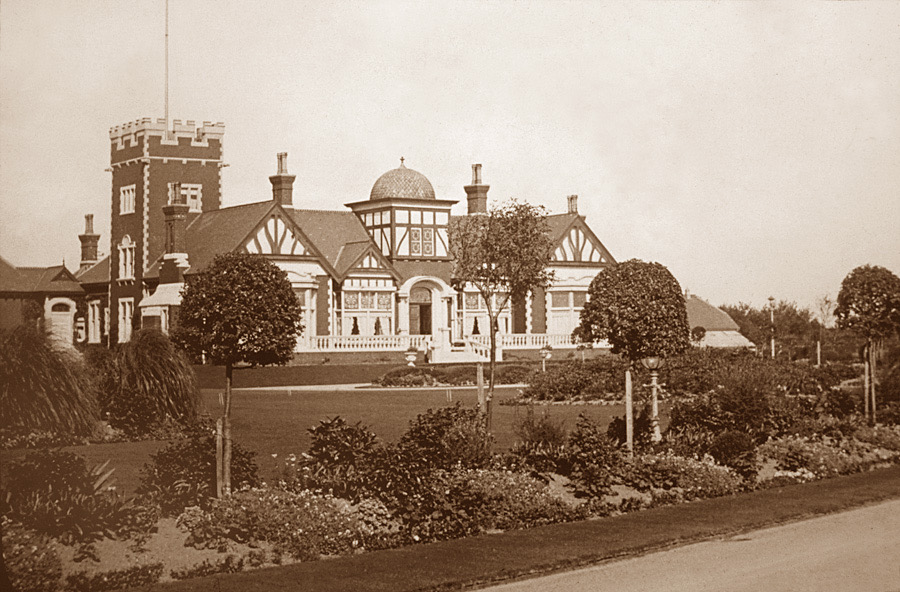
- Pictured around 1903 from its driveway, looking northeast
- Interactive map of the Illawalla area

General information
- Architectural style: Edwardian
- Location: Skippool, Skippool Road, Thornton, Lancashire, United Kingdom
- Coordinates: 53.8615°N 2.9826°W
- Completed: 1902
- Demolished: 1996

Height
- Height: 56 feet (top of tower)

Design and construction
- Architects: Fairbrother & Hall; Bank Chambers, Market Place, Poulton-le-Fylde

Illawalla was an Edwardian building in the Skippool area of Thornton, Lancashire, England. Built in 1902, it was demolished in 1996, after lying derelict for six years, to make way for three exclusive homes. Its name is preserved in the name of the road on which these houses now stand (The Illawalla) and also in the name of the adjacent cricket club (Thornton Cleveleys Cricket Club Illawalla), whose grounds partly occupy the land Illawalla stood on.

Illawalla in Aboriginal Australian means the house of plenty. It is believed James Frederick Emery, one of the early owners of the property, gave it this name to reflect his spell as a government official in Australia.

== History ==
Illawalla's architects were Tom Wilson Fairbrother and Charles Llewelyn Hall, of Fairbrother & Hall in Poulton-le-Fylde.

The building's foundation stone was laid by Vesta Tilley on 12 June 1902. Tilley was appearing at Blackpool's Alhambra Theatre, whose chairman was Charles V. Howarth, the Illawalla's first owner. Upon completion, it was the largest bungalow in Europe.

According to a Blackpool Times article from 21 June 1902:

The plan shows a large entrance hall on the south side opening on to a dining saloon 56ft. by 35ft. (including corridor) from which access is gained to the reception rooms, bedrooms, billiard room, etc., and also to a tower 56ft. high. A special feature of the drawing room will be a large inglenook. The coachman's cottage, stables, loose boxes, dynamo and accumulator house, etc., are all arranged on the north side. The building will present a very pleasing and picturesque appearance, as the exterior walls are to be faced with Huncoat plastic bricks, with Yorkshire stone dressings, and the roofs are to be covered with red tiles. The premises will be lighted throughout with the electric light, and will be heated with hot water by means of radiators.

One of the rooms featured a plaster frieze depicting wading birds along the nearby River Wyre.

Haworth lived with his wife at Illawalla up to his death in 1920. His widow continued to live there for several subsequent years.

It was next acquired by Ernest Broadbelt, a wholesale fruit merchant from Manchester. He was its owner during the late 1920s and 1930s.

In 1942, it was bought by James Frederick Emery, but he was unable to move into the building for three years because it was being used by the British Army as a transit camp. It was later taken over by the Home Guard. Later in World War II it became a home run by the Ministry of Health for pregnant evacuees. In the early 1950s, Emery leased the land overlooking the River Wyre to the local cricket club, who remain there today.

David Taylor, grandson of Emery, grew up at Illawalla. He documents this period, and other parts of his life, in his 2020 book, Beloved Ghosts. In it, he reveals that his mother, Margaret, was murdered by his father, RC Taylor.

Several of the interior scenes for the 1977 film Valentino were shot in Illawalla's sunken entrance hall.

For the final years of its existence, after failing in an attempt to become a gentlemen's club, it instead became a nightclub.

Emmanuel Christian School in Fleetwood inquired about taking over Illawalla in 1995, but Wyre Borough Council rejected the plan amid fears of the close proximity of an underground pipeline carrying ethylene to ICI Hillhouse in Thornton.

The building was demolished in April 1996, after lying derelict for six years, to make way for three luxury homes. Only two carved stone pillars remain on the site. They are used at the entrance to the current development. Many parts of the building were salvaged and are now used privately.

== References in popular culture ==
Glyn Bailey & the Many Splendid Things wrote "The Old Illawalla" about the building. It is the opening track on the 2010 album The Disturbance. The opening line of the song is: "There once stood, at the edge of town, an Edwardian pile of great renown, but in '96 we pulled it down". Three years earlier, Bailey released an album called Songs from the Old Illawalla.

== Gallery ==
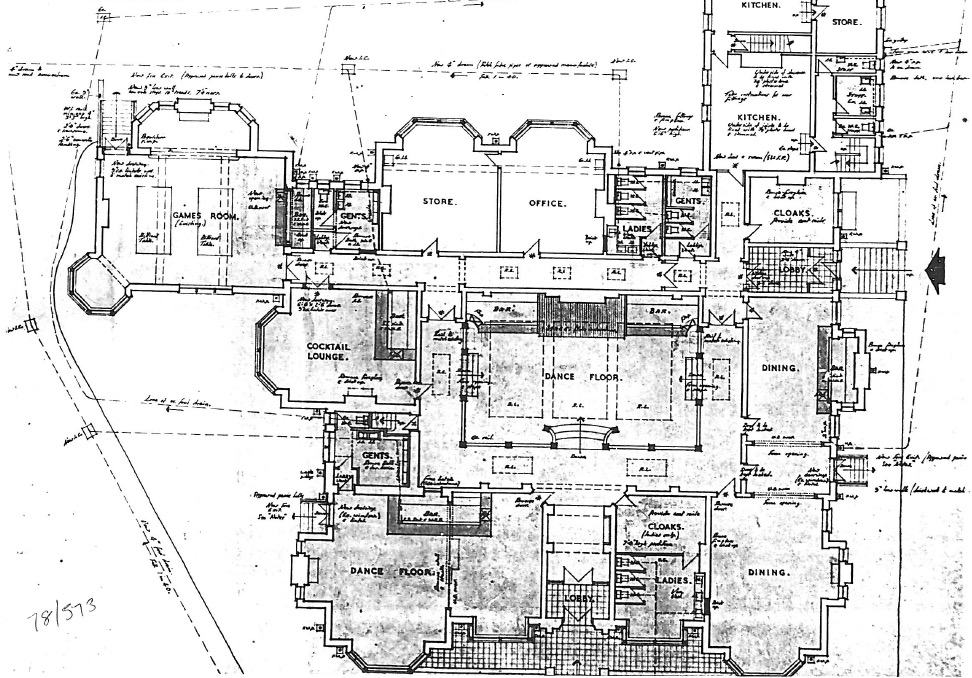
Floor plan of Illawalla, drawn up by the architects Fairbrother & Hall

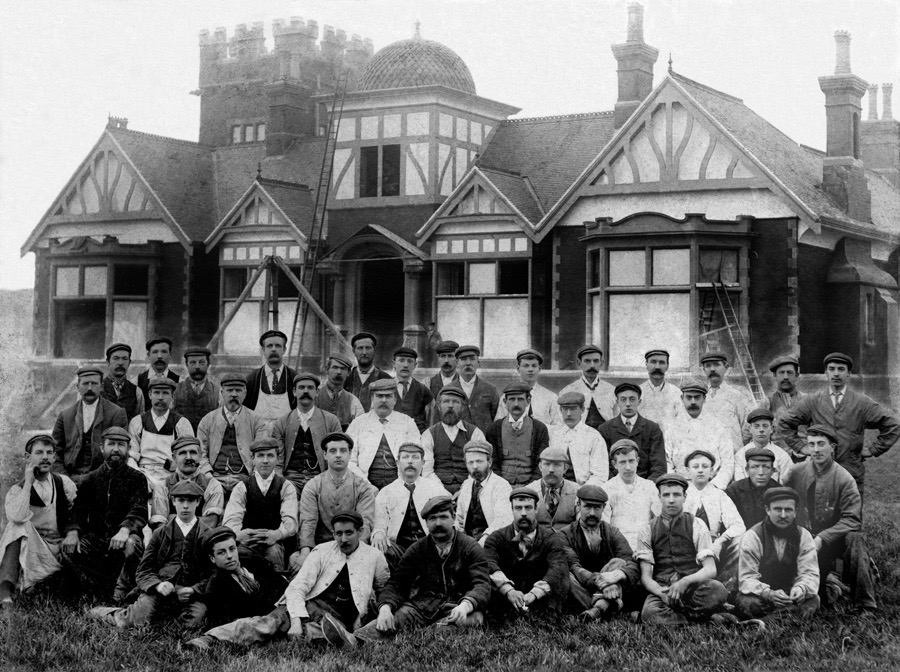
The workmen involved in the construction of Illawalla, taken shortly before its 1902 completion

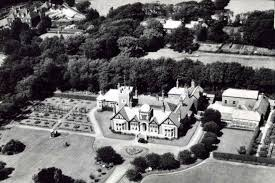
An aerial view of Illawalla in its heyday

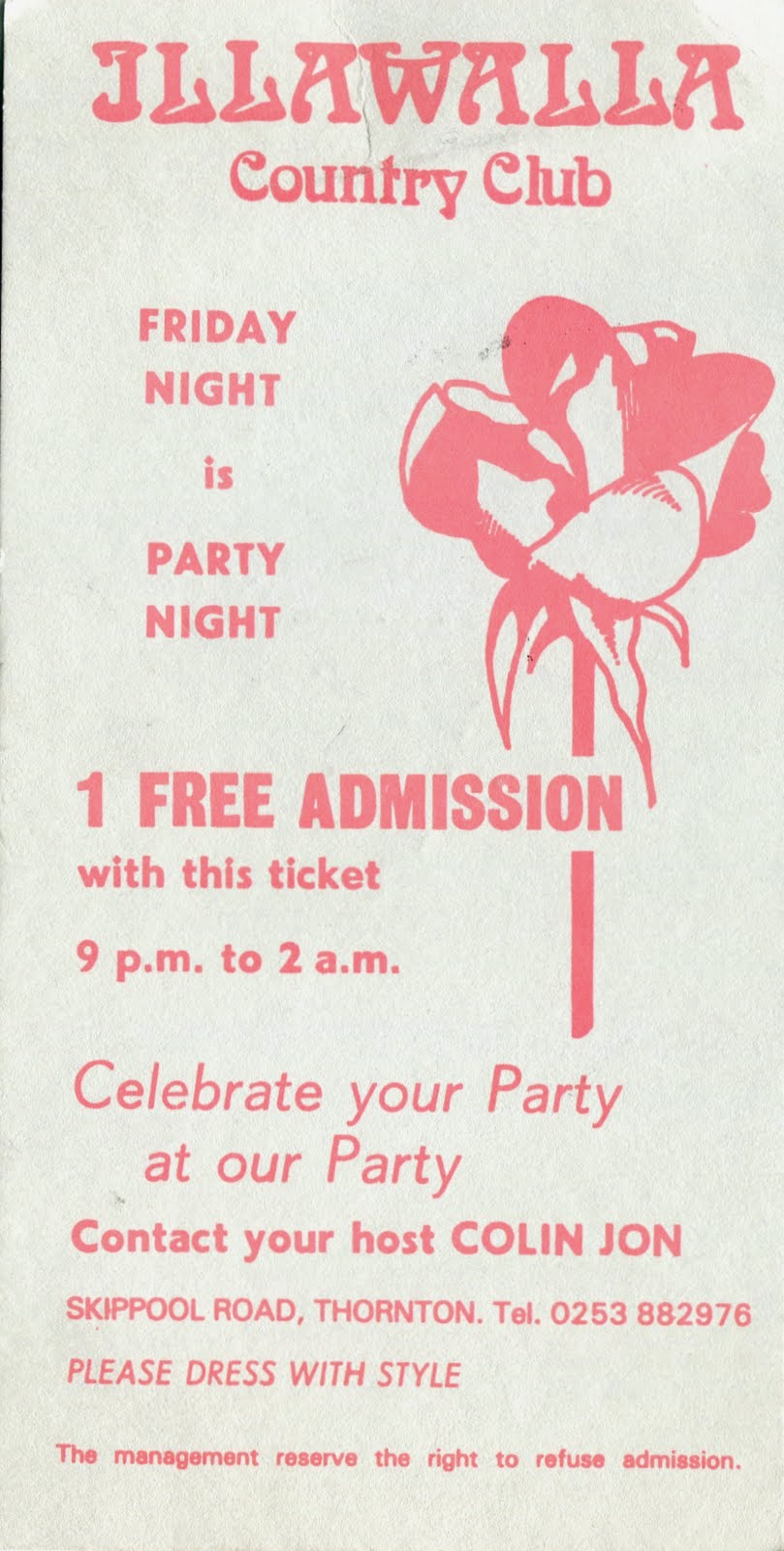
A free-admission ticket for a "Friday night party night" when the establishment was known as a country club in the late 1970s

One of the two stone pillars that mark the entrance to today's development

The homes that now stand in Illawalla's place in view behind Thornton Cleveleys Cricket Club. This view is looking west
