= Gracemount High School =

Coordinates: 55°54′15″N 3°09′07″W

Location
- 136 Lasswade Road; Gracemount; Edinburgh, EH16 6TZ; Scotland

Information
- Motto: Responsible, Respectful, Safe
- Established: 29 October 1959
- Department for Education URN: 5532930 Tables
- Headteacher: Ross Hunter
- Gender: Coeducational
- Age: 11 to 18
- Enrolment: 620
- Houses: Skye, Lewis, Tiree
- Colours: Red, yellow, green
- Website: https://www.gracemounthighschool.co.uk/

Gracemount High School (GHS) is a non-denominational six-year comprehensive secondary school serving south-east Edinburgh, Scotland. It has a current roll of over 600 pupils and around 80 staff. It is operated by City of Edinburgh Council, the local education authority. No current inspection report is available and it was last inspected in 2013.

League tables, published in 2019, ranking the percentage of pupils attaining five or more awards at SCQF Level 6 (Scottish Higher) in 2019, placed Gracemount High at 331 out of 339 schools with 13 per cent; the Scottish Government benchmark figure for GHS was 22. The Scottish Government's school information dashboard for Gracemount High shows attainment levels at SCQF Level 3 in S3 at over 90 per cent for reading and listening and talking in 2018–19; 73 per cent of pupils leave with at least one award at SCQF level 5 or better.

== History ==
=== Old building ===
The original school building was opened on 29 October 1959 as a junior secondary school and became a six-year comprehensive school in the 1960s. In 2000, with the school in a very poor state and needing repairs, Edinburgh Council decided that the cost of repairing the building was too great, and that creating a new building would be a more viable solution.

Before the original school building closed and was then demolished in 2003, ex-teaching staff and students gathered for a party to mark the end of the original school building which stood for over forty years.

=== New building ===
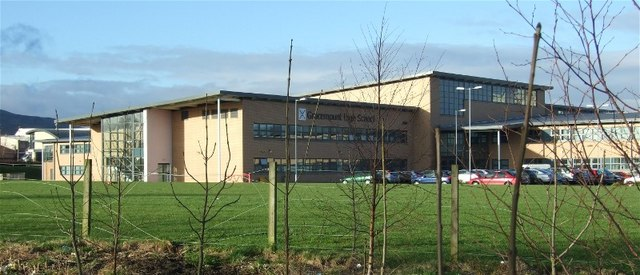
The new school

Pupils and staff moved into the new building in August 2003. It is located adjacent to Captain's Road, and to where the old school formerly stood. The functional design has a central hall with classroom wings leading off.

The building was created under a public-private partnership (PPP) scheme by Edinburgh Schools Partnership (ESP). Gracemount was one of several 21st-century school buildings in Edinburgh found to be defective. The schools had all been built by Miller Construction, which was acquired by Galliford Try in 2014. Construction expert Prof John Cole published a damning report into the scandal in 2017. Following this the ESP agreed to pay for all structural repair work (Nov 2018).

== Cycling event ==
The school was the halfway point for the 2017 London–Edinburgh–London cycle ride.
