= Outside Man =

Outside Man may refer to:

- The Outside Man, a 1972 French film
- The Outside Man, a 1981 novel by Richard North Patterson
- "Outside Man" (CSI: NY), an episode of CSI: NY

== See also ==
- The Man Outside
