= The River House =

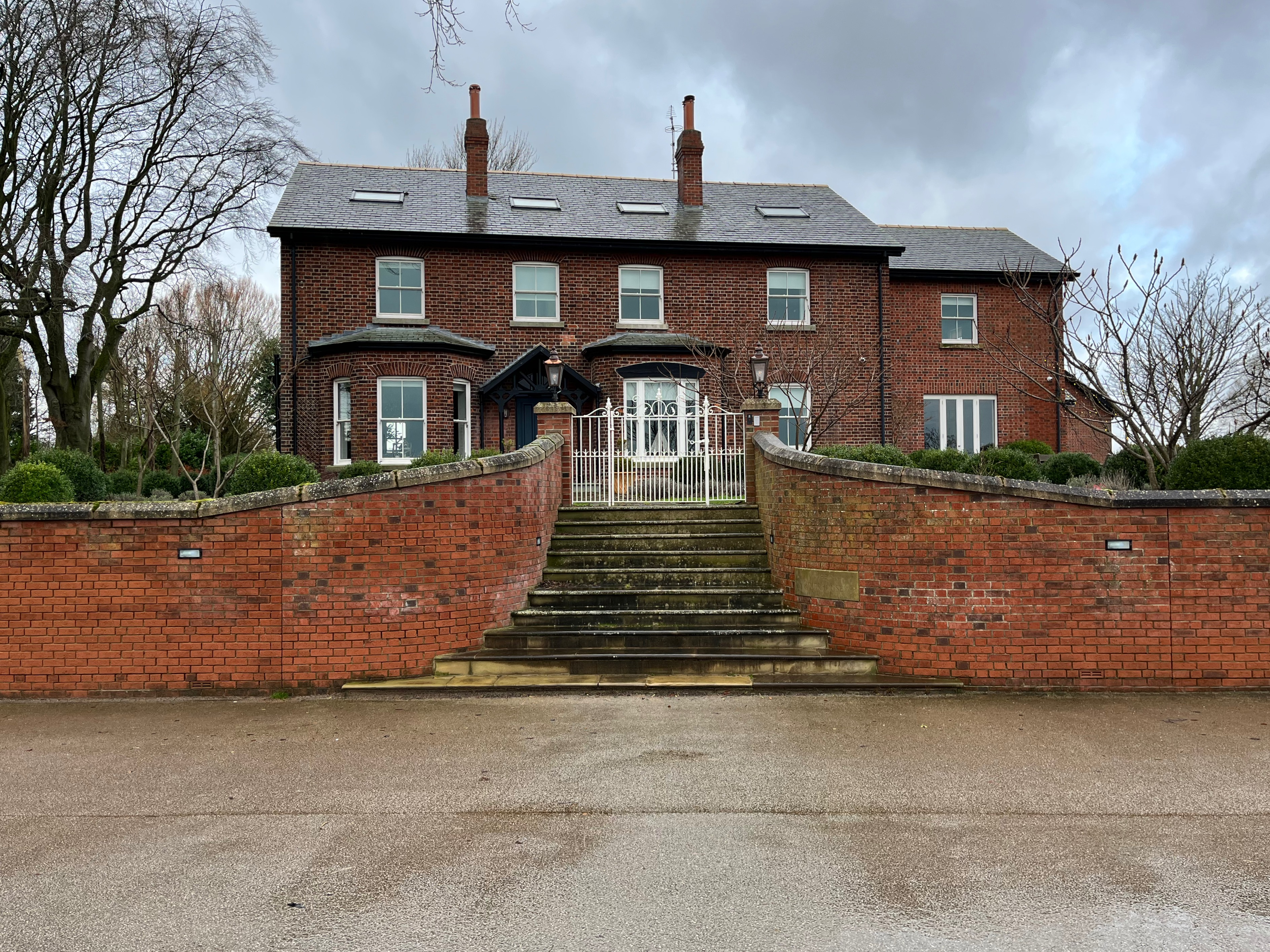
- The building in 2023

- Location within the Borough of Wyre
- Interactive map of the The River House area
- Former names: Wyre Bank; Wyre Bank Hotel and Restaurant; River House Restaurant

General information
- Architectural style: Victorian
- Location: Skippool, 11 Wyre Road, Thornton, Lancashire, United Kingdom
- Coordinates: 53.862547°N 2.978312°W
- Completed: 1830 (196 years ago)

Technical details
- Floor count: 2

The River House is a historic building in the Skippool area of Thornton-Cleveleys, Lancashire, England. Overlooking the River Wyre, it was built in 1830, originally known as Wyre Bank, later becoming Wyre Bank Hotel and Restaurant. After two further renamings, firstly to The River House, then The River House Restaurant, in 1958, it was frequented by the likes of Rudolf Nureyev, George Harrison and prominent politicians and was run by members of the Scott family. It has also been a four-guestroom hotel.

Bill and Linda Scott ran the hotel for over thirty years, before selling it in 2005.

British Prime Ministers Edward Heath, Margaret Thatcher and Tony Blair stayed at the property during the Tory Party Conferences that were held in Blackpool. John Prescott has also stayed at The River House.

Today it is a private residence, with an addition on the northern side of the property.

== Gallery ==
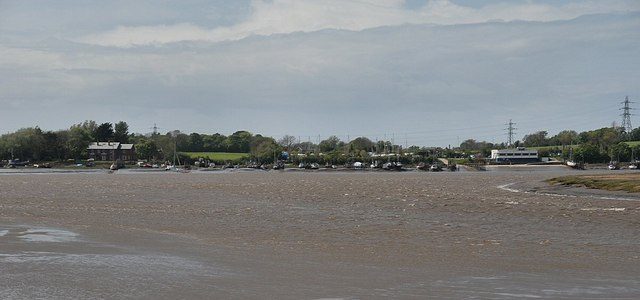
River House is in view on the left of this photo taken from Shard Bridge in 2009
