= National Register of Historic Places listings in Clarke County, Virginia =

Location of Clarke County in Virginia

This is a list of the National Register of Historic Places listings in Clarke County, Virginia.

This is intended to be a complete list of the properties and districts on the National Register of Historic Places in Clarke County, Virginia, United States. The locations of National Register properties and districts for which the latitude and longitude coordinates are included below, may be seen in an online map.

There are 41 properties and districts listed on the National Register in the county, including 2 National Historic Landmarks.

This National Park Service list is complete through NPS recent listings posted May 1, 2026.

== Current listings ==
| | Name on the Register | Image | Date listed | Location | City or town | Description |
|---|---|---|---|---|---|---|
| 1 | Annefield | Annefield | November 12, 1969 (#69000231) | East of the junction of Annfield and Summerville Rds. 39°07′35″N 78°01′40″W | Boyce | |
| 2 | Bear's Den Rural Historic District | Bear's Den Rural Historic District | May 14, 2009 (#08001112) | Generally runs along both side of the ridge along parts of Raven Rocks and Blue Ridge Mountain Rds. 39°06′40″N 77°51′15″W | Bluemont | |
| 3 | Berryville Historic District | Berryville Historic District | November 3, 1987 (#87001881) | Junction of U.S. Route 340, State Route 7, and Main, Church, and Buckmarsh Sts. 39°09′04″N 77°58′53″W | Berryville | |
| 4 | Bethel Memorial Church | Bethel Memorial Church | February 7, 1991 (#89001927) | Swift Shoals Rd. 39°01′46″N 78°02′47″W | White Post | |
| 5 | Blandy Experimental Farm Historic District | Blandy Experimental Farm Historic District | November 12, 1992 (#92001580) | Southern side of U.S. Routes 17/50, 4 miles (6.4 km) west of the Shenandoah River; 39°03′50″N 78°03′55″W | Boyce | |
| 6 | Boyce Historic District | Boyce Historic District | March 8, 2004 (#04000155) | Includes Crescent Sts., Greenway Ave., Huntingdon Ln., Main St., Old Chapel Ave., Railroad Ln., and Saratoga, Virginia, and Whiting; 39°05′36″N 78°03′36″W | Boyce | |
| 7 | Burwell-Morgan Mill | Burwell-Morgan Mill | November 12, 1969 (#69000233) | At the junction of State Route 255 with Millwood Rd. 39°04′08″N 78°02′17″W | Millwood | |
| 8 | Carter Hall | Carter Hall | July 24, 1973 (#73002003) | Northeast of Millwood off State Route 255; 39°04′15″N 78°01′49″W | Millwood | |
| 9 | Chapel Hill | Chapel Hill | December 30, 2004 (#04000846) | 300 Chapel Hill Ln. 39°06′46″N 78°00′59″W | Berryville | |
| 10 | Chapel Rural Historic District | Chapel Rural Historic District | February 14, 2014 (#14000010) | Generally centered along U.S. Route 340; 39°05′30″N 78°01′21″W | Millwood | |
| 11 | Cleridge | Cleridge | September 8, 2011 (#11000653) | 1649 Old Charles Town Rd. 39°13′26″N 78°03′32″W | Stephenson | Extends into Frederick County |
| 12 | Clermont | Clermont | July 27, 2005 (#05000767) | 801 E. Main St. 39°08′32″N 77°57′50″W | Berryville | |
| 13 | Cool Spring Battlefield | Cool Spring Battlefield | June 6, 1997 (#97000492) | Junction of State Route 7 and the Shenandoah River; 39°07′30″N 77°53′24″W | Berryville | |
| 14 | Fairfield | Fairfield | February 26, 1970 (#70000787) | East of the junction of U.S. Route 340 and Clifton Rd. 39°11′05″N 77°56′07″W | Berryville | |
| 15 | Farnley | Farnley | November 2, 1989 (#89001914) | Sugar Hill Rd. and Bordens Spring Rd. 39°01′21″N 78°06′57″W | White Post | |
| 16 | Glendale Farm | Glendale Farm | March 17, 1995 (#95000244) | Northern side of the junction of Old Charles Town and Crum Church Rds. 39°13′42″N 78°00′42″W | Berryville | |
| 17 | Greenway Court | Greenway Court | October 15, 1966 (#66000829) | 1 mile (1.6 km) south of White Post on State Route 277; 39°02′48″N 78°07′09″W | White Post | Remnants of 5,000,000-acre (20,000 km^{2}) estate of Thomas Fairfax, 6th Lord Fairfax of Cameron, only British peer in America, where George Washington worked as a surveyor |
| 18 | Greenway Historic District | Greenway Historic District | November 4, 1993 (#93001133) | Roughly bounded by the Shenandoah River, the Warren County line, U.S. Route 340, and Locke's Mill Rd.; also the eastern side of State Route 255, approximately 0.2 miles north of its junction with Millwood Rd.; also 14374 U.S. Route 340; 39°03′29″N 78°06′14″W | Boyce | Second set of boundaries and U.S. Route 340 represent boundary increases of February 21, 1997 and October 30, 2007 |
| 19 | Guilford | Guilford | February 4, 1993 (#93000004) | Southern side of Stone Bridge Rd., 0.5 miles (0.80 km) west of its junction with Sugar Hill Rd. 39°01′07″N 78°05′53″W | White Post | |
| 20 | Huntingdon | Huntingdon | May 25, 1979 (#79003035) | North of Boyce; 39°06′09″N 78°03′18″W | Boyce | |
| 21 | Josephine City Historic District | Josephine City Historic District | May 18, 2015 (#15000250) | Josephine St. 39°08′36″N 77°58′55″W | Berryville | |
| 22 | Josephine City School | Josephine City School | April 7, 1995 (#95000397) | 301-A Josephine St. 39°08′28″N 77°58′46″W | Berryville | |
| 23 | Locke's Mill | Locke's Mill | April 3, 2019 (#100003603) | 1600 Locke's Mill Rd. 39°06′08″N 77°58′20″W | Berryville | |
| 24 | Long Branch | Long Branch | October 1, 1969 (#69000232) | West of the junction of Bordens Spring and Red Gate Rds. 39°02′27″N 78°03′21″W | Millwood | |
| 25 | Long Marsh Run Rural Historic District | Long Marsh Run Rural Historic District | November 4, 1996 (#96001173) | Roughly bounded by the West Virginia state line, Wickliffe Rd., Shepherds Mill Rd., State Route 7, and Kimble Rd. 39°09′22″N 77°55′08″W | Berryville | |
| 26 | Lucky Hit | Lucky Hit | August 12, 1993 (#93000834) | Southern side of Berrys Ferry Rd., 4,500 feet (1,400 m) northeast of its junction with White Post Rd. 39°03′18″N 78°05′37″W | White Post | |
| 27 | Meadea | Meadea | February 8, 1995 (#95000022) | Southern side of Berrys Ferry Rd., 600 feet (180 m) east of its junction with White Post Rd. 39°03′25″N 78°06′07″W | White Post | |
| 28 | Millwood Colored School | Millwood Colored School | November 22, 2000 (#00001431) | 1610 Millwood Rd. 39°04′29″N 78°02′31″W | Boyce | |
| 29 | Millwood Commercial Historic District | Millwood Commercial Historic District | January 31, 2006 (#05001624) | Parts of Millwood Rd. and Tannery Ln. 39°04′11″N 78°02′17″W | Millwood | |
| 30 | Norwood | Norwood | September 30, 1994 (#94001180) | Southern side of State Route 7, 0.9 miles (1.4 km) east of its junction with State Route 7 Business; 39°08′22″N 77°57′00″W | Berryville | |
| 31 | Old Chapel | Old Chapel | April 2, 1973 (#73002004) | 3 miles (4.8 km) north of Millwood off U.S. Route 340; 39°06′27″N 78°00′51″W | Millwood | |
| 32 | Old Clarke County Courthouse | Old Clarke County Courthouse | July 7, 1983 (#83003277) | 104 N. Church St. 39°09′07″N 77°58′49″W | Berryville | |
| 33 | River House | River House | December 23, 1993 (#93001440) | U.S. Routes 17/50, 2.5 miles (4.0 km) east of Millwood; 39°02′32″N 78°00′06″W | Millwood | |
| 34 | Saratoga | Saratoga | February 26, 1970 (#70000788) | Millwood Rd. 39°05′00″N 78°03′36″W | Boyce | Gray limestone Georgian house built by Brig. Gen. Daniel Morgan, best known for his victory over the British at the Battle of Cowpens in 1781. |
| 35 | Scaleby | Scaleby | December 28, 1990 (#90002000) | Millwood Rd., south of its junction with U.S. Route 340; 39°05′12″N 78°02′55″W | Boyce | |
| 36 | Smithfield Farm | Smithfield Farm | February 16, 2001 (#01000148) | 568 Smithfield Ln. 39°10′24″N 77°53′58″W | Berryville | |
| 37 | Soldier's Rest | Soldier's Rest | May 23, 1996 (#96000579) | 0.3 miles (0.48 km) north of Fairfax Ave. and approximately 0.5 miles (0.80 km) east of the junction of U.S. Route 340 and State Route 7; 39°09′25″N 77°58′16″W | Berryville | |
| 38 | Stone's Chapel | Stone's Chapel | August 5, 2019 (#100004259) | 4138 Crums Church Rd. 39°13′37″N 78°00′37″W | Berryville | |
| 39 | The Tuleyries | The Tuleyries | August 7, 1972 (#72001388) | 1.5 miles (2.4 km) east of White Post off Berrys Ferry Rd. 39°03′57″N 78°04′12″W | White Post | |
| 40 | White Post Historic District | White Post Historic District | September 29, 1983 (#83003278) | Berrys Ferry and White Post Rds. 39°03′29″N 78°06′12″W | White Post | |
| 41 | Wickliffe Church | Wickliffe Church | March 17, 1995 (#95000241) | Eastern side of Wickliffe Rd., 0.5 miles (0.80 km) south of the West Virginia line 39°09′59″N 77°53′31″W | Berryville | |

== See also ==
- List of National Historic Landmarks in Virginia
- National Register of Historic Places listings in Virginia
