= Josephine City Historic District =

Historic district in Virginia, United States

- U.S. National Register of Historic Places
- U.S. Historic district
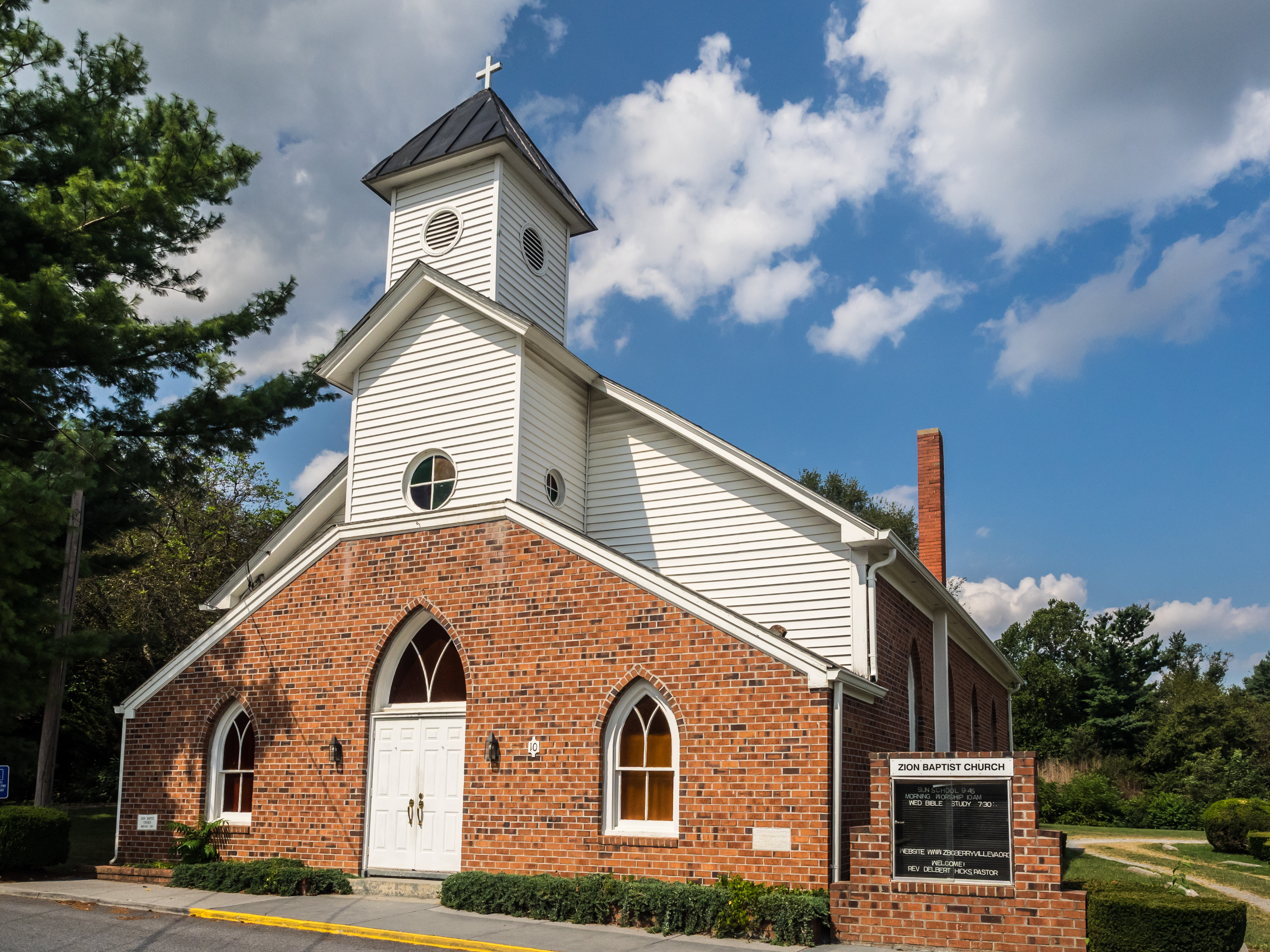
- Zion Baptist Church, August 2015

- Location within Northern Virginia Location within Virginia Location within the United States
- Location: Josephine Street, Berryville, Virginia
- Coordinates: 39°8′36″N 77°58′56″W
- Area: 40 acres (16 ha)
- Architect: Multiple
- Architectural style: Late 19th and early 20th century, log, frame, and brick veneer
- NRHP reference No.: 15000250
- Added to NRHP: May 18, 2015

Josephine City Historic District is a national historic district located on either side of Josephine Street in the southeast portion of the town of Berryville, Clarke County, Virginia. It encompasses 38 contributing buildings and 2 contributing sites on 40 acres of land. While most of the district is occupied by single-family dwellings, there are also a church, a parish hall, three former school buildings, and a cemetery. Located in the district and separately listed is the Josephine City School, which now houses the Josephine Community Museum.

Josephine City Historic District was listed on the National Register of Historic Places in May 2015.

A few of the contributing buildings and sites along Josephine Street

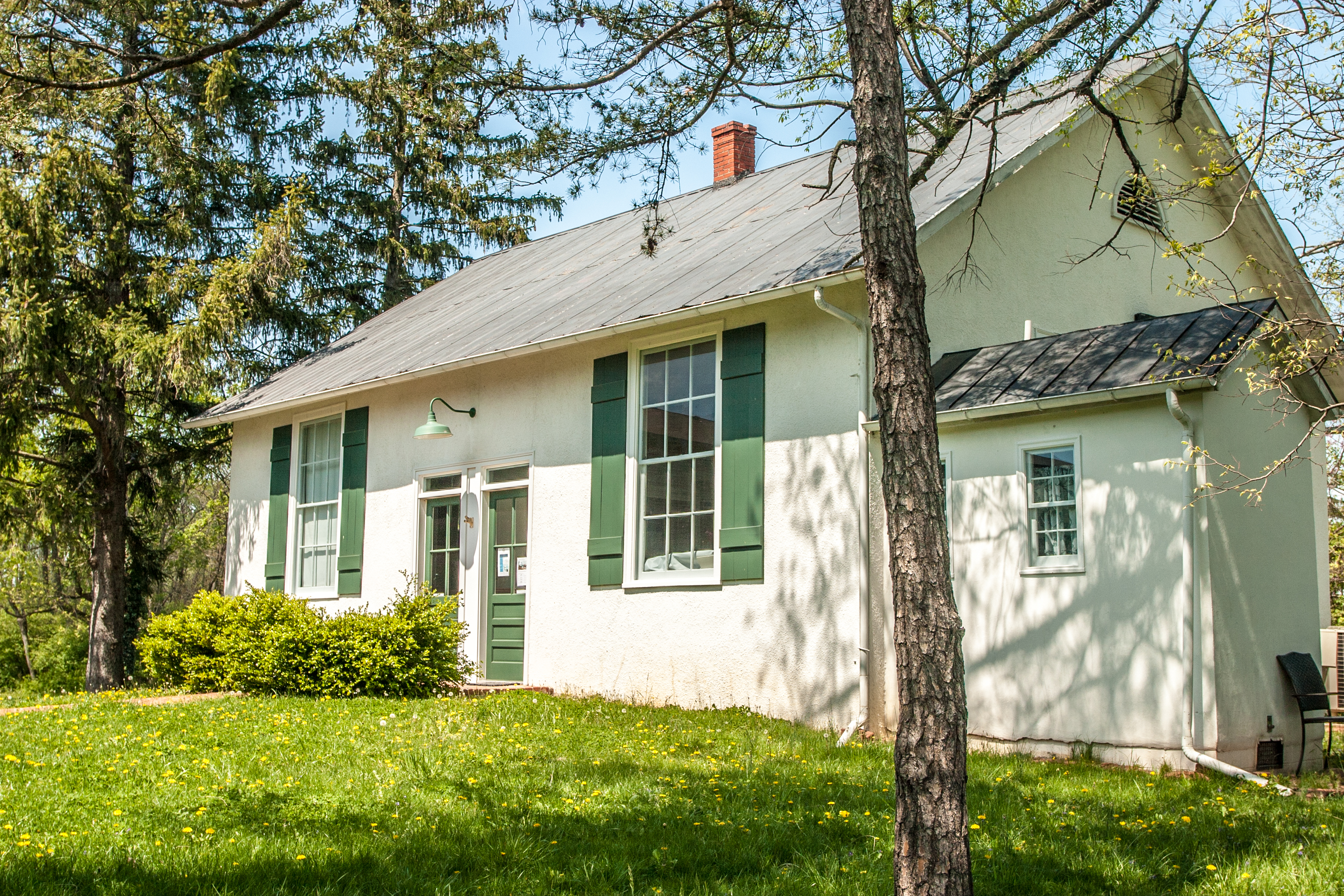
Josephine City School, now the Josephine Community Museum

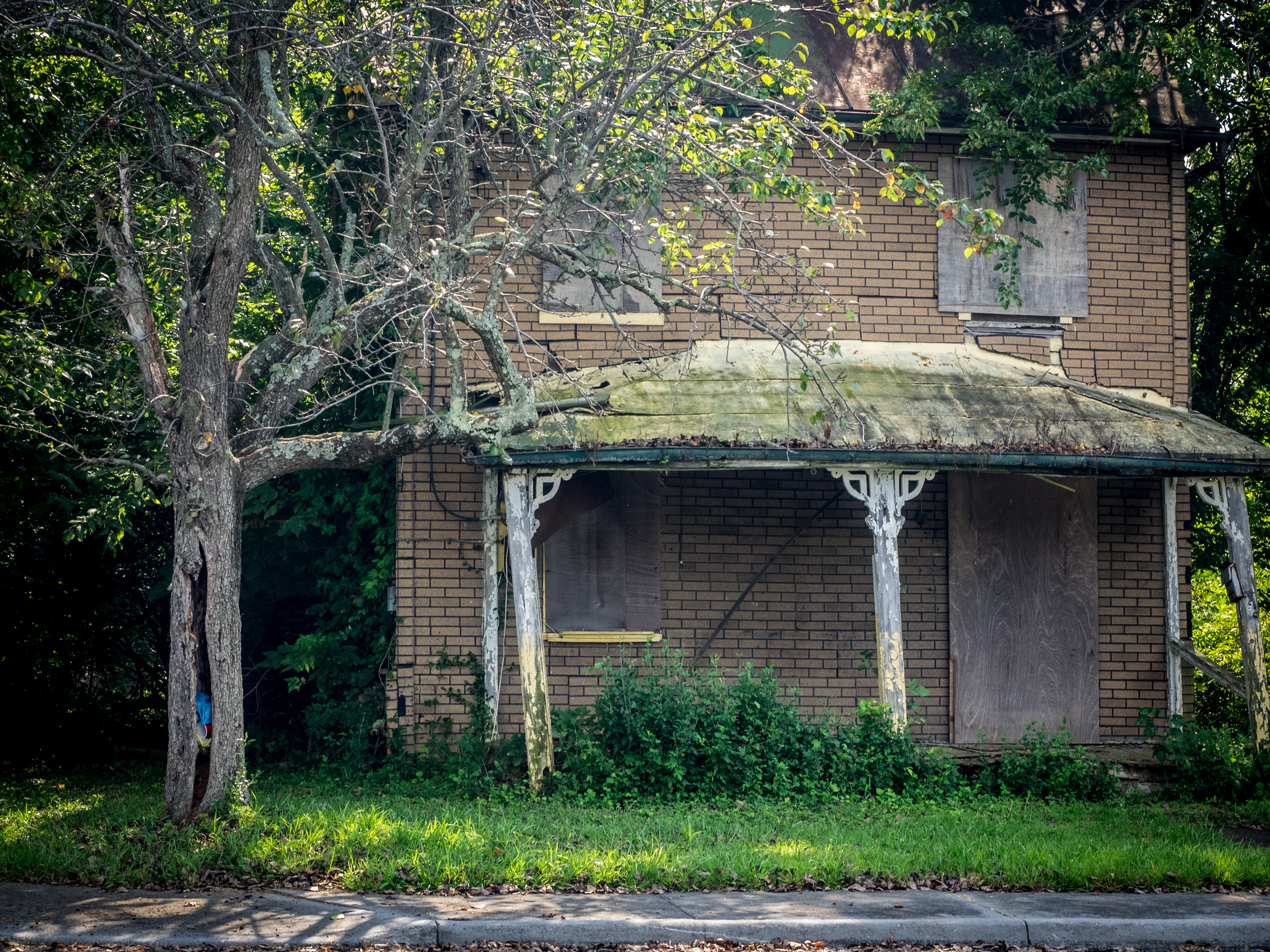
Abandoned dwelling

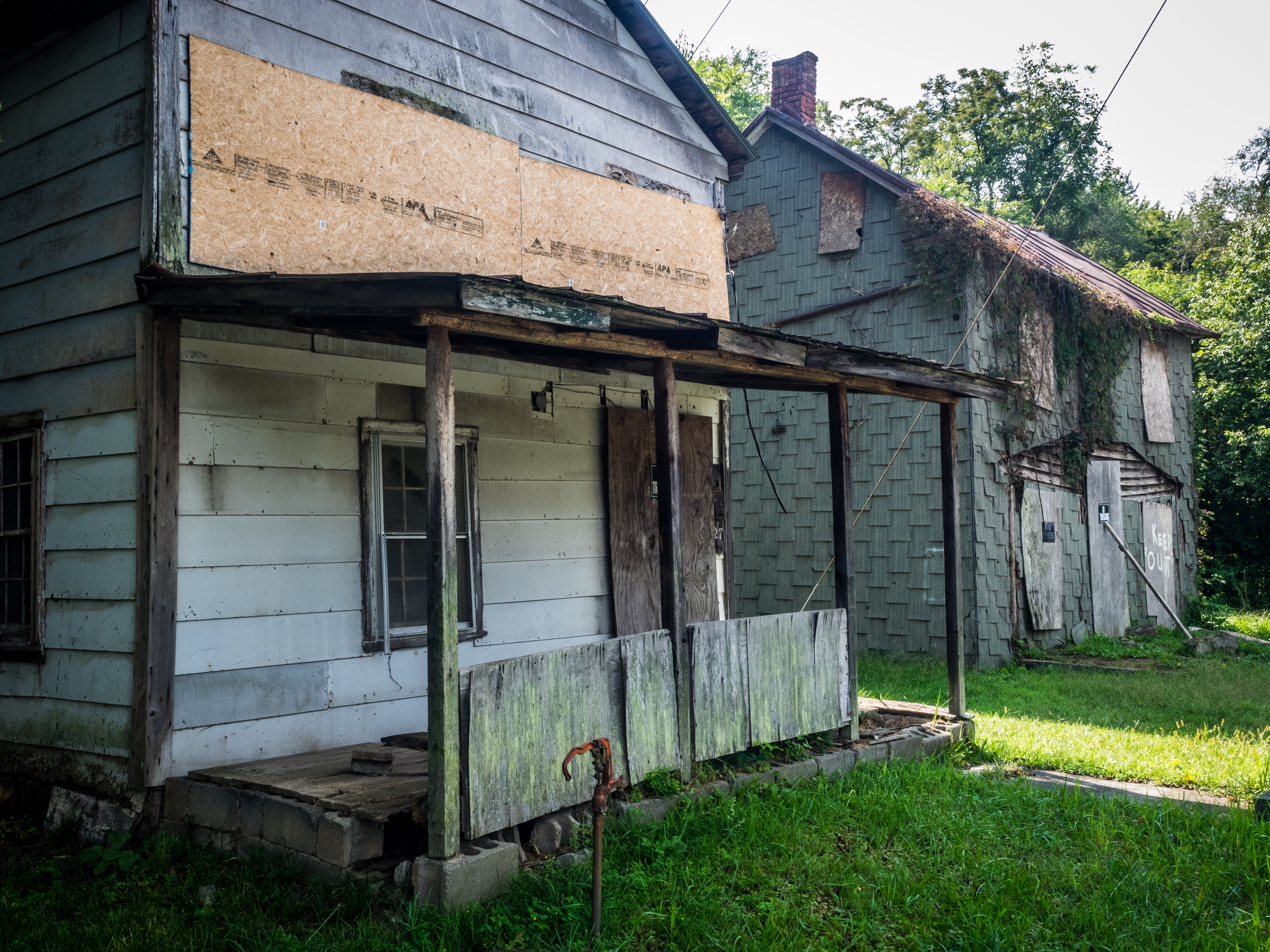
Two abandoned homes

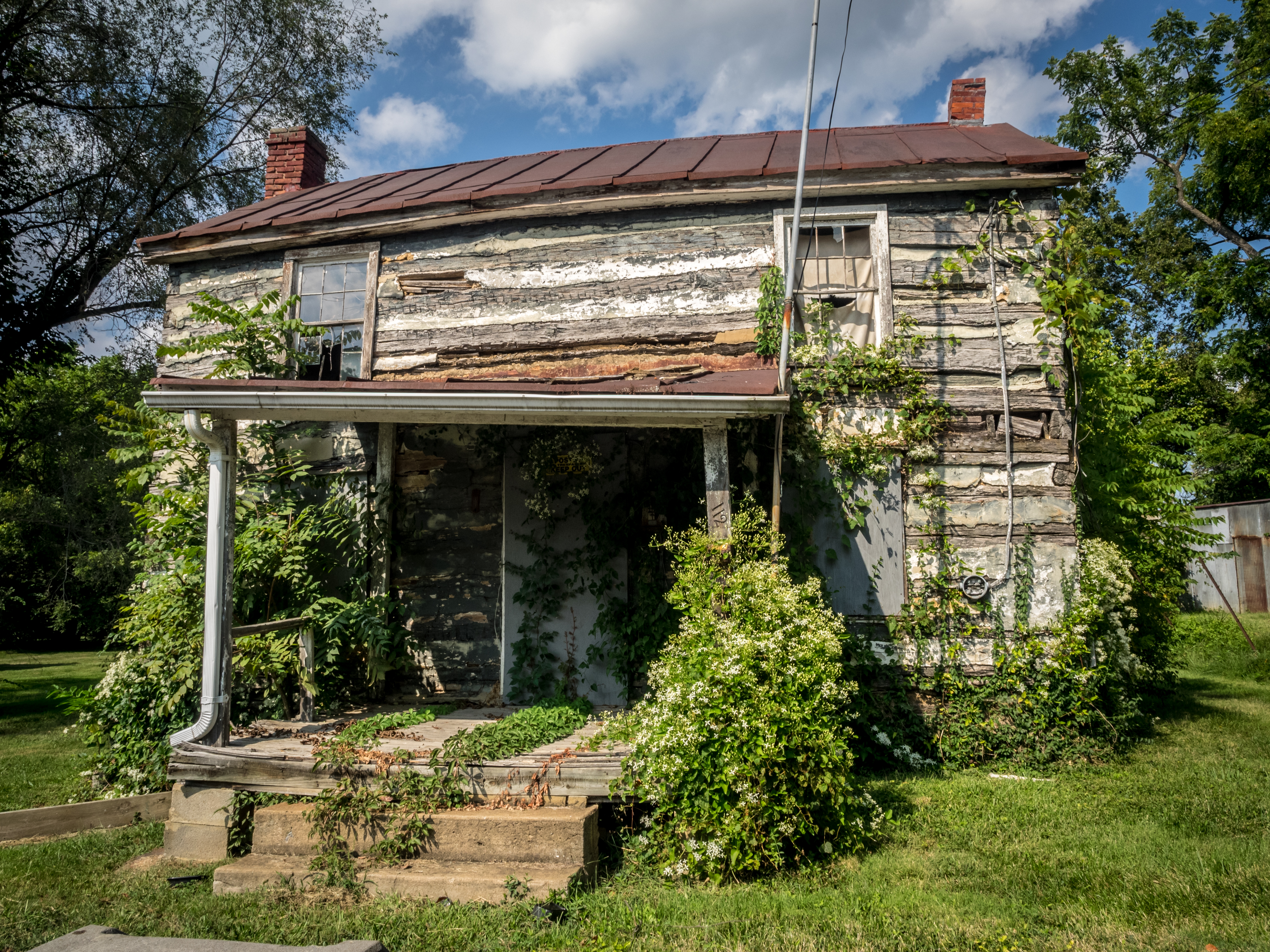
Log house

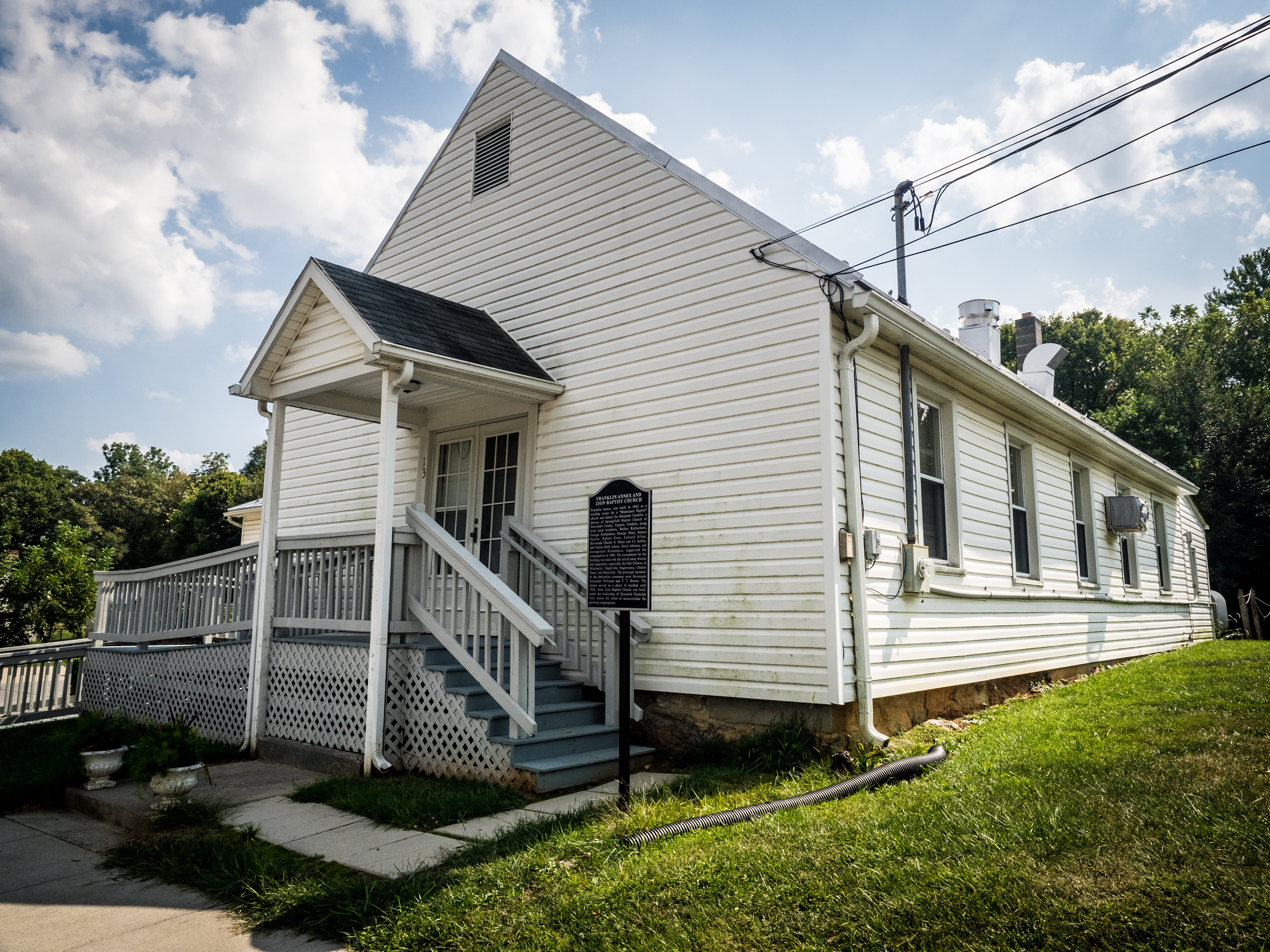
Parish Hall across from Zion Baptist Church

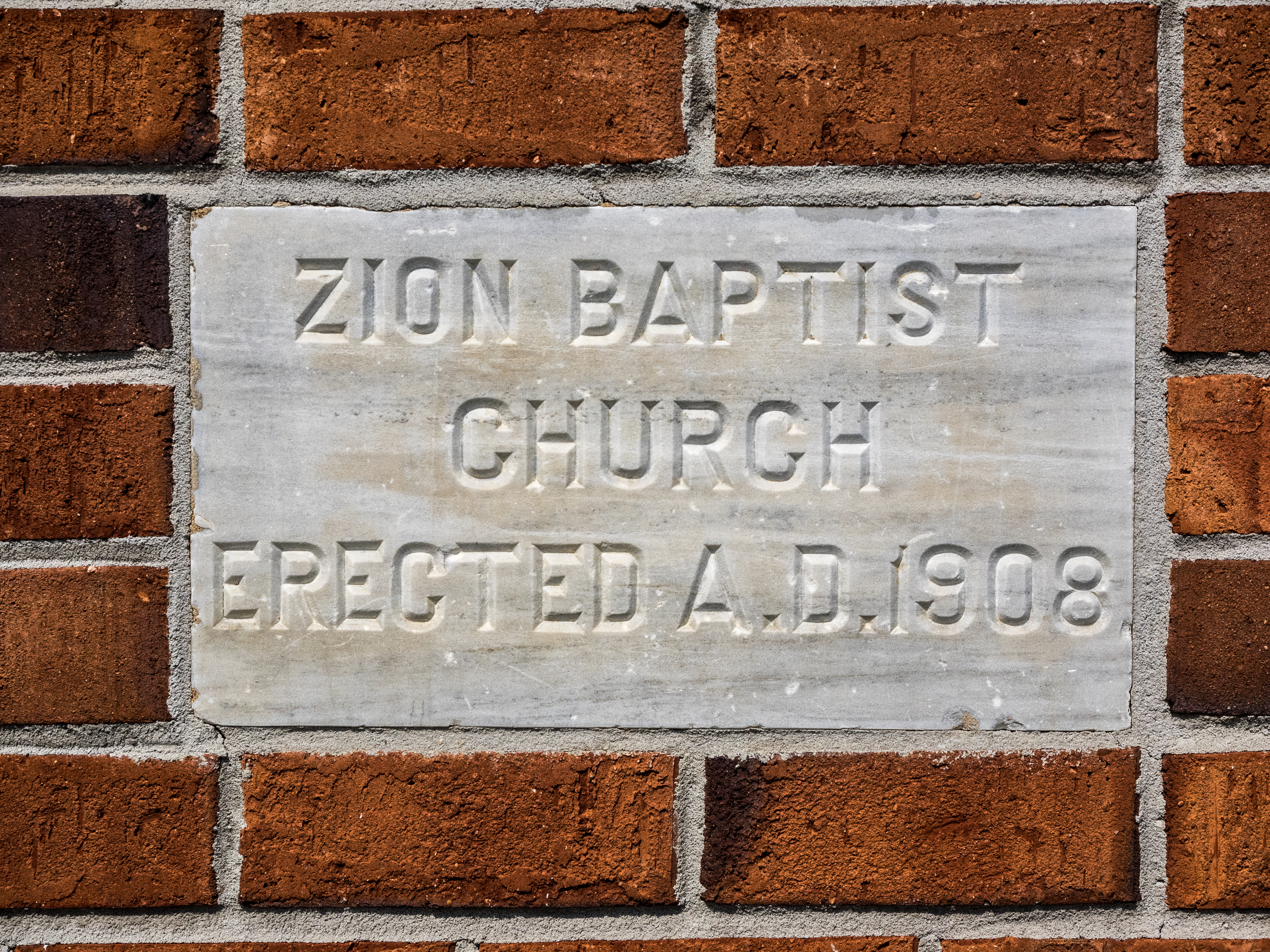
Date marker in the wall of the Zion Baptist Church

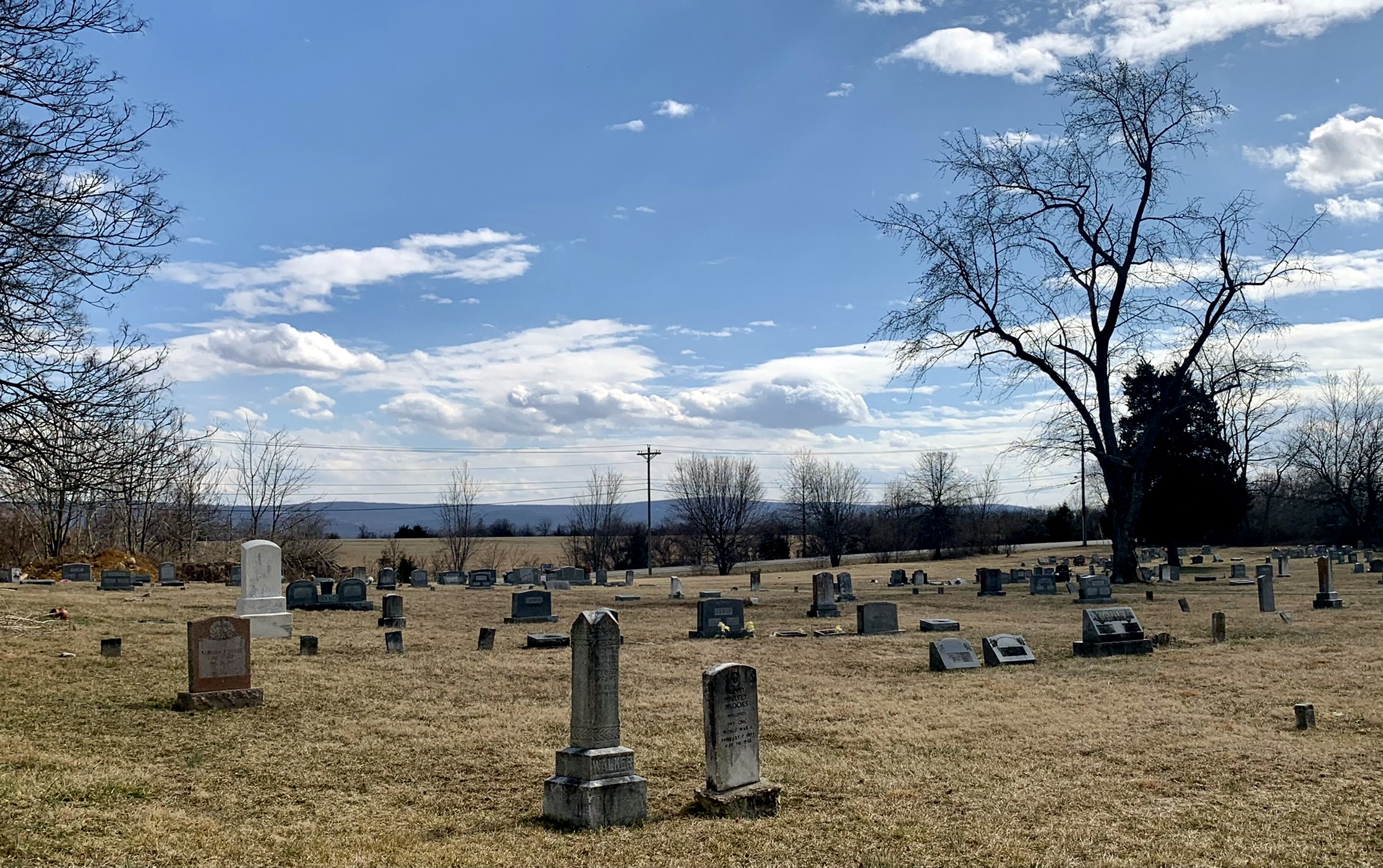
Cemetery

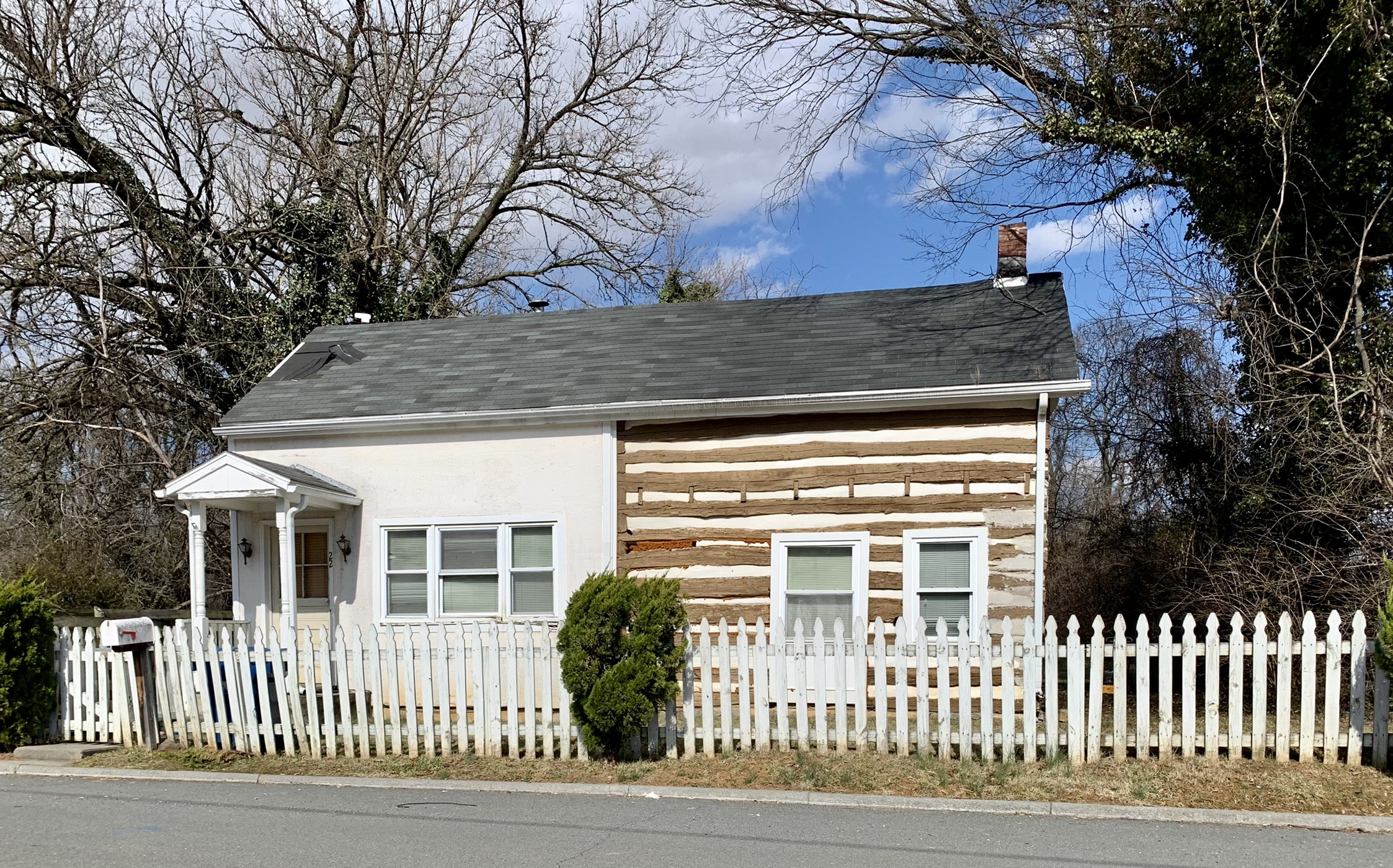
Log houses

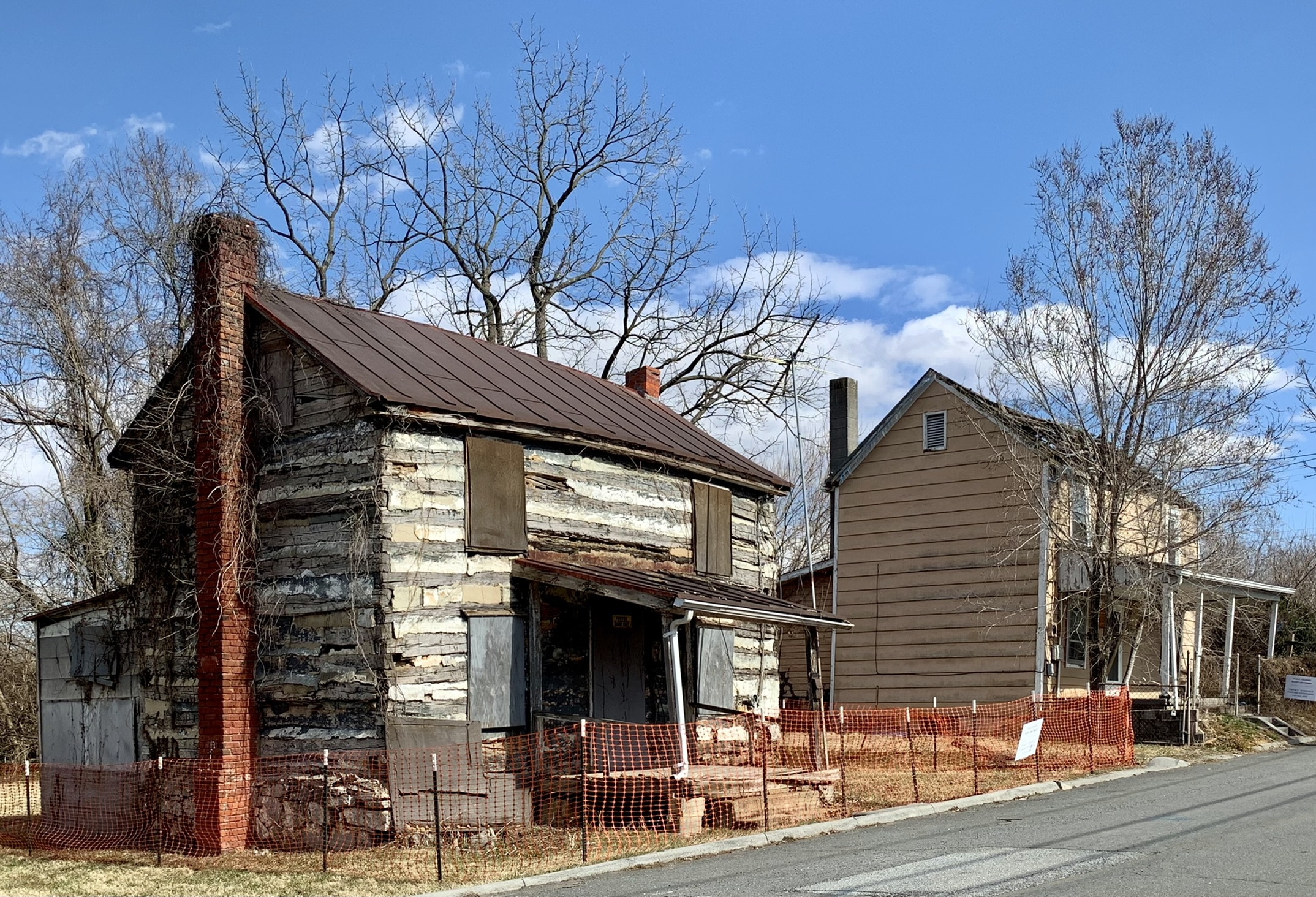
Two abandoned houses

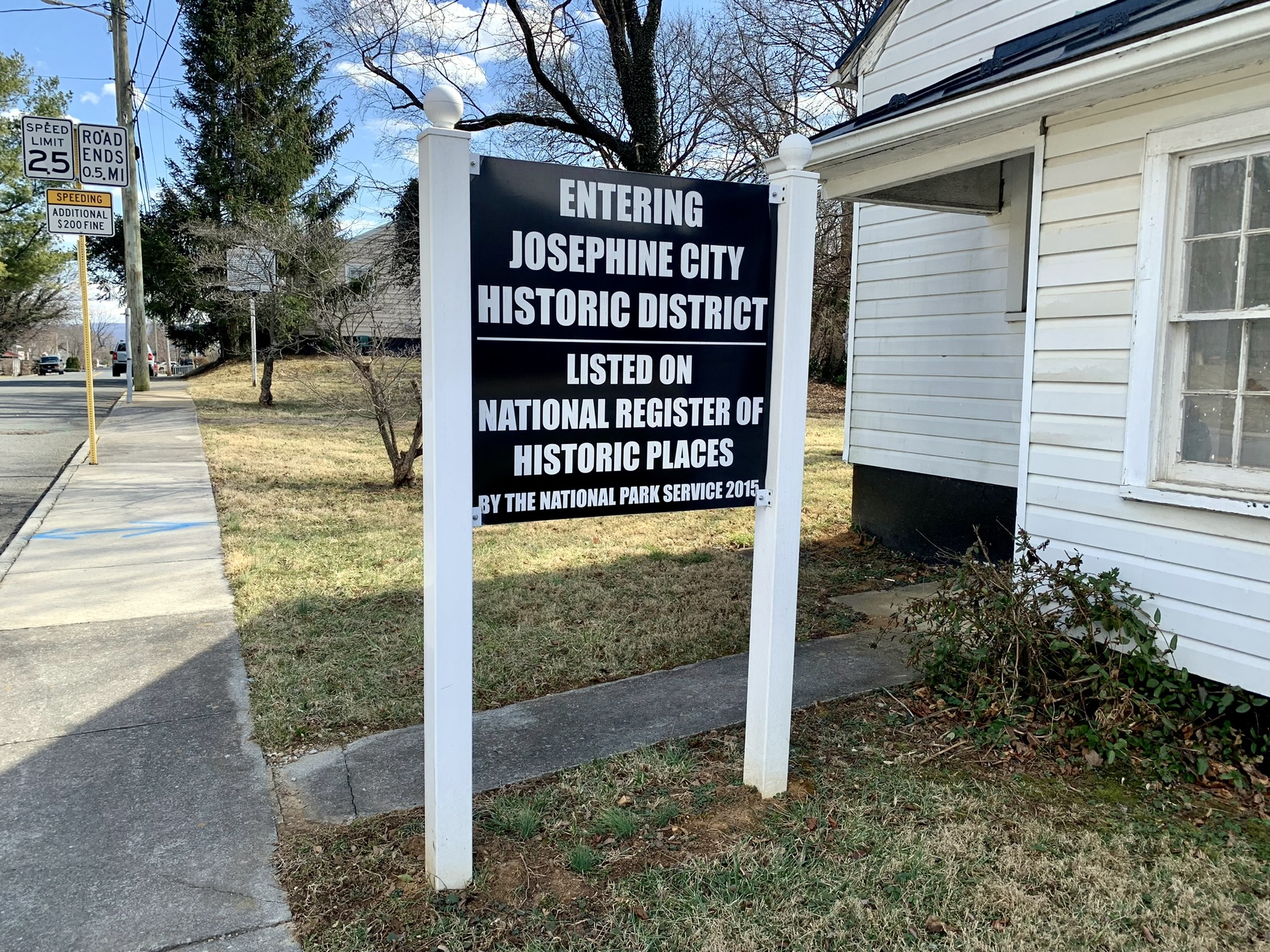
National Register of Historic Place sign
