= Berryville Historic District =

Historic district in Virginia, United States

- U.S. National Register of Historic Places
- U.S. Historic district
- Virginia Landmarks Register
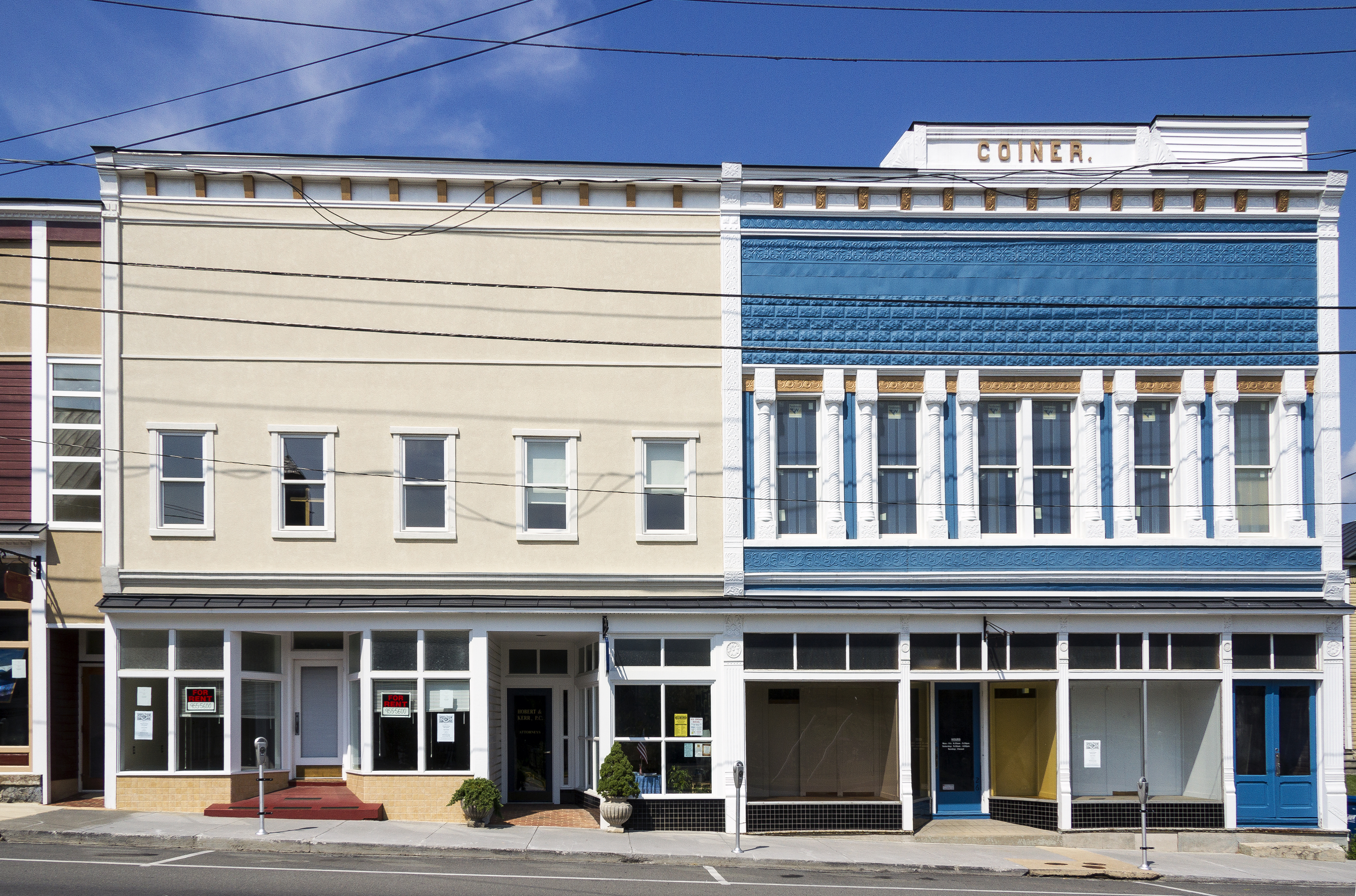
- Coiner's Department Store, August 2012

- Location within Northern Virginia Location within Virginia Location within the United States
- Location: Jct. of US 7 & 340, Main, Church, & Buckmarsh Sts., Berryville, Virginia
- Coordinates: 39.1517°N 77.9825°W
- Area: 150 acres (61 ha)
- Architect: Multiple
- Architectural style: Late 19th And 20th Century Revivals, Bungalow/craftsman, Late Victorian
- NRHP reference No.: 87001881
- VLR No.: 168-0012

Significant dates
- Added to NRHP: November 3, 1987
- Designated VLR: June 17, 1987

Berryville Historic District is a national historic district located at Berryville, Clarke County, Virginia. It encompasses 313 contributing buildings and 1 contributing object in the town of Berryville. They include a variety of residential, commercial, and industrial buildings dating from the late 18th century to the 1930s. Notable buildings include the Treadwell Smith House (Hawthorne Hall) (c. 1820), Sarah Stribling House (Battletown Inn) (c. 1810), Crow's Nest (1830s), Berryville Presbyterian Church (c. 1854), Grace Episcopal Church (1857), Coiner's Department Store (c. 1896), Clarke Milling Company (now Custom Millwork, Inc.), H. W. Baker Grain Warehouse (now Berryville Farm Supply), H. B. Whiting Brothers Warehouse, Berryville railroad depot (1910), the First National Bank (c. 1910), the Farmers and Merchants National Bank (c. 1930), and the U.S. Post Office (1938). The contributing object is the Clarke County Confederate Memorial on the grounds of the courthouse. Located in the district and separately listed is the Old Clarke County Courthouse.

It was listed on the National Register of Historic Places in 1987.

== See also ==
- Long Marsh Run Rural Historic District
