= Holy Cross Abbey, Virginia =

Trappist monastery in Berryville, Virginia

Coordinates: 39.1459°N 77.8769°W

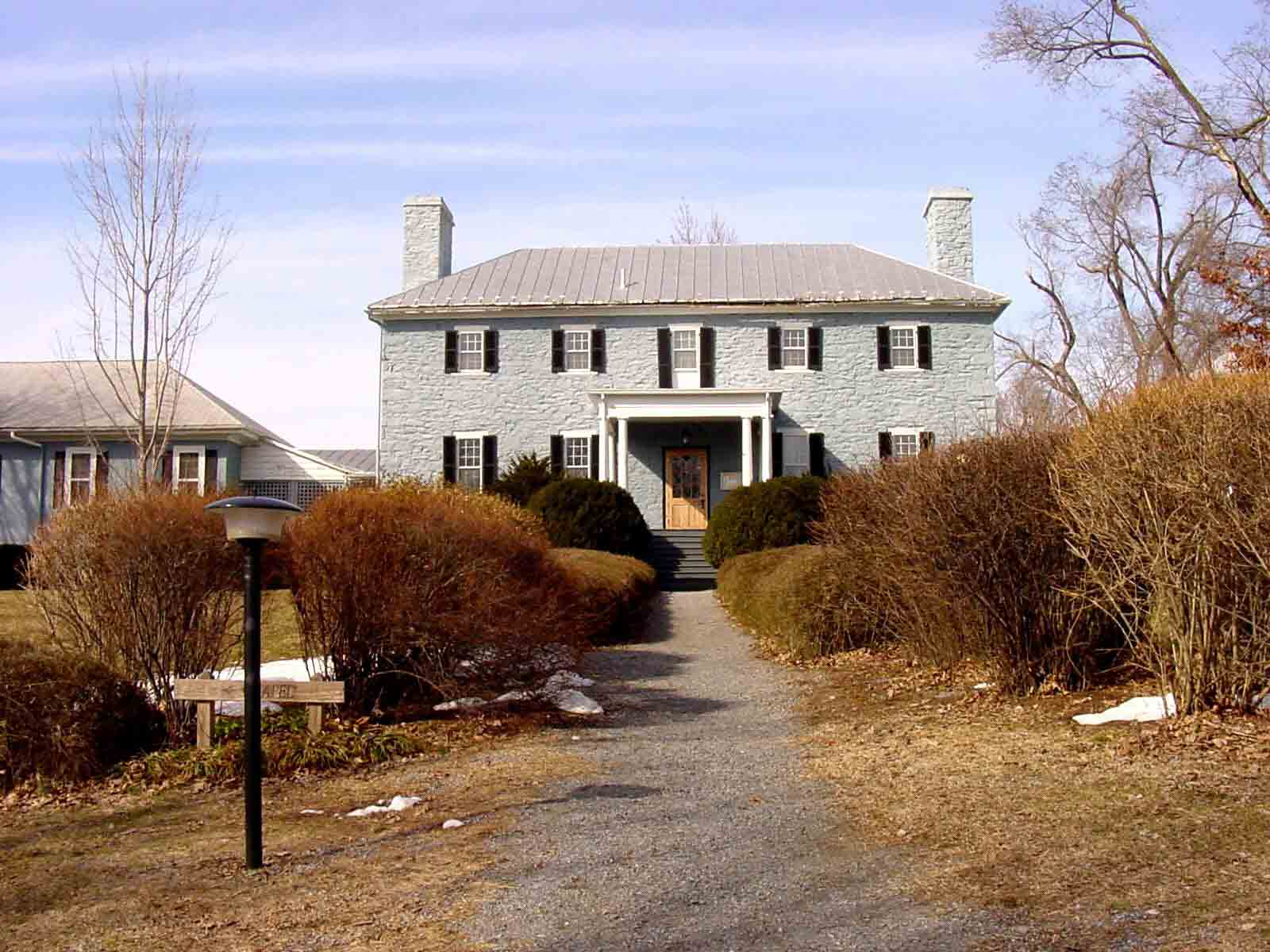
Holy Cross Abbey, Berryville, VA

Holy Cross Abbey is a monastery of the Order of Cistercians of the Strict Observance (OCSO), popularly known as the Trappists. The monastery is located near Berryville in the Shenandoah Valley of Virginia, United States.

== History ==
The order of monks that occupy the abbey originated in Valley Falls, Rhode Island. When their monastery, Our Lady of the Valley, was gutted by fire on March 21, 1950, the monks temporarily occupied an abandoned Civilian Conservation Corps camp, and moved into the new Virginia location on November 18, 1950. In 1958 the foundation was granted status as an independent abbey, electing Hugh McKiernan as its first abbot. He resigned in 1964. From 1964 to 1966, the abbey was led by a temporary superior form Holy Trinity Abbey in Utah. The second abbot was Edward McCorkell (1966–1980). Under his administration, the abbey repaid all its debts. Since the numbers of monks were dwindling, the traditional modes of large-scale farming on 1200 acres of pasture were no longer possible; the abbey leased its farm. The third abbot was Mark Delery, who served from 1984 to 1990.

At its peak around 1965, there were 68 monks in the community. In 2016 there were eleven.

The monks make and sell fruitcakes and creamed honey and they own and operate a natural cemetery and a retreat house where guests can stay for several days at a time. In 2007, the community decided to make a major transition to sustainable, eco-friendly methods of production. The effort was deemed a success and became the topic of a 400-page research report submitted to the University of Michigan. The magazine National Geographic praised their efforts at sustainability in a 2017 feature article.

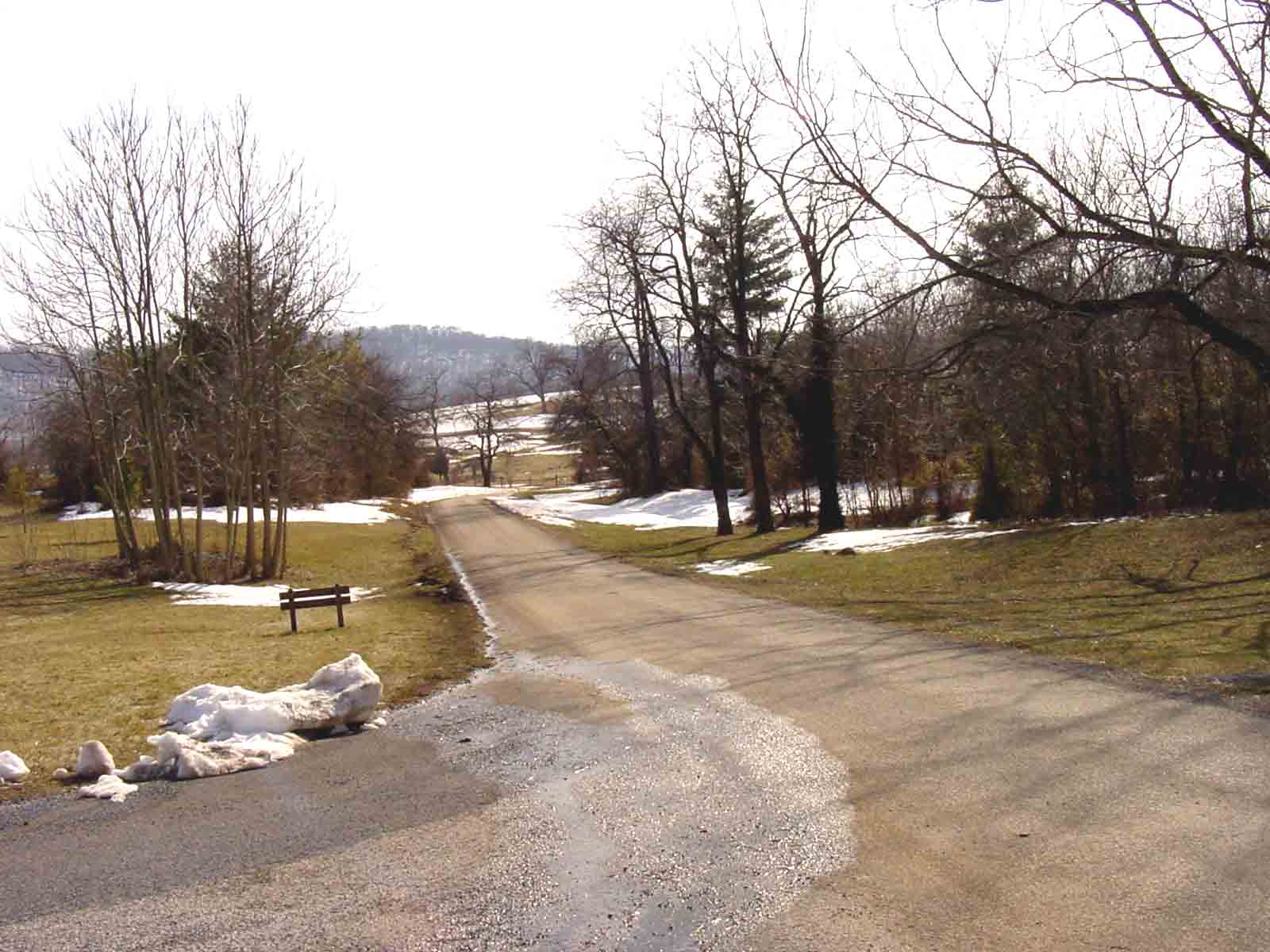
View from Holy Cross Abbey
