= Long Marsh Run Rural Historic District =

Historic district in Virginia, United States

- U.S. National Register of Historic Places
- U.S. Historic district
- Virginia Landmarks Register
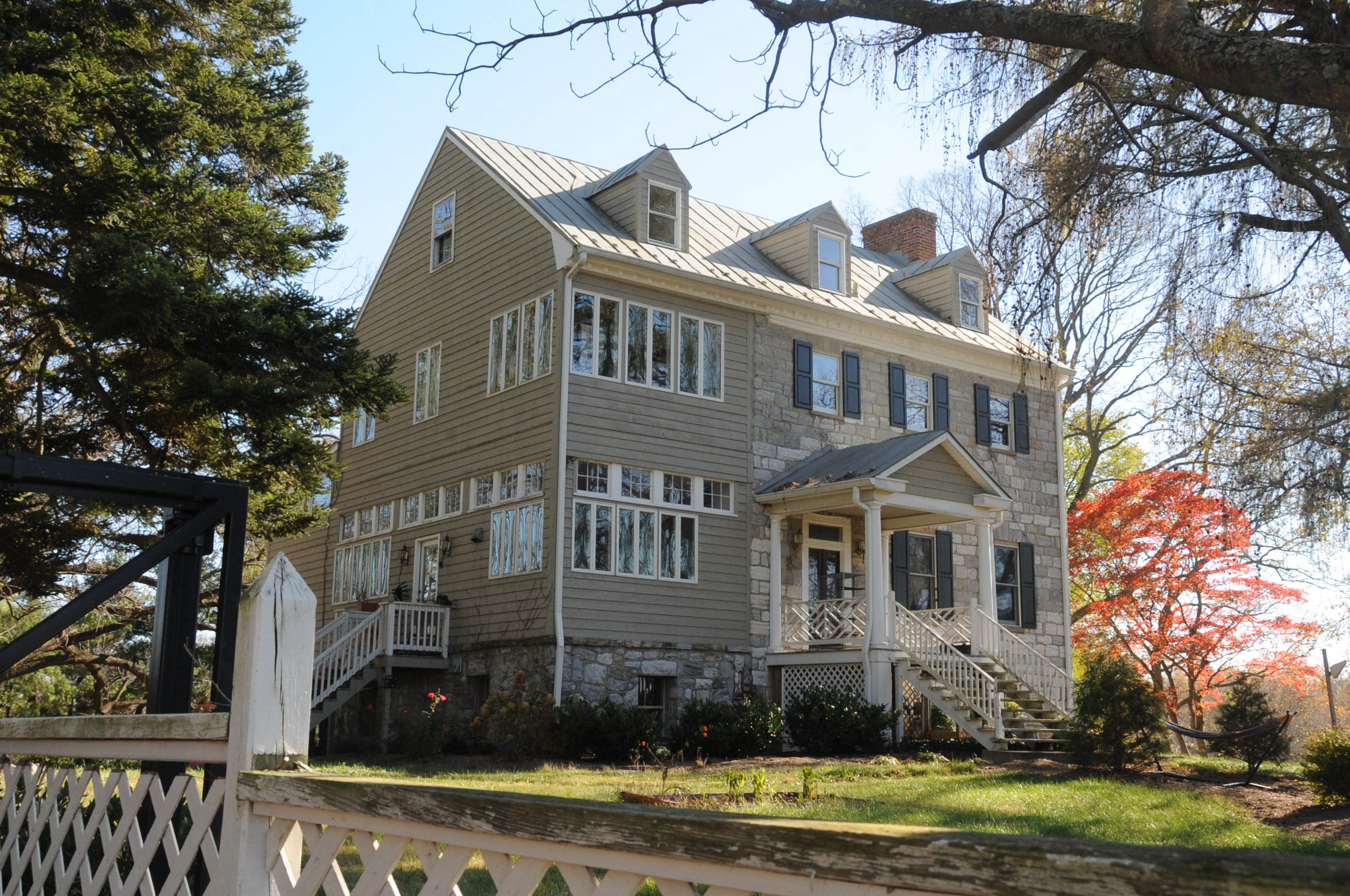
- Villa LaRue

- Location within Northern Virginia Location within Virginia Location within the United States
- Location: Roughly bounded by WV state line, Virginia 608, Virginia 612, Virginia 7, and VA 653, Berryville, Virginia
- Coordinates: 39°8′55″N 77°54′38″W
- Area: 10,293 acres (4,165 ha)
- Architect: Kimmell, A.J.; Light, Harry P., et al.
- Architectural style: Georgian, Federal, Greek Revival
- NRHP reference No.: 96001173
- VLR No.: 021-0967

Significant dates
- Added to NRHP: November 4, 1996
- Designated VLR: June 19, 1996

Long Marsh Run Rural Historic District is a national historic district located just outside Berryville, in Clarke County, Virginia. It encompasses 315 contributing buildings, 16 contributing sites, and 35 contributing structures. The district includes the agricultural landscape and architectural resources of an area distinctively rural that contains numerous large antebellum and postbellum estates, and several smaller 19th-century farms, churches, schools and African-American communities.

Long Marsh Run Rural Historic District was listed on the National Register of Historic Places in 1996.

== The district ==
The contributing buildings are primarily farm and estate residences and their associated outbuildings. There are approximately 60 such contributing complexes in the district. Other contributing buildings include four schools, four churches, two mills, two mill sites, and a post office. Three small African-American communities are also included, some with their original school and church. The 35 contributing structures are mostly corncribs (and 6 metal windmills), and the 16 contributing sites are mainly cemeteries and ruins of historic buildings.

Fairfield is a Georgian-style plantation house built of native limestone around 1770 at the center of a 1,600-acre landholding. In addition to being the oldest building in the district, Fairfield was the home of Warner Washington (1715-1791), a first-cousin of George Washington, and is considered to be the best example in the district of the importation of a Tidewater plantation to the Shenandoah Valley.

The LaRue Estates

Long Marsh Run, the creek for which the district was named, was first settled by the LaRue family in the 1740s. Today, four homes associated with the LaRue family survive. The first is Bloomfield, which was built by Jacob LaRue in 1775. A two-story, double-pile, coursed limestone structure, Bloomfield is the oldest Larue home still standing. Jacob's father, Isaac, built his home, Claremont, a short distance away in 1778. Claremont is a two-story, three-bay, coursed limestone, vernacular building very similar in form to Bloomfield. It may have replaced Isaac's original log cabin from the 1740s.

Jabez LaRue built his home, Villa LaRue, a few miles to the east of Bloomfield and Claremont in the 1790s. As a side-passage-plan dwelling, it is unique for its use of coursed limestone in the front and random rubble on the sides and back. Just to the south of Villa LaRue is Longmarsh, which was also built of stone around the same time as the others. The original two-story, two-bay section of this house is small and was supposedly an overseer's house for Villa LaRue.

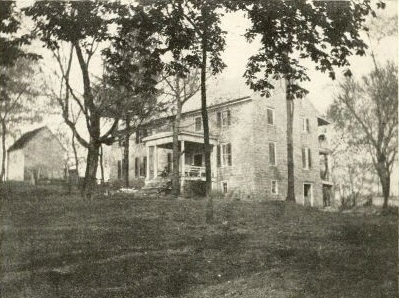
Bloomfield, built in 1775 by Jacob LaRue.

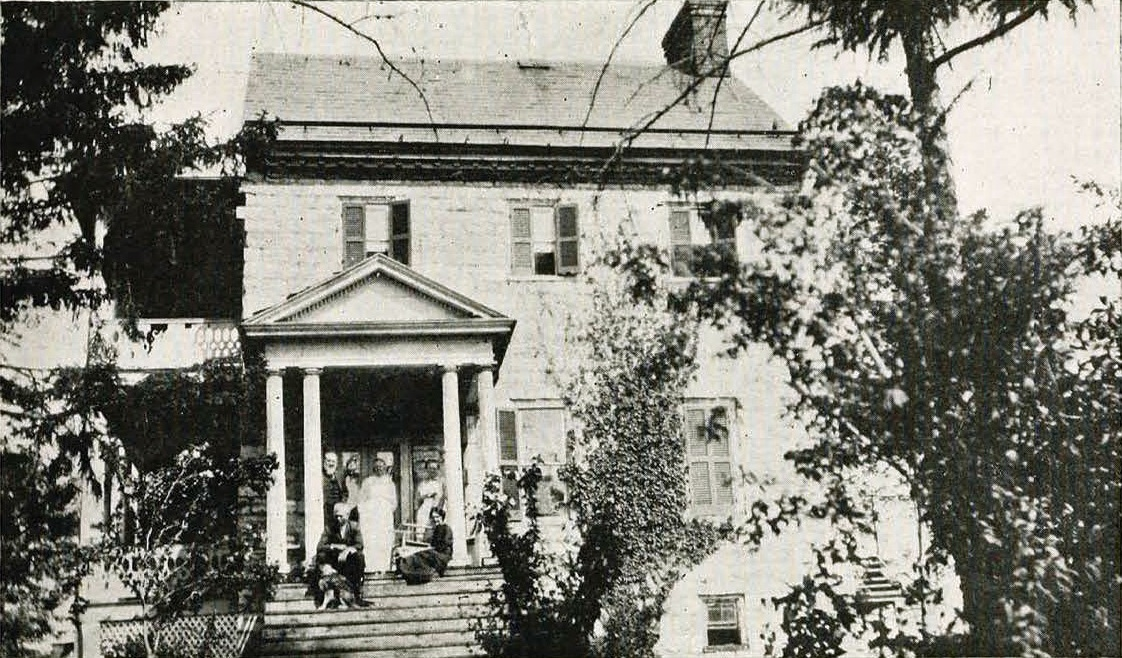
Villa LaRue, built by Jabez LaRue in the 1790s.

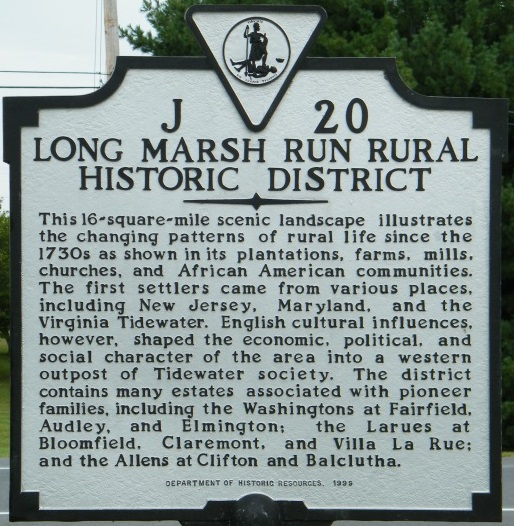
Historical marker

== See also ==
- Berryville Historic District
- National Register of Historic Places listings in Clarke County, Virginia
- Helm Place (Elizabethtown, Kentucky)
