= Clarke County High School (Berryville, Virginia) =

Coordinates: 39°9′31.6″N 78°0′5.5″W

Location
- 627 Mosby Boulevard; Berryville, Virginia 22611; United States

Information
- Type: Public
- Established: 1920
- School district: Clarke County Public Schools
- Principal: Dana Waring
- Grades: 9-12
- Enrollment: 680 (2022-23)
- Campus: urban
- Colors: Navy, Orange and White
- Athletics conference: Virginia High School League; A Region B A Bull Run District
- Mascot: Eagle
- Yearbook: The Talon
- Website: cchs.clarke.k12.va.us

Clarke County High School is a public high school in Berryville, Virginia, United States. It is part of the Clarke County Public Schools in Clarke County, Virginia.

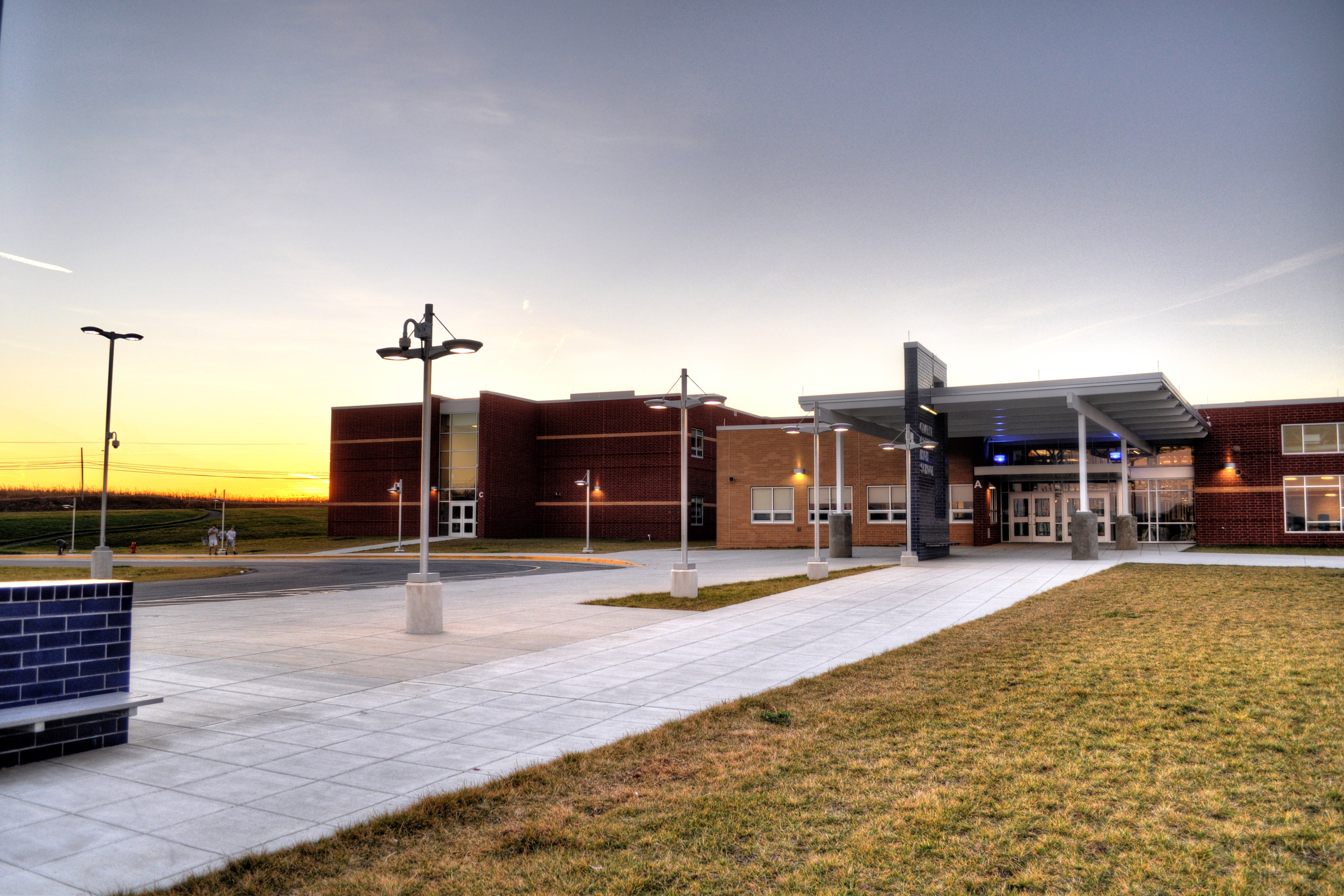
The current CCHS building in 2012.
