= Chapel Hill (Berryville, Virginia) =

Historic house in Virginia, United States

- U.S. National Register of Historic Places
- Virginia Landmarks Register
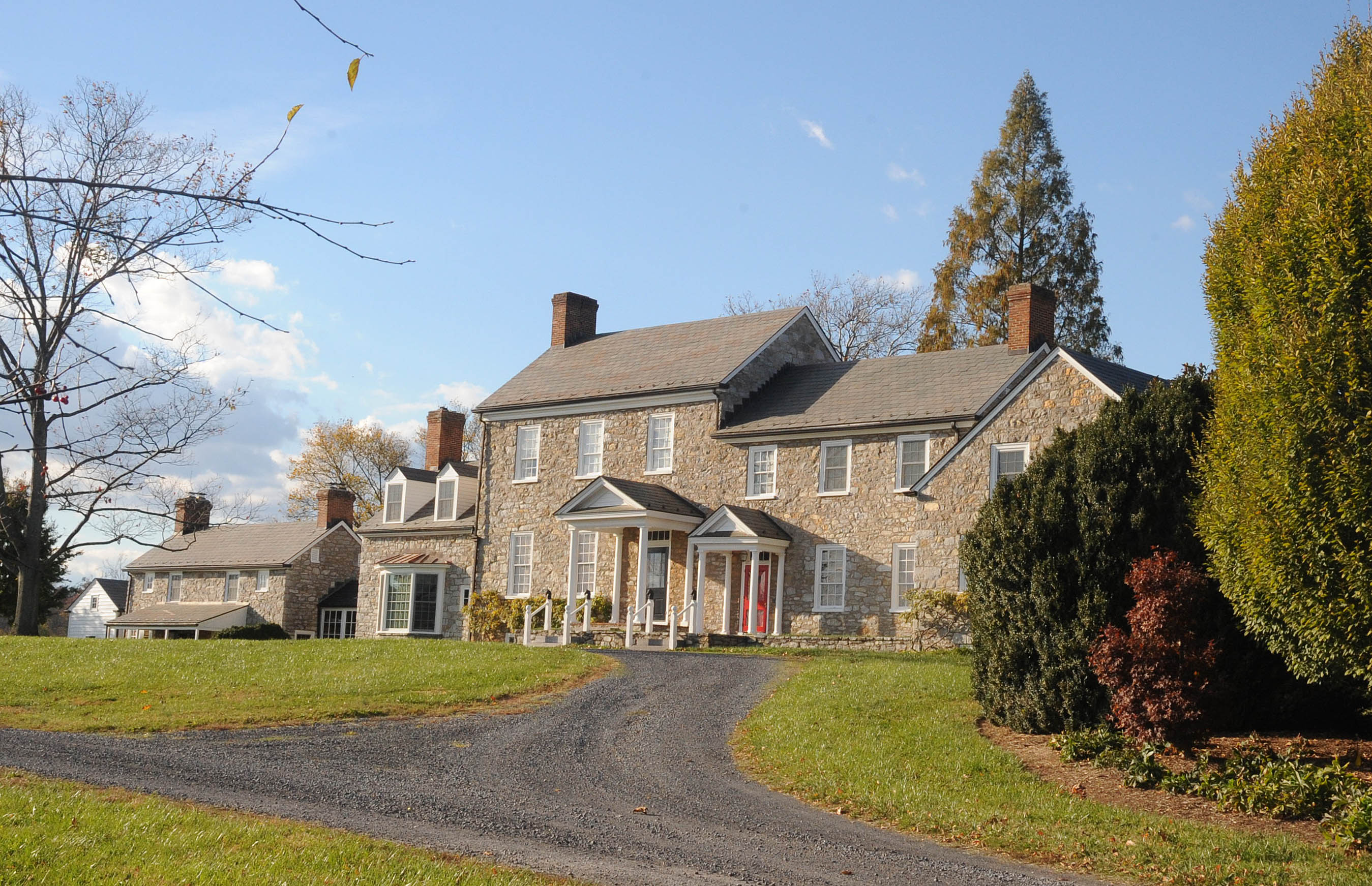

- Location within Northern Virginia Location within Virginia Location within the United States
- Location: 300 Chapel Hill Ln., near Berryville, Virginia
- Coordinates: 39°6′49″N 78°1′14″W
- Area: 477 acres (193 ha)
- Built: c. 1825, 1938
- Architect: George L. Howe
- Architectural style: Federal, Colonial Revival
- NRHP reference No.: 04000846
- VLR No.: 021-0014

Significant dates
- Added to NRHP: December 30, 2004
- Designated VLR: June 16, 2004

Chapel Hill is a historic plantation house located near Berryville, Clarke County, Virginia. The oldest sections of the main house dates to the mid-1820s and is in the Federal style. They are the central two-story, six-bay section, which consists of two distinct gable-roofed blocks; and the two-story, three-bay section now at the southernmost end of the house. The house was remodeled and enlarged in 1941 in the Colonial Revival style, after plans drawn up by George L. Howe, a Washington, DC architect. Also on the property are the contributing stable, groom's house, frame bank barn, machine shed, corncrib, barn, chicken coop, and three small sheds. The property was purchased by William J. Donovan (1883-1959) in 1938, who subsequently undertook the renovation and expansion of the main house. Architect George L. Howe designed alterations and additions during 1938–1941.

It was listed on the National Register of Historic Places in 2004.
