= Cool Spring Battlefield =

- U.S. National Register of Historic Places
- U.S. Historic district
- Virginia Landmarks Register
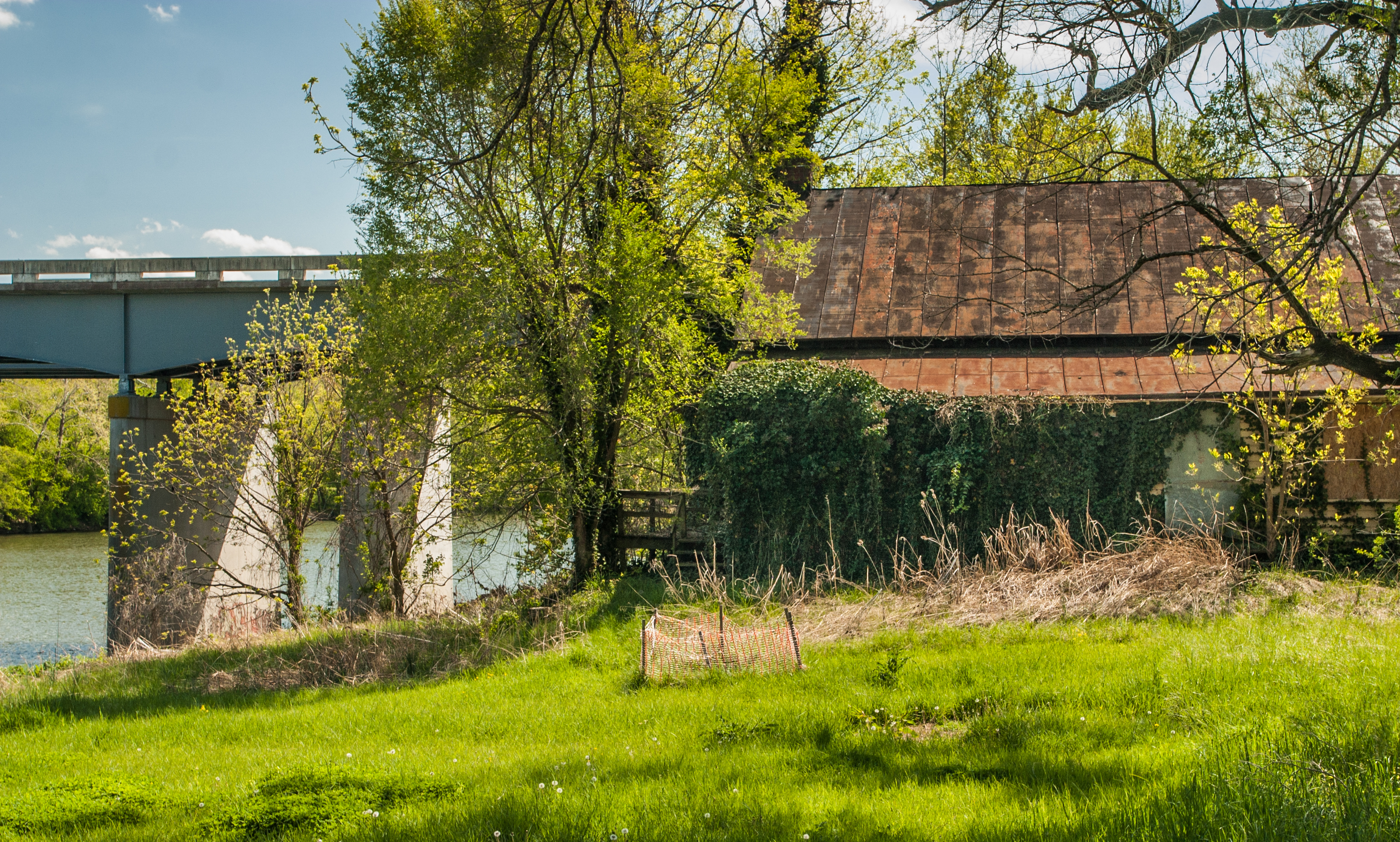
- Ferry House at Shenandoah River, April 2013

- Location within Northern Virginia Location within Virginia Location within the United States
- Location: Jct of Shenandoah R. and VA 643, near Berryville, Virginia
- Coordinates: 39°8′1″N 77°51′59″W
- Area: 4,064 acres (1,645 ha)
- Built: 1864
- Architectural style: Greek Revival, Federal, Georgian
- NRHP reference No.: 97000492
- VLR No.: 021-0976

Significant dates
- Added to NRHP: June 6, 1997
- Designated VLR: December 6, 1995

Cool Spring Battlefield is a historic American Civil War battlefield and national historic district located near Berryville, Clarke County, Virginia. It encompasses 17 contributing buildings, 26 contributing sites, and 11 contributing structures. The district includes the terrain and hydrography over which the Battle of Cool Spring, July 16–20, 1864, was fought and which served to shape the tactical progress of the engagement in time and space. The district also includes the archaeological and architectural remnants of plantations, farmsteads, transportation, mining, and industrial centers that were a part of the economically prosperous community over which the conflict was fought. Located in the district is the separately listed Wickliffe Church.

It was listed on the National Register of Historic Places in 1997. In 2014, a revision eliminated a building constructed circa 1880 and an archeological site that had been disturbed and did not relate to the Civil War period.

The Civil War Trust (a division of the American Battlefield Trust) and its partners have acquired and preserved 1,226 acres (4.96 km^{2}) of the battlefield. Since 2013, Shenandoah University has helped protect the preserved land. One hundred ninety-five acres of the battlefield are known as the Shenandoah River Campus at Cool Spring Battlefield - an outdoor classroom for the university and the general public.
