= Soldier's Rest =

Historic house in Virginia, United States

- U.S. National Register of Historic Places
- Virginia Landmarks Register
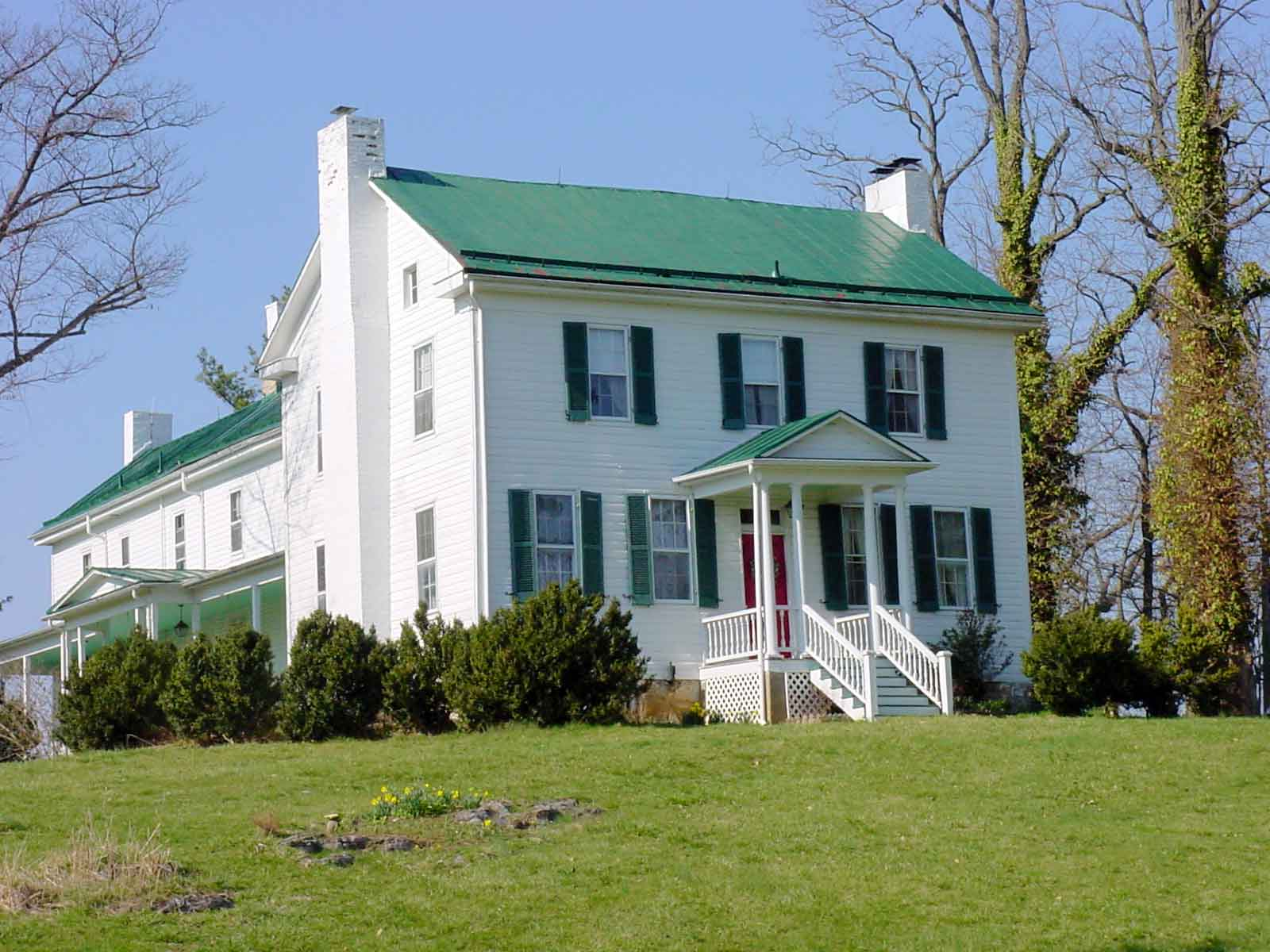
- Soldier's Rest

- Location within Northern Virginia Location within Virginia Location within the United States
- Interactive map showing the location of Soldier’s Rest
- Location: .3 mi N of Fairfax Ave., approximately .5 mi. E of jct. of US 340 and VA 7, near Berryville, Virginia
- Coordinates: 39°09′24″N 77°58′12″W
- Area: 22 acres (8.9 ha)
- Built: 1780
- Architectural style: Federal
- NRHP reference No.: 96000579
- VLR No.: 021-0073

Significant dates
- Added to NRHP: May 23, 1996
- Designated VLR: March 20, 1996

Soldier's Rest is a historic farmhouse located in Berryville, Clarke County, Virginia. It was constructed about 1780 for the family of William Morton. The property was later owned, and expanded upon, by Daniel Morgan, a general in the American Revolution. The property was also owned by Col Griffin Taylor, a veteran of the War of 1812. The fact that it was owned by two soldiers gave the home the "Soldier's Rest" moniker.

Prior to the current house being built, a smaller one stood some 200 yards away, and said to be the place where George Washington stayed when he was surveying the land here for Lord Fairfax in 1748.

The property was acquired by Charles Paxton-Paret, a direct descendant of Capt. Daniel Johannes Goos and Capt. George Lock of Lake Charles, LA, and long time historic preservationist.

It was listed on the National Register of Historic Places in 1996.
