= Glendale Farm =

Historic house in Virginia, United States

- U.S. National Register of Historic Places
- Virginia Landmarks Register
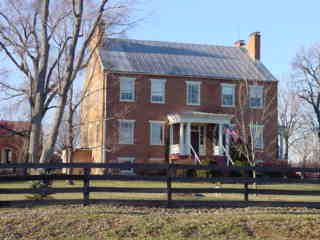
- Glendale farmhouse, January 2003

- Location within Northern Virginia Location within Virginia Location within the United States
- Location: Jct. of VA 761 and VA 632, N side, near Berryville, Virginia
- Coordinates: 39°13′49″N 78°00′44″W
- Area: 53.3 acres (21.6 ha)
- Built: 1847
- Architectural style: Greek Revival
- NRHP reference No.: 95000244
- VLR No.: 021-0034

Significant dates
- Added to NRHP: March 17, 1995
- Designated VLR: January 15, 1995

Glendale Farm is a historic home and farm located near Berryville, Clarke County, Virginia. The main house was built about 1847, and is a two-story, five-bay, double-pile, brick dwelling. The interior features most of its original provincial Greek Revival woodwork. Also on the property are the contributing one-story, two-unit kitchen/laundry/slave quarters outbuilding; Appalachian double-crib log barn; corn crib, granary, and hog shed.

It was listed on the National Register of Historic Places in 1990.
