= Norwood (Berryville, Virginia) =

Historic house in Virginia, United States

- U.S. National Register of Historic Places
- Virginia Landmarks Register
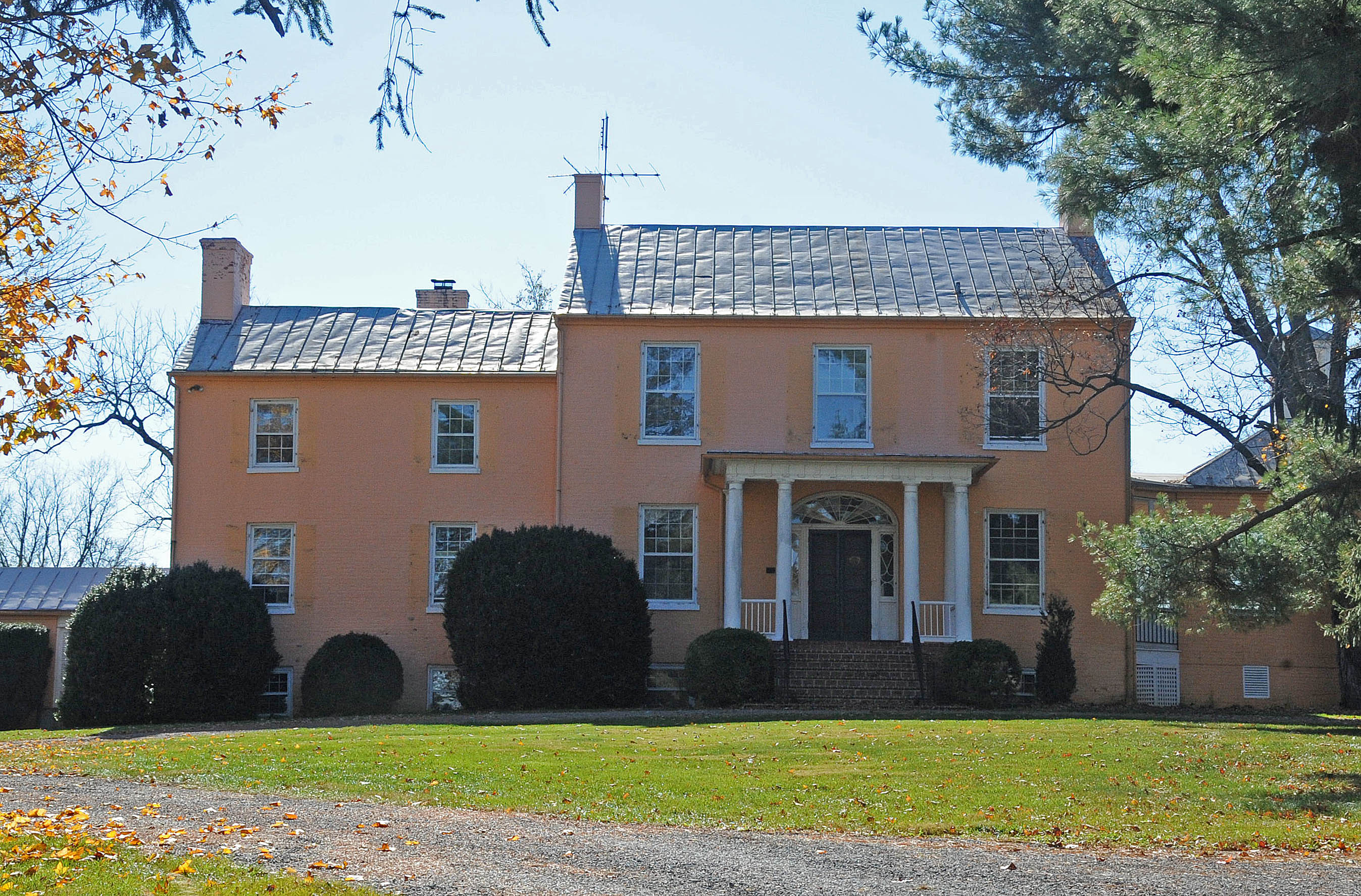

- Location within Northern Virginia Location within Virginia Location within the United States
- Location: VA 7, S side, 7/8 mi. E of jct. with VA BR 7, near Berryville, Virginia
- Coordinates: 39°08′26″N 77°57′01″W
- Area: 65 acres (26 ha)
- Built: c. 1819
- Architectural style: Federal
- NRHP reference No.: 94001180
- VLR No.: 021-0057

Significant dates
- Added to NRHP: September 30, 1994
- Designated VLR: August 17, 1994

Norwood is a historic plantation house and farm located near Berryville, Clarke County, Virginia. The main house was built about 1819, and consists of a two-story, three-bay, brick main block with two-story, brick side wing in the Federal-style. The front facade features a classical one-story, one-bay portico with Doric order columns. Also on the property are the contributing brick meathouse, which dates to the same period as the main house; a late 19th-century frame tenant house; and several late 19th-century agricultural buildings.

It was listed on the National Register of Historic Places in 1994.
