= Clermont (Berryville, Virginia) =

Historic house in Virginia, United States

- U.S. National Register of Historic Places
- U.S. Historic district
- Virginia Landmarks Register
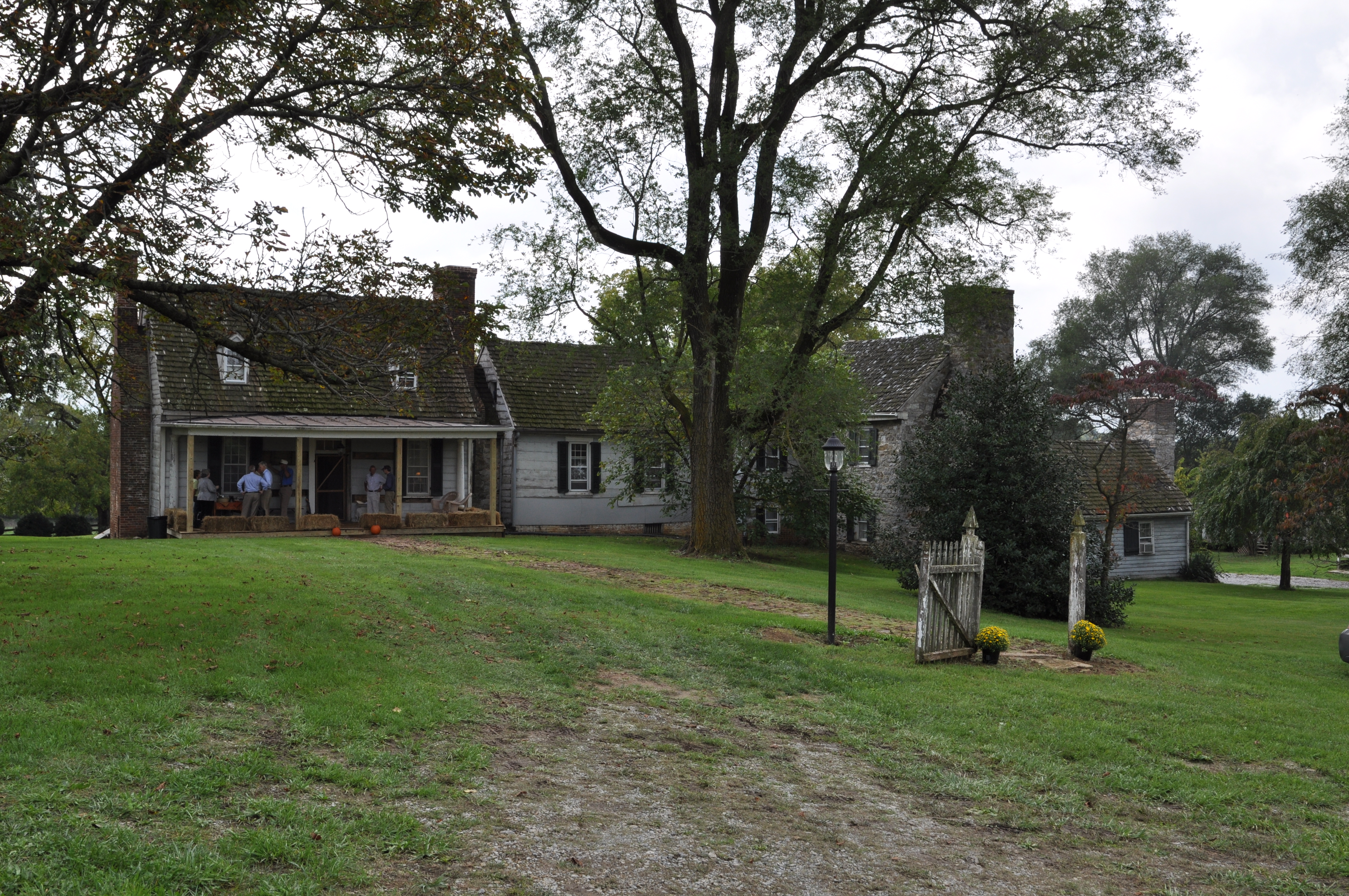

- Location within Northern Virginia Location within Virginia Location within the United States
- Location: 801 E. Main St., Berryville, Virginia
- Coordinates: 39°8′24″N 77°57′48″W
- Area: 355 acres (144 ha)
- Built: 1756
- Architectural style: Colonial, Federal
- NRHP reference No.: 05000767
- VLR No.: 021-0019

Significant dates
- Added to NRHP: July 27, 2005
- Designated VLR: June 1, 2005

Clermont is a 355-acre (1.44 km^{2}) farm and national historic district located near Berryville, Clarke County, Virginia. The main house was created by Edward Snickers in five parts, beginning in 1756, with additions circa 1770, 1810 and 1840, with a final addition in 1970. The house has an unusual plan with a stair perpendicular to the central hall.

The original land grant was made from Thomas Fairfax, 6th Lord Fairfax of Cameron to John Vance in 1751. Vance, born in 1699, was from County Tyrone in Ireland, sailing to America in 1731. In 1753 he sold the property to Thomas Wadlington, who in turn sold to Edward Snickers, who ran a tavern and a ferry on the Shenandoah River near Williams Gap, later called Snickers Gap. His son William inherited the property in 1791. In 1819 William Snickers sold Clermont to Dawson McCormick, whose son Edward inherited the property in 1834. After Edward's death in 1871, his wife Emma sold a 321 acres (1.30 km^{2}) of the property to former slaves and other African-Americans in the area, creating the community of Josephine City, now Josephine Street in Berryville.
