= Cleridge =

- U.S. National Register of Historic Places
- Virginia Landmarks Register
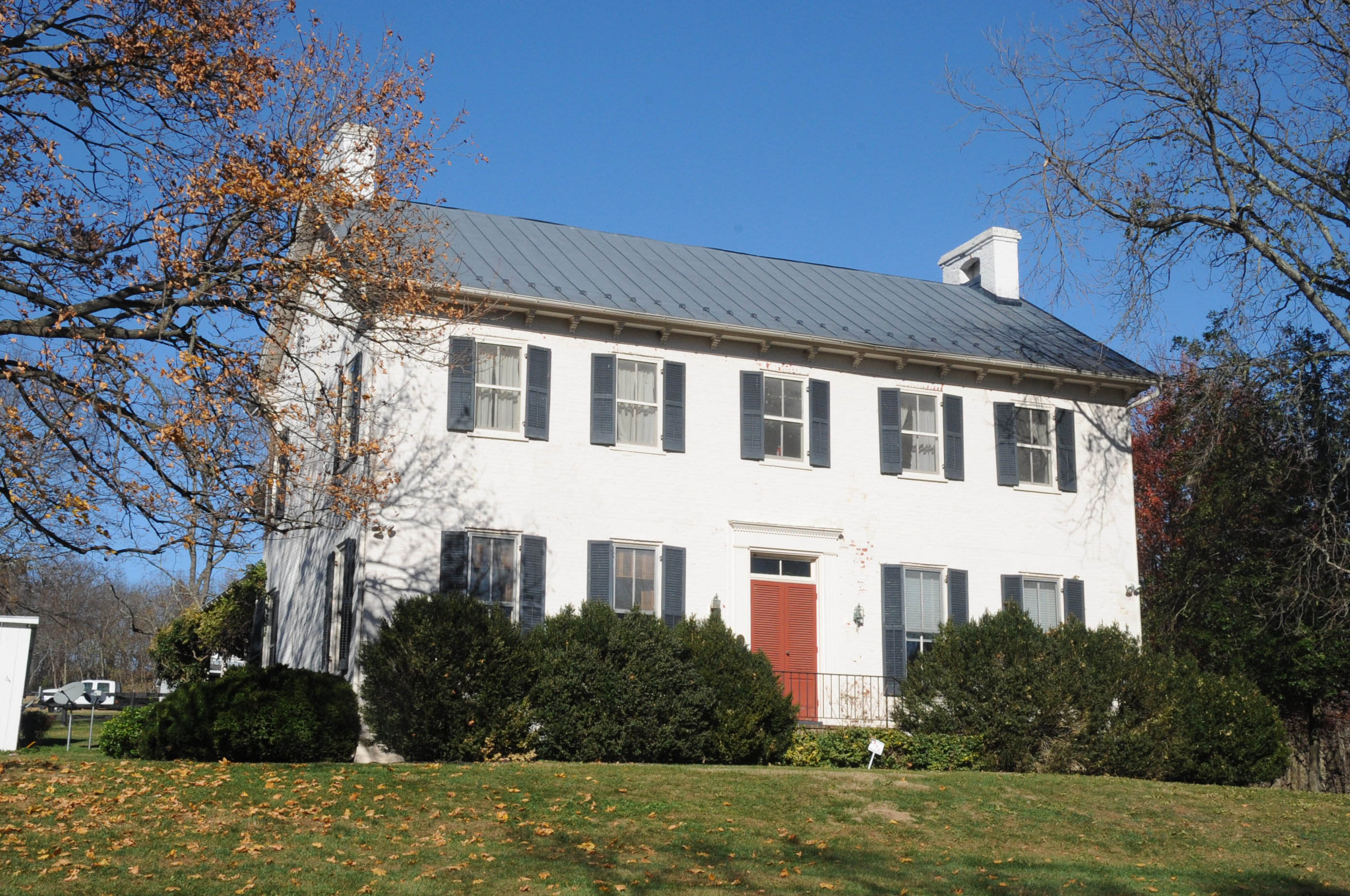
- Cleridge in 2016

- Location within Northern Virginia Location within Virginia Location within the United States
- Location: 1649 Old Charles Town Rd., near Stephenson, Virginia
- Coordinates: 39.2247°N 78.06102°W
- Area: 591 acres (239 ha)
- Built: c. 1790, c. 1815, 1882-1883
- Built by: Lemley, Jacob H., & sons Charlie & William
- Architectural style: Federal
- NRHP reference No.: 11000653
- VLR No.: 034-0111

Significant dates
- Added to NRHP: September 8, 2011
- Designated VLR: December 13, 2012

Cleridge, also known as Sunnyside Farm, is a historic home and farm complex located near Stephenson, in Frederick County, Virginia. The main house was built about 1790, and is a 2 1/2-story, five-bay, Federal style brick dwelling. It has a 2 1/2-story, four-bay, brick addition added in 1882–1883. Also on the property are the contributing brick well structure, the frame icehouse/blacksmith shop, a frame carriage house, the brick-entry, a frame poultry house, and a farm manager's house (c. 1815). The cultivated and forested land is considered a contributing agricultural site.

It was listed on the National Register of Historic Places in 2011.
