= Berryville, Virginia =

- Town
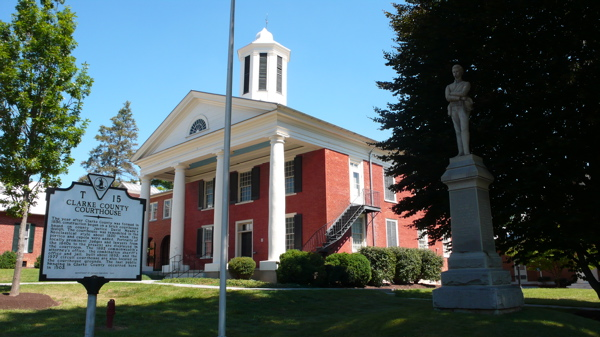
- The Old Clarke County Courthouse in Berryville

- Flag Seal Logo

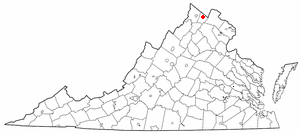
- Location of Berryville in Virginia
- Coordinates: 39°9′4″N 77°58′57″W
- Country: United States
- State: Virginia
- County: Clarke

Government
  - Mayor: Jay Arnold

Area
  - Total: 2.27 sq mi (5.88 km^{2})
  - Land: 2.27 sq mi (5.88 km^{2})
  - Water: 0 sq mi (0.00 km^{2})
- Elevation: 590 ft (180 m)

Population (2010)
  - Total: 4,574
  - Estimate (2019): 4,371
  - Density: 1,926.3/sq mi (743.73/km^{2})
- Time zone: UTC−5 (Eastern (EST))
  - Summer (DST): UTC−4 (EDT)
- ZIP code: 22611
- Area code: 540
- FIPS code: 51-06968
- GNIS feature ID: 1498453
- Website: www.berryvilleva.gov

Berryville is an incorporated town in and the county seat of Clarke County, Virginia, United States. The population was 4,574 at the 2020 census, up from 4,185 at the 2010 census.

== History ==
Berryville was founded at the intersection of the Winchester Turnpike and Charlestown Road. The land was first granted by the Crown to Captain Isaac Pennington in 1734, and George Washington surveyed it on October 23, 1750. In 1754, Pennington sold the land to Colonel John Hite.

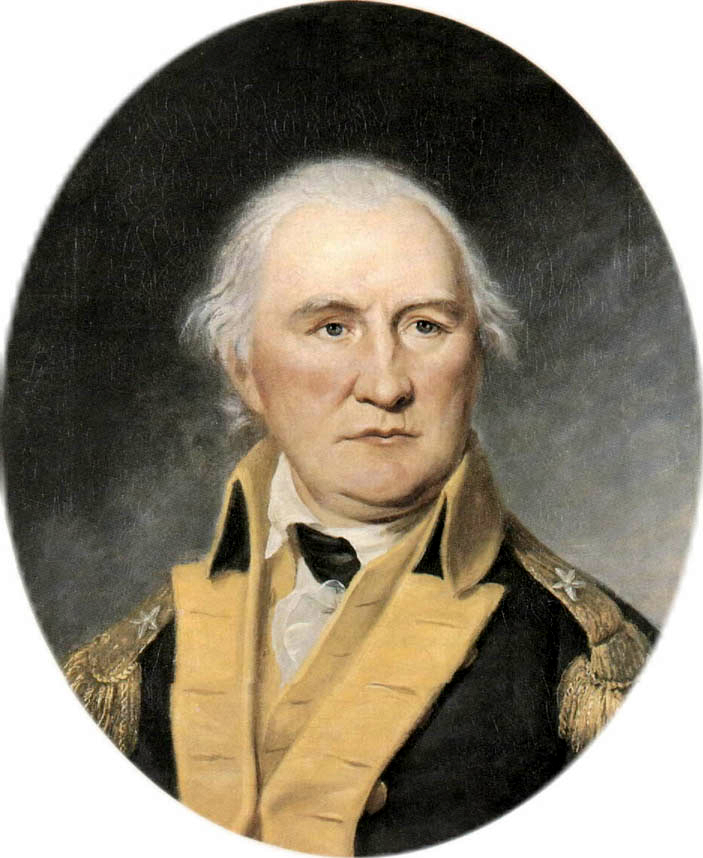
Early resident Col. Daniel Morgan

According to legend, Daniel Morgan would engage in combat with young toughs at the intersection, having first piled large stones nearby to use as ammunition in case of need. Because of this story, and a rowdy tavern nearby, the area was first given the informal name of "Battle Town".

Hite sold the tract in 1765 to his son-in-law, Major Charles Smith. Smith named his estate "Battle Town", and on the site of the former tavern he built a clapboard homestead. This structure still stands on what is now Main Street and is now known as "The Nook".

Daniel Morgan returned to the area after distinguishing himself in the Revolution, living at Saratoga, and briefly at Soldier's Rest. He was one of the frequent (and reputedly most quarrelsome) patrons of the new tavern (where now stands the Battletown Inn).

Major Smith's son, John Smith, in 1797 sold 20 acres (81,000 m^{2}) of his inheritance to Benjamin Berry and Sarah (Berry) Stribling, who divided it into lots for a town. It was established as the town of Berryville on January 15, 1798.

By 1810, the town had at least 25 homes, three stores, an apothecary (pharmacy), two taverns, and an academy (school). It was not much larger when it was designated as the county seat of newly formed Clarke County in 1836. An 1855 gazetteer described it as "a small town" that "has some trade, and contains an academy and 1 or 2 churches."

In the Gettysburg Campaign, the town was used as an outpost supporting Winchester during Second Battle of Winchester. In 1864 General Jubal A. Early briefly had his headquarters in the town. Not long afterward the Battle of Berryville was fought in and around the town during the Valley Campaigns of 1864.

The railroad reached the town in the 1870s. It is today part of Norfolk Southern's busy H-Line.

Virginia governor and U.S. senator Harry F. Byrd long resided in Berryville. A state senator in 1916, he built a log cabin named "Westwood" (a name he also gave his daughter) in Berryville at a family-owned orchard. The cabin was constructed from chestnut logs prior to the chestnut blight. In 1926, Byrd purchased Rosemont, an estate adjacent to his family's apple orchards in Berryville. He moved there with his family after his term as governor ended in 1929.

== Geography ==
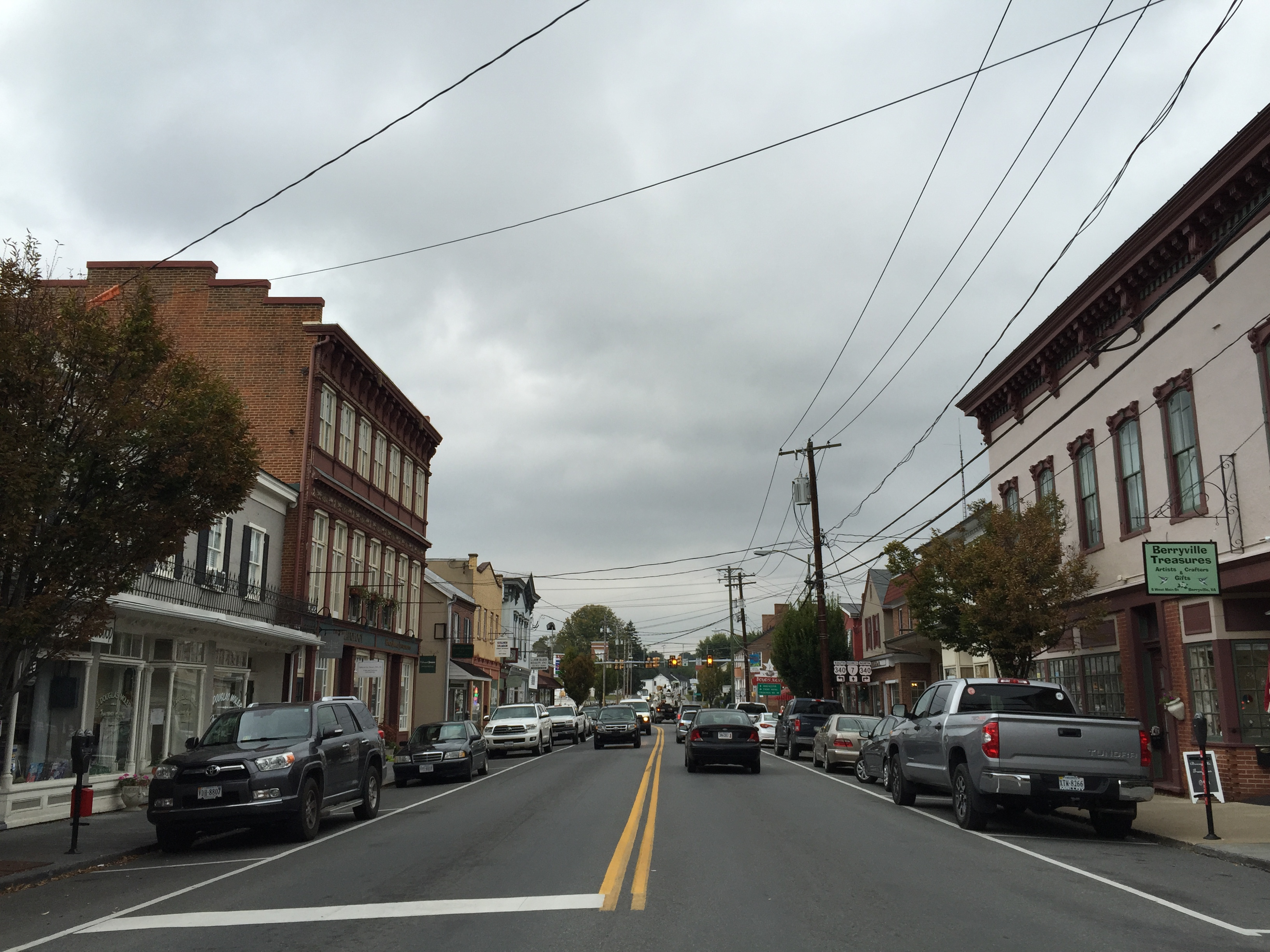
View down Main Street (SR 7 Bus) in Berryville

Berryville is located in the northern Shenandoah Valley, 11 miles (18 km) east of Winchester and 5 miles (8 km) south of the West Virginia border. U.S. Route 340 passes through the center of town, leading northeast 12 miles (19 km) to Charles Town, West Virginia, and southwest 22 miles (35 km) to Front Royal. Virginia State Route 7 bypasses Berryville along its northern border as a four-lane freeway, leading west to Winchester and east across the Blue Ridge Mountains 24 miles (39 km) to Leesburg.

According to the United States Census Bureau, Berryville has a total area of 2.3 square miles (5.9 km^{2}), all land.

== Demographics ==
Historical population
Census	Pop.	Note	%±
1860	356		—
1870	580		62.9%
1900	938		—
1910	876		−6.6%
1920	1,138		29.9%
1930	1,094		−3.9%
1940	1,262		15.4%
1950	1,401		11.0%
1960	1,645		17.4%
1970	1,569		−4.6%
1980	1,752		11.7%
1990	3,097		76.8%
2000	2,963		−4.3%
2010	4,185		41.2%
2020	4,574		9.3%
U.S. Decennial Census

=== 2020 census ===
As of the 2020 census, Berryville had a population of 4,574. The median age was 45.8 years. 22.1% of residents were under the age of 18 and 21.8% of residents were 65 years of age or older. For every 100 females there were 88.3 males, and for every 100 females age 18 and over there were 85.7 males age 18 and over.

0.0% of residents lived in urban areas, while 100.0% lived in rural areas.

There were 1,783 households in Berryville, of which 30.8% had children under the age of 18 living in them. Of all households, 46.4% were married-couple households, 16.9% were households with a male householder and no spouse or partner present, and 32.1% were households with a female householder and no spouse or partner present. About 31.0% of all households were made up of individuals and 15.5% had someone living alone who was 65 years of age or older.

There were 1,892 housing units, of which 5.8% were vacant. The homeowner vacancy rate was 2.5% and the rental vacancy rate was 3.8%.

Racial composition as of the 2020 census
Race	Number	Percent
White	3,651	79.8%
Black or African American	309	6.8%
American Indian and Alaska Native	9	0.2%
Asian	100	2.2%
Native Hawaiian and Other Pacific Islander	4	0.1%
Some other race	138	3.0%
Two or more races	363	7.9%
Hispanic or Latino (of any race)	309	6.8%

=== 2000 census ===
As of the census of 2000, there were 2,963 people, 1,239 households, and 783 families residing in the town. The population density was 1,648.3 people per square mile (635.6/km^{2}). There were 1,312 housing units at an average density of 729.8 per square mile (281.4/km^{2}). The racial makeup of the town was 84.54% White, 13.60% African American, 0.10% Native American, 0.57% Asian, 0.13% from other races, and 1.05% from two or more races. Hispanic or Latino of any race were 1.32% of the population.

There were 1,239 households, out of which 28.6% had children under the age of 18 living with them, 46.7% were married couples living together, 13.1% had a female householder with no husband present, and 36.8% were non-families. 32.8% of all households were made up of individuals, and 18.6% had someone living alone who was 65 years of age or older. The average household size was 2.28 and the average family size was 2.90.

In the town, the population was spread out, with 23.1% under the age of 18, 5.7% from 18 to 24, 27.3% from 25 to 44, 21.5% from 45 to 64, and 22.5% who were 65 years of age or older. The median age was 41 years. For every 100 females, there were 81.2 males. For every 100 females age 18 and over, there were 74.1 males.

The median income for a household in the town was $39,871, and the median income for a family was $52,176. Males had a median income of $38,750 versus $26,531 for females. The per capita income for the town was $20,337. About 4.1% of families and 7.0% of the population were below the poverty line, including 6.5% of those under age 18 and 16.3% of those age 65 or over.

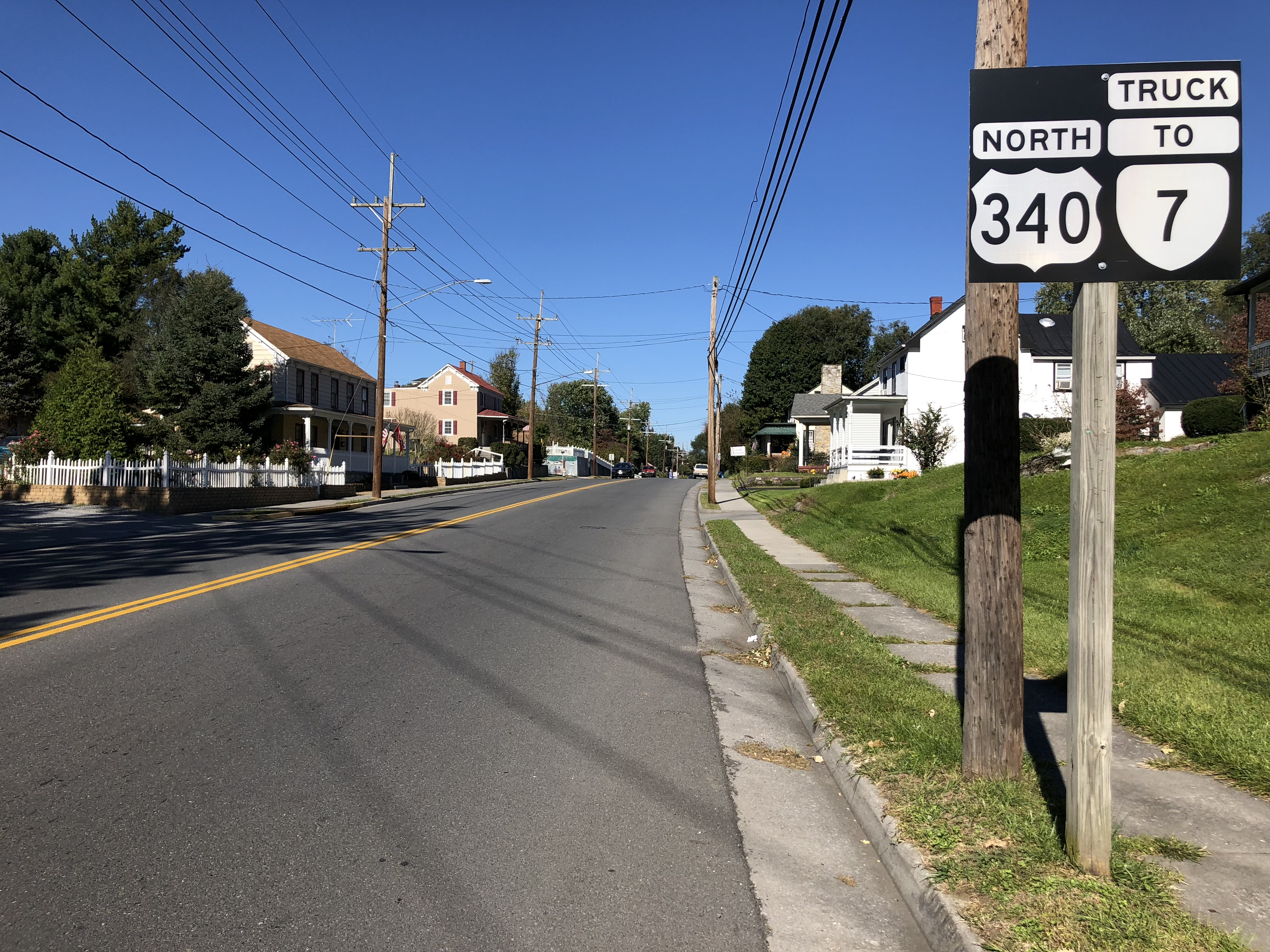
US 340 in Berryville

== Transportation ==
Berryville is located at the intersection of U.S. Route 340 and Virginia State Route 7. US 340 passes through the center of town, extending southwest to Front Royal and northeast to Charles Town. SR 7 bypasses the town just to the north, extending west to Winchester and east to Leesburg. US 340 also connects to Interstate 66 near Front Royal while SR 7 has a junction with Interstate 81 near Winchester. While SR 7 now bypasses downtown Berryville, SR 7 Business still passes through via Main Street.

== Education ==
Berryville is home to D.G. Cooley Elementary School, Johnson Williams Middle School and Clarke County High School.

== Climate ==
The climate in this area is characterized by hot, humid summers and generally mild to cool winters. According to the Köppen Climate Classification system, Berryville has a humid subtropical climate, abbreviated "Cfa" on climate maps.

Climate data for Berryville, Virginia
Month	Jan	Feb	Mar	Apr	May	Jun	Jul	Aug	Sep	Oct	Nov	Dec	Year
Record high °F (°C)	76 (24)	81 (27)	86 (30)	93 (34)	95 (35)	99 (37)	102 (39)	103 (39)	102 (39)	92 (33)	85 (29)	78 (26)	103 (39)
Mean daily maximum °F (°C)	40 (4)	45 (7)	54 (12)	65 (18)	74 (23)	82 (28)	86 (30)	84 (29)	78 (26)	66 (19)	55 (13)	45 (7)	65 (18)
Daily mean °F (°C)	31 (−1)	35 (2)	43 (6)	53 (12)	62 (17)	71 (22)	75 (24)	73 (23)	67 (19)	54 (12)	45 (7)	36 (2)	54 (12)
Mean daily minimum °F (°C)	21 (−6)	24 (−4)	31 (−1)	40 (4)	50 (10)	59 (15)	64 (18)	62 (17)	55 (13)	42 (6)	34 (1)	26 (−3)	42 (6)
Record low °F (°C)	−13 (−25)	−10 (−23)	−5 (−21)	18 (−8)	26 (−3)	37 (3)	42 (6)	39 (4)	28 (−2)	17 (−8)	6 (−14)	−8 (−22)	−13 (−25)
Average precipitation inches (mm)	2.8 (71)	2.4 (61)	3.1 (79)	3.0 (76)	3.7 (94)	3.5 (89)	4.1 (100)	3.3 (84)	3.3 (84)	3.4 (86)	3.1 (79)	2.5 (64)	38.2 (967)
Source: weather.com

== Notable buildings or structures in Berryville ==
- J & L Pie Co. - Established in 1899
- Clarke County High School
- Holy Cross Abbey - Trappist monastery
- Soldier's Rest - 1769
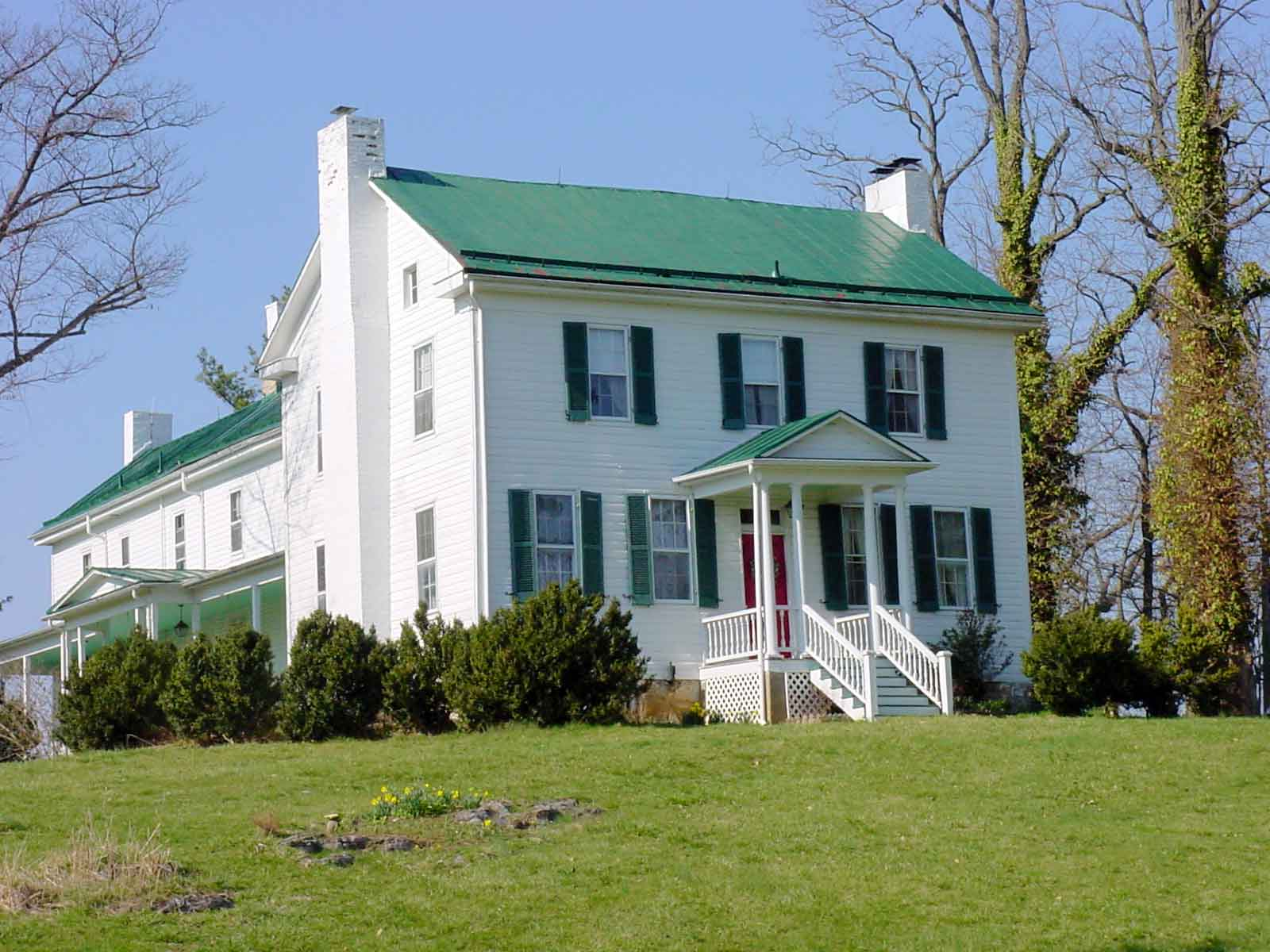
  Soldier's Rest
- Historic Rosemont Manor - former home of Governor and U.S. Senator Harry F. Byrd

In addition to Soldier's Rest, the Berryville Historic District, Chapel Hill, Clermont, Cool Spring Battlefield, Fairfield, Glendale Farm, Josephine City School, Long Marsh Run Rural Historic District, Norwood, Old Clarke County Courthouse, Smithfield Farm, and Wickliffe Church are listed on the National Register of Historic Places.

== Notable people ==
- Harry F. Byrd, Virginia governor and U.S. senator
- Rennie Davis, 1960s anti-war organizer; Chicago Seven defendant; author
- Drew Gilpin Faust, president of Harvard University
- James Noble, first U.S. senator for Indiana
- Noah Noble, brother of James Noble and a Whig Party governor of Indiana
- Forrest Pritchard, New York Times bestselling author and sustainable farmer
- Oliver North, former US Marine Corps lieutenant colonel involved in the Iran–Contra affair; Fox News analyst
- James T. S. Taylor, Virginia politician
- Lloyd W. Williams, Marine officer who died in World War I, credited with saying "Retreat? Hell, we just got here!"

== See also ==
- Mount Weather Emergency Operations Center
