= Josephine City School =

- U.S. National Register of Historic Places
- Virginia Landmarks Register
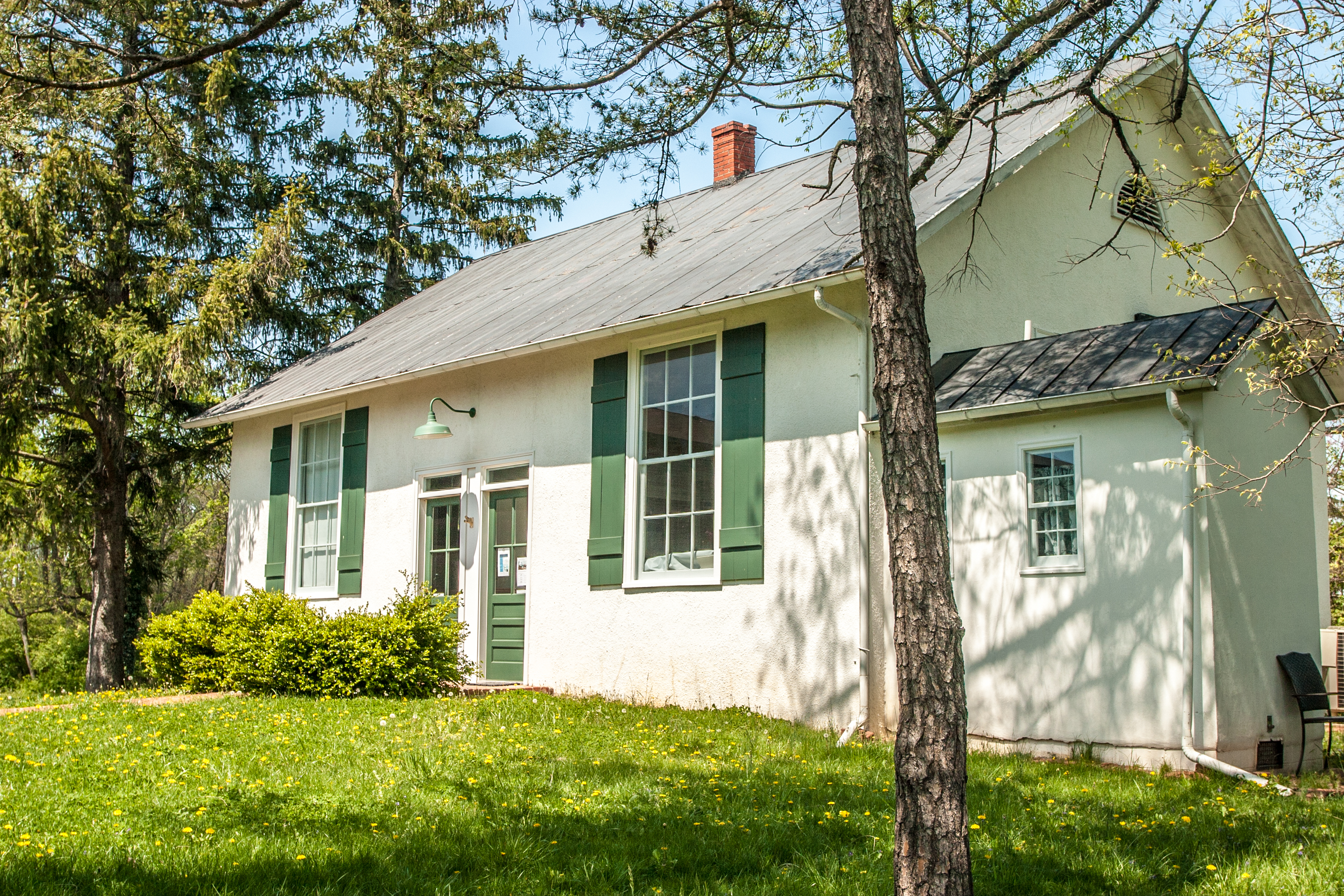
- Josephine City School, April 2013

- Location within Northern Virginia Location within Virginia Location within the United States
- Location: 301-A Josephine St., Berryville, Virginia
- Coordinates: 39°08′28″N 77°58′46″W
- Area: less than one acre
- Built: 1882
- NRHP reference No.: 95000397
- VLR No.: 168-5027

Significant dates
- Added to NRHP: April 7, 1995
- Designated VLR: February 14, 1995

Josephine City School is a historic school building for African-American children located at Berryville, Clarke County, Virginia. It was built about 1882, and is a rectangular, one-story, frame building with a gable roof and a four-bay side gable entrance facade. The school measures approximately 40 feet long and 30 feet wide. It is part of a school complex for African American children that included the Josephine City School; the 1930 brick Clarke County Training School; and a 1941 frame building that was constructed as additional agriculture classrooms. It was used as an elementary school until 1930, when it was moved a short distance from its original location, and used as the Clarke County Training School's home economics and agriculture classrooms. It was used for classrooms until 1971, when it was turned into storage space, after which it was converted into low/moderate-income elderly housing.

It was listed on the National Register of Historic Places in 1995.

Part of the building now houses the Josephine School Community Museum and Clarke County African-American Cultural Center. Opened in 2003, the museum displays the history of Clarke County's African-American community.
