= Old Clarke County Courthouse (Virginia) =

Historic courthouse in Virginia, US

- U.S. National Register of Historic Places
- Virginia Landmarks Register
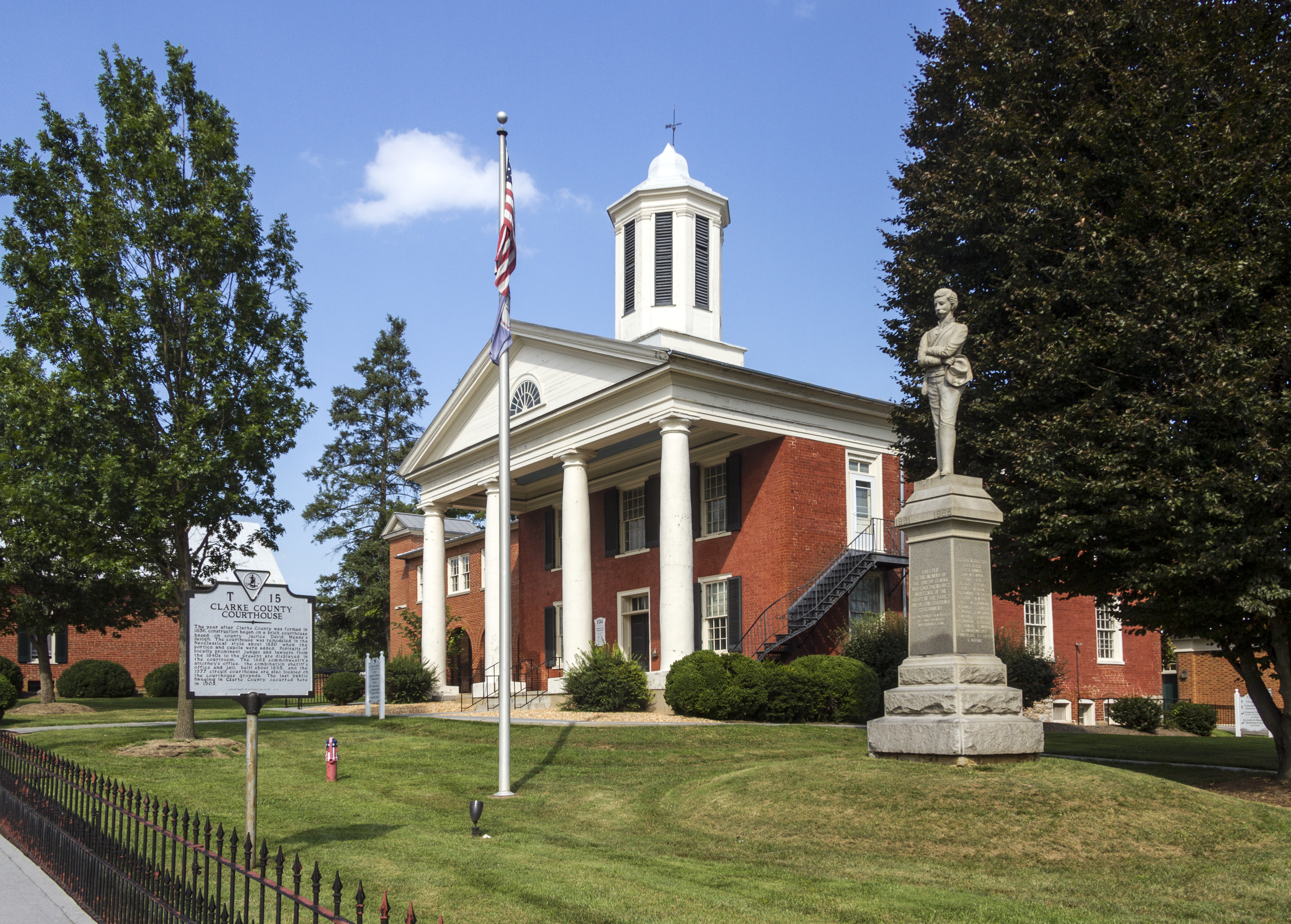
- Old Clarke County Courthouse, 2012

- Location within Northern Virginia Location within Virginia Location within the United States
- Location: 104 N. Church St., Berryville, Virginia
- Coordinates: 39°9′6″N 77°58′51″W
- Area: 1 acre (0.40 ha)
- Built: 1837
- Architect: Meade, David
- Architectural style: Roman Revival
- NRHP reference No.: 83003277
- VLR No.: 168-0001

Significant dates
- Added to NRHP: July 7, 1983
- Designated VLR: September 16, 1982

The Old Clarke County Courthouse is a historic county courthouse complex located at Berryville, Clarke County, Virginia. The complex includes the Old Clarke County Courthouse, built in 1837; the original county clerk's building, dating from the 1880s; and a two-story building built about 1900 and containing the Sheriff's office and county jail. The former courthouse is a two-story, red brick temple-form structure, fronted by a full-height Tuscan order portico in the Roman Revival style. The building served as the county's courthouse until 1977, when a new courthouse was erected. It was subsequently designated the General District Courts Building.

It was listed on the National Register of Historic Places in 1983.
