= Charles A. Ford (Virginia politician) =

American politician

Member of the Virginia House of Delegates for Clarke and Warren Counties
- In office January 11, 1922 – January 8, 1924
- Preceded by: Kenneth N. Gilpin
- Succeeded by: not applicable

Personal details
- Born: Charles A. Ford; August 28, 1855 Frederick County, Virginia, US
- Died: December 18, 1933 (aged 78) Front Royal, Virginia, US
- Party: Democratic
- Spouse: Annie S. Sprint
- Children: 5 daughters, son
- Education: Shenandoah Valley Academy
- Profession: merchant, real estate dealer, Baptist leader, politician

Charles A. Ford (August 28, 1855 – December 18, 1933) was a merchant, politician and active Baptist who served a single term in the Virginia House of Delegates representing Clarke and Warren Counties.

== Early life, education and family ==
Born in Frederick County, Virginia to former Maryland farmer William Ford (1810-1889) and his wife Susan (1826-1869). Five years later, in the 1860 census, his large family included two older sisters (Susan, age 16, and Anna, age 7), as well as older brothers Jonaz and Benjamin (aged 14 and 13, respectively) and a younger sister Elenora (age 1) as well as his Pennsylvania-born grandfather Joseph (aged 78) and Maryland-born grandmother Sarah (also 78, who like her husband died in 1861) and a couple of aunts and cousins. This family does not appear not related to pioneering Virginia Baptist Rev. Reuben Pleasant Ford Sr. (1742-1823), co-founder of the first Separate Baptist Association and later for 30 years clerk of the Dover Baptist Association, who had several sons and whose descendants moved to Frederick County as well as Kentucky by the American Civil War. After the conflict, during which various sections of Frederick County changed hands dozens of times and raids were common but which his older brothers also survived, his father operated Ford's mill east of Frederick County in Clarke County's Chapel district. Charles was educated at what was then the Shenandoah Valley Academy near Winchester, Virginia (probably the Shenandoah Valley Military Academy, since Seventh Day Adventists decades later founded the modern Shenandoah Valley Academy, a boarding school near New Market, Virginia). In 1880 his family still included a younger brother and several sisters.

In 1881 Ford married Annie S. Sprint, with whom he had a son who died as a child, and at least five daughters: Ruth Ford Kamp (1883-1981), Susan Ford Dickinson (1885-1980), Louisa Ford Waller (1889-1982), Esther Ford Brooke MacAtee (1892-1982) and Anna Blanch Ford Coe (1897-1988).

== Career ==
As an adult, Ford became a merchant and dealt in real estate, including selling his late father's mill to C.C. Robinson circa 1920. Ford also was active in his church and served as clerk and moderator of the Shenandoah Baptist Association, which had been formed in 1882 at Bethel Memorial Church in Clarke County (shortly before the first Congress of Virginia Baptists at Lynchburg in 1883), and now consists of about 17 churches in Virginia and West Virginia. In 1895 and 1897, when Democrat Grover Cleveland was President, Ford was the postmaster at Boyce in Clarke County, but by 1910 he had moved to Front Royal in neighboring Warren County, and their daughter Susan had become a schoolteacher.

Voters from Clarke and adjacent Warren County elected Ford as their (part-time) representative in the Virginia House of Delegates in 1921 (for the term beginning in January 1922). One newspaper attributed his election in part because the leading candidate for the seat, John C. Lee, had been run over and killed by a train shortly before the legislative filing deadline for the Democratic primary in Warren county. Ford won every precinct in Clarke County, which gave him the margin in the general election to defeat John H. Downing, who had carried all but five precincts in Warren County. Ford chose not to run for re-election, probably because fellow legislators split the district in census based reapportionment before the 1923 election. Warren County was added Page County, which was split from Rappahannock County (which instead was combined with Culpeper County), and Clarke County was added to the district with Frederick County to the north (and the independent city of Winchester), so Boyd R. Richards of Winchester was elected to the northern district in 1923 and banker and fellow Baptist W.M. Long of Luray to the more southern of the new districts.

== Death ==
Ford died in Front Royal, Virginia on December 18, 1933.
