= Kenneth N. Gilpin =

American politician (1890–1947)

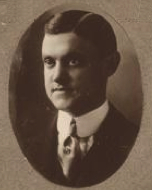

Member of the Virginia House of Delegates for Clarke and Warren Counties
- In office January 12, 1916 – January 10, 1922
- Preceded by: Aubrey G. Weaver
- Succeeded by: Charles A. Ford

Personal details
- Born: Kenneth Newcomer Gilpin; February 14, 1890 Baltimore, Maryland
- Died: June 21, 1947 (aged 57) Manhattan, New York City
- Resting place: Old Chapel cemetery, Millwood, Virginia
- Party: Democratic
- Spouse: Isabella McGhee Tyson
- Children: 3
- Education: University of Virginia
- Profession: businessman, horseman, politician

Military service
- Allegiance: United States of America
- Branch/service: U.S. Army
- Rank: Major
- Battles/wars: World War I, World War II

Kenneth Newcomer Gilpin (February 14, 1890 – June 21, 1947) was a military aviator in both World War I and World War II, who served three-terms in the Virginia House of Delegates and bred thoroughbred horses.

== Early life ==
Gilpin was born in Baltimore to Hattie Newcomer, an heiress, and Henry Brooke Gilpin, a local merchant. His father's family could trace their ancestry to the American Revolutionary War and a farm near Bedford, Pennsylvania, as well as the distinguished Brooke family of Maryland. By 1907 his mother desired a country estate, and the family moved to Scaleby, an estate home and farm located in Clarke County, Virginia, by 1911; Scaleby, later added to the National Register of Historic Places, is named for the ancestral Gilpin family estate in Britain.

Gilpin attended the Gilman's School, then St. James School, before attending the University of Virginia.

== Military career ==
In 1916, Gilpin privately trained in Plattsburg, New York at a camp for citizen soldiers before joining the Naval Flying Corps. Gilpin fought in World War I as a naval aviator. When World War II broke out, Gilpin joined the military again, as a major in the Air Corps.

== Business career ==
Upon moving to Virginia's Shenandoah Valley, Gilpin bred horses.

Voters from Clarke and adjacent Warren county elected him as their representative in the Virginia House of Delegates in 1915, and re-elected him until 1922. He later become a member of the state Highway Commission, and attended the opening of the new bridges across the Shenandoah River at Front Royal, Virginia in November 2941 in that capacity.

After retiring from active politics, Gilpin concentrated on breeding thoroughbred racehorses. He bought Fasig-Tipton, then a venerable auction company (founded in 1898) which had run the Saratoga yearling sales since World War I (their most famous auctioned horse being Man o'War in 1918); on his death in 1958, his son would succeed him, but was less successful and he ultimately left the auction business, instead founding the Stallion Service Bureau in 1960 to act as agent for others, matching thoroughbred dams and sires. Gilpin's most famous stud horse was Teddy, which he imported from France in 1931 and which sired more than 65 stakes winners. Although the Scaleby estate was once 200 acres, by 1941, when Gilpin helped found the Virginia Thoroughbred Association and became its first president, he listed his address as the approximately 50 acre Kentmere estate.

== Personal life ==
In 1913, Gilpin met Isabella McGhee Tyson, the daughter of future Brigadier General and U.S. Senator Lawrence Tyson, at a party at the University of Virginia. The couple married four years later. Tyson's brother McGhee Tyson was a friend of Gilpin's, and the two both fought in World War I. McGhee Tyson died after crashing into the North Sea a month before the armistice.

The couple had three children: McGhee Tyson Gilpin (1919–2000), Kenneth N. Gilpin II (1923-1996), and Betty Brooke Gilpin (b. 1935). Both of Gilpin's sons served in World War II alongside him. Gilpin's granddaughter through his son McGhee is Drew Gilpin Faust, a former president of Harvard University. His son Kenneth later married Lucy Trumbull Mitchell, the daughter of Billy Mitchell and step-daughter of Capt. Thomas Bolling Byrd, the brother of Harry Flood Byrd Sr.; Gilpin's grandsons through son Kenneth are Jack Gilpin, actor, and Kenneth N. Gilpin III, a journalist who wrote business and finance stories for The New York Times for 25 years.

Gilpin was active in veterans' organizations, the Episcopal Church, Blue Ridge Hunt Club, Blue Ridge County Club, Commonwealth Club and Maryland Club.

Gilpin died on June 21, 1947, during a business trip to Manhattan in New York City. His remains were returned to Virginia, where they were buried in historic Old Chapel cemetery in Millwood. His son McGhee Gilpin would continue the family's thoroughbred breeding enterprises while residing at Lakeville nearby. Scaleby remained owned by Gilpin's descendants until 1986. It was put on the National Register for Historic Places in 1990, and is now in the Chapel Rural Historic District. The Gilpin family papers are held by the University of North Carolina.
