= James Hay (politician) =

American politician

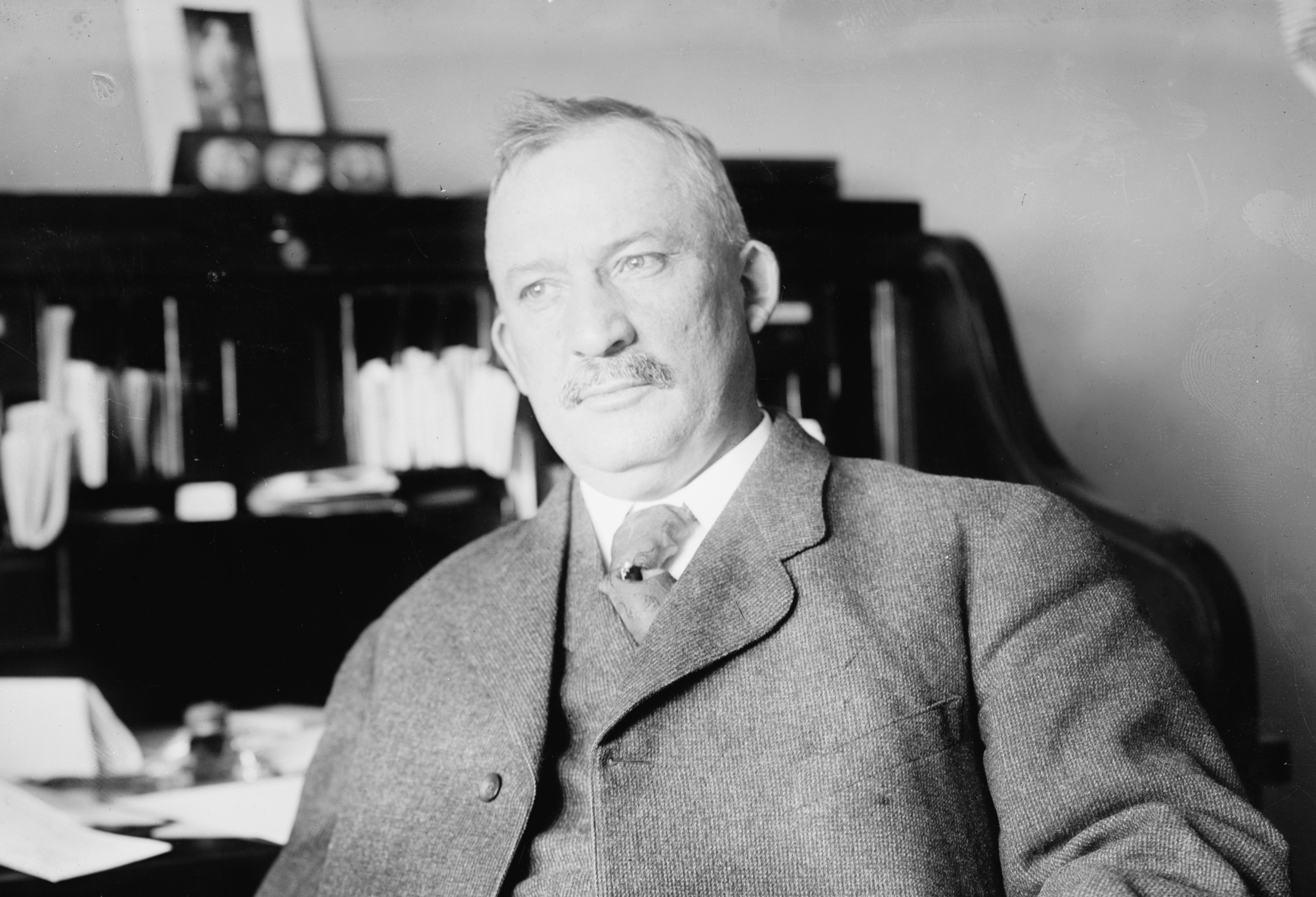
- James Hay in 1910

Senior Judge of the Court of Claims
- In office November 30, 1927 – June 12, 1931

Judge of the Court of Claims
- In office July 17, 1916 – November 30, 1927
- Appointed by: Woodrow Wilson
- Preceded by: George W. Atkinson
- Succeeded by: William R. Green

Member of the U.S. House of Representatives from Virginia's 7th district
- In office March 4, 1897 – October 1, 1916
- Preceded by: Smith S. Turner
- Succeeded by: Thomas W. Harrison

Chairman of the United States House Committee on Military Affairs
- In office March 4, 1911 – October 1, 1916
- Preceded by: John A. T. Hull
- Succeeded by: S. Hubert Dent Jr.

Member of the Virginia Senate from the 15th district
- In office December 6, 1893 – March 4, 1897
- Preceded by: Basil B. Gordon
- Succeeded by: J. L. Jeffries

Member of the Virginia House of Delegates for Greene and Madison
- In office December 2, 1885 – December 1, 1891
- Preceded by: Thomas A. Chapman
- Succeeded by: John C. Utz

Personal details
- Born: James Hay; January 9, 1856 Millwood, Virginia
- Died: June 12, 1931 (aged 75) Madison, Virginia
- Resting place: Cedar Hill Cemetery; Madison, Virginia
- Party: Democratic
- Education: University of Pennsylvania; Washington and Lee University (LL.B.)

James Hay (January 9, 1856 – June 12, 1931) served in both houses of the Virginia General Assembly, was a United States representative from Virginia and a judge of the Court of Claims.

== Education and career ==
Born on January 9, 1856, in Millwood, Clarke County, Virginia, Hay attended private schools, then the University of Pennsylvania and received a Bachelor of Laws in 1877 from the Washington and Lee University School of Law. He was a teacher in Harrisonburg, Virginia from 1877 to 1879. He was admitted to the bar and entered private practice in Harrisonburg from 1877 to 1879. He continued private practice in Madison, Virginia from 1879 to 1897. He was a commonwealth attorney for Madison County, Virginia from 1883 to 1896. He was a member of the Virginia House of Delegates from 1885 to 1891, representing Greene County and Madison County. He was a member of the Senate of Virginia from 1893 to 1897, representing Culpeper County, Rappahannock County, Madison County and Orange County. He was a member of the Democratic State committee in 1888. He was delegate to the Democratic National Convention in 1888.

== Congressional service ==
Hay was elected as a Democrat to the United States House of Representatives of the 55th United States Congress and to the nine succeeding Congresses and served from March 4, 1897, until his resignation on October 1, 1916. He was Chairman of the United States House Committee on Military Affairs for the 62nd through 64th United States Congresses.

=== Military preparedness ===
Hay was involved in the "Preparedness Movement" of 1915 to 1916, and in response to which he drafted and pushed through the National Defense Act of 1916.

== Federal judicial service ==
Hay was nominated by President Woodrow Wilson on July 15, 1916, to a seat on the Court of Claims (later the United States Court of Claims) vacated by Judge George W. Atkinson. He was confirmed by the United States Senate on July 17, 1916, and received his commission the same day. He assumed senior status on November 30, 1927. His service terminated on June 12, 1931, due to his death in Madison. He was interred in Cedar Hill Cemetery in Madison.

== Electoral history ==
- 1896; Hay was elected to the U.S. House of Representatives with 55.81% of the vote, defeating Republican Robert J. Walker, NtD (?) J. Samuel Harrisberger, and Independent John F. Forsyth.
- 1898; Hay was re-elected with 77.05% of the vote, defeating SilD (?) D.C. O'Flaherty.
- 1900; Hay was re-elected with 63.35% of the vote, defeating Republican C.M. Gibbens.
- 1902; Hay was re-elected with 64.68% of the vote, defeating Republican Samuel J. Hoffman.
- 1904; Hay was re-elected with 64.65% of the vote, defeating Republican Charles M. Kelzel.
- 1906; Hay was re-elected unopposed.
- 1908; Hay was re-elected with 62.85% of the vote, defeating Republican L. Pritchard.
- 1910; Hay was re-elected with 57.96% of the vote, defeating Republican John Paul and Independent Hugh S. Lupton.
- 1912; Hay was re-elected with 71.54% of the vote, defeating Republican George N. Earman and Independent E.C. Garrison.
- 1914; Hay was re-elected with 86.96% of the vote, defeating Republican E.C. Garrison.

== Sources ==
- United States Congress. "James Hay (id: H000382)". Biographical Directory of the United States Congress.
- "Hay, James - Federal Judicial Center". www.fjc.gov.

U.S. House of Representatives
Preceded by Smith S. Turner	Member of the U.S. House of Representatives from Virginia's 7th congressional district 1897–1916	Succeeded by Thomas W. Harrison
Legal offices
Preceded by George W. Atkinson	Judge of the Court of Claims; 1916–1927	Succeeded by William R. Green
