= William H. Jeffreys Jr. =

American politician

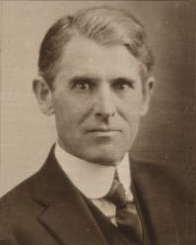

Member of the Virginia Senate from the 7th district
- In office January 9, 1924 – January 13, 1932
- Preceded by: George W. Layman
- Succeeded by: Harvey B. Moseley

Member of the Virginia Senate from the 25th district
- In office January 12, 1916 – January 9, 1924
- Preceded by: William D. Blanks
- Succeeded by: Ward Swank

Personal details
- Born: William Henry Jeffreys; December 17, 1871 Granville, North Carolina, U.S.
- Died: June 3, 1938 (aged 66) Chase City, Virginia, U.S.
- Party: Democratic
- Spouse: Juliet Virginia Goode

William Henry Jeffreys Jr. (December 17, 1871 – June 3, 1938) was an American Democratic politician who served as a member of the Virginia Senate from 1916 to 1932.

Senate of Virginia
Preceded by William D. Blanks	Virginia Senator for the 25th District; 1916–1924	Succeeded by Ward Swank
Preceded by George W. Layman	Virginia Senator for the 7th District; 1924–1932	Succeeded by Harvey B. Moseley
