= Harry Z. Isaacs =

American businessman, philanthropist, and horse breeder

- Born: May 30, 1904; Louisville, Kentucky, US
- Died: September 23, 1990 (aged 86); Glyndon, Maryland, US
- Education: University of Pennsylvania
- Occupation(s): Clothing manufacturer, racehorse owner & breeder, philanthropist
- Known for: Historic Long Branch Estate

Harry Z. Isaacs (May 30, 1904 – September 23, 1990) was a Baltimore, Maryland businessman, a philanthropist, and a major owner and breeder of Thoroughbred racehorses who operated and resided at Brookfield Farm in Glyndon, Maryland. Among his top horses, Isaacs owned Intent, whose wins included back-to-back editions of the San Juan Capistrano Handicap and who went on to sire Intentionally, Isaacs' 1959 American Champion Sprint Horse. Among his other sporting interests, Isaacs served as president of the Maryland Kennel Club for 20 years and was a key figure in the introduction of the Rottweiler breed to the United States.

== Philanthropy ==
In 1986, Harry Isaacs acquired Long Branch Estate near Millwood, Virginia. Listed on the National Register of Historic Places, Isaacs undertook a full restoration of the house designed in part by Benjamin Henry Latrobe whose construction began in 1811. Diagnosed with terminal cancer, Isaacs set up a non-profit foundation to which he donated the entire 400-acre property to be operated as a museum. Following his death in 1990, Long Branch was opened to the public on April 3, 1993.

Isaacs also established a scholarship fund to benefit the children of persons who worked for his companies and for graduates of public high schools in the city of Baltimore, Maryland.
