= Millwood Commercial Historic District =

Historic district in Virginia, United States

- U.S. National Register of Historic Places
- U.S. Historic district
- Virginia Landmarks Register
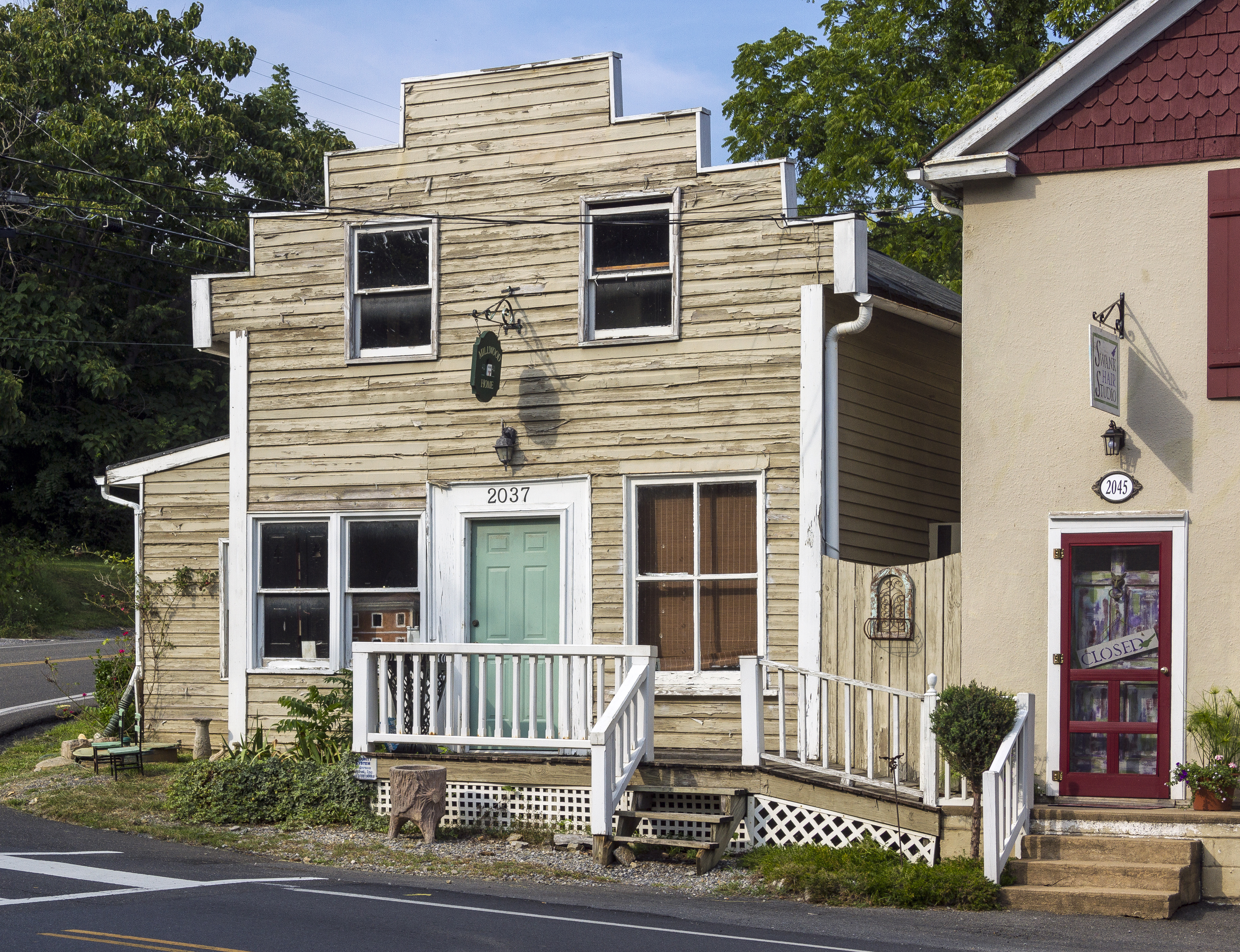
- Downtown Millwood, August 2012

- Location within Northern Virginia Location within Virginia Location within the United States
- Location: Parts of Millwood Rd. and Tannery Ln., Millwood, Virginia
- Coordinates: 39°4′18″N 78°2′18″W
- Area: 4.3 acres (1.7 ha)
- Built: 1782
- NRHP reference No.: 05001624
- VLR No.: 021-5009

Significant dates
- Added to NRHP: January 31, 2006
- Designated VLR: December 7, 2005

Millwood Commercial Historic District is a national historic district located at Millwood, Clarke County, Virginia.

Millwood developed after the American Revolutionary War around the Burwell-Morgan Mill (1782-1785; listed in the NRHP since 1969), along Spout Run and one of the largest in the area. It is near several roads important in the colonial era, including Route 17 and Route 340. Col. Nathaniel Burwell (1750-1814), who owned over 5,000 acres in the agriculturally productive area constructed it with General Daniel Morgan (1736-1802) as his business partner. The mill had become derelict by the 1940s, when it was acquired by the Clarke County Historical Association, which restored it and operates it as a living history museum.

This district includes 10 additional contributing buildings in the village of Millwood. They include a log building (c. 1800) that was originally part of a tannery along Spout Run and later used a tollhouse; a log building (c. 1805) that was used to store liquor and was later converted into a residence; the frame miller's house (c. 1830 located directly south of the mill); a brick store (c. 1836 that partially burned in 1935 and still functions as a store). The remaining buildings are associated with the village's commercial core in the late 19th and early 20th centuries: a 1-story stone and frame outbuilding that may have once been used as a cooper's shop; a frame, 1 ½-story, late-19th century commercial building; a 1 ½-story frame commercial building that once housed the Millwood post office (c. 1900); a 1-story, formed concrete block building (constructed ca. 1928, as a car showroom and now used as an antique shop); and a 1-story, brick former service station (c. 1930) that has housed the post office since 1985. The commercial buildings are directly visible from the mill and the district was drawn to exclude residential, religious and educational buildings.

It was listed on the National Register of Historic Places in 2006. In 2014, the Chapel Rural Historic District was added to the National Register, and had been added to the Virginia Historic Register, encompassing nearly 11,500 acres and nearly 700 contributing properties, including residential, educational and religious buildings excluded by this entry.
