= Boyd R. Richards =

American politician

Member of the Virginia House of Delegates for Winchester and Clarke and Frederick Counties
- In office January 9, 1924 – January 12, 1926
- Preceded by: Charles A. Ford
- Succeeded by: Robert T. Barton Jr.

Personal details
- Born: Charles A. Ford; August 28, 1855 Frederick County, Virginia
- Died: March 12, 1967 (aged 79) Melbourne, Brevard County, Florida
- Resting place: Mt. Hebron Cemetery, Winchester, Virginia
- Party: Democratic
- Spouse: Mary Shyrock
- Children: 2 daughters
- Education: Shenandoah Valley Military Academy
- Alma mater: George Washington University
- Profession: realtor, politician

Boyd Ross Richards (January 15, 1888 – December 18, 1933) was a realtor and politician who served one term in the Virginia House of Delegates representing his native Frederick and nearby Clarke Counties as well as Winchester (the Frederick County seat and an independent city in its own right).

Voters in his native Frederick County and Winchester as well as neighboring Clarke County elected him as their (part-time) representative in the Virginia General Assembly.

He married Mary Shyrock, who bore at least two daughters.

Around 1935, he moved to Florida, where he died nearly three decades later. His remains were returned for burial at Winchester's historic Mt. Hebron Cemetery.
