= John Utz =

John Utz may refer to:

- John Utz (coach), American football, baseball, and basketball coach
- John C. Utz, member of the Virginia House of Delegates
