= Virginia Commission for the Blind =

Historic building in Virginia, US

- U.S. National Register of Historic Places
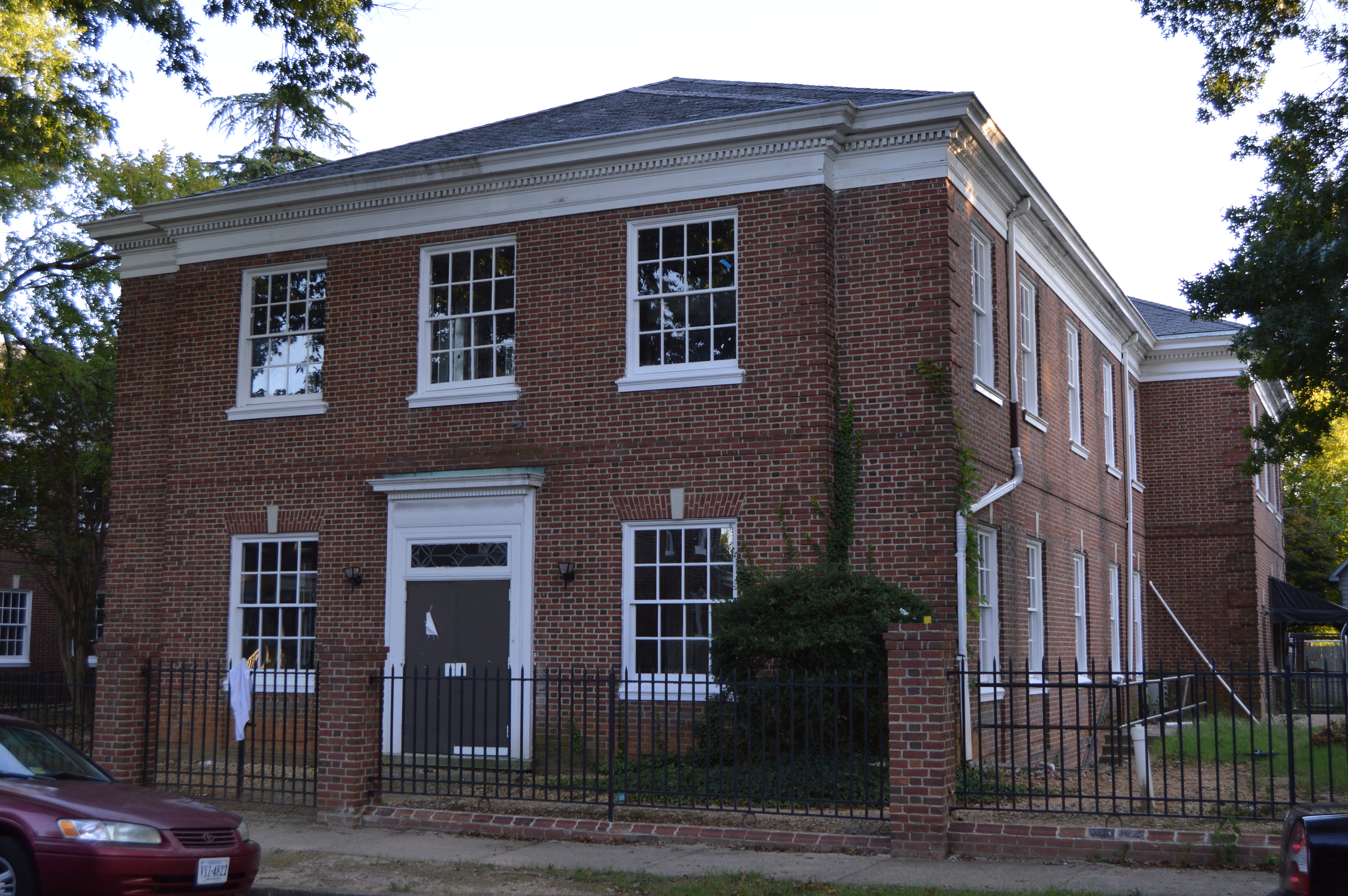

- Location within Virginia Location within the United States
- Location: 3003 Parkwood Ave., Richmond, Virginia
- Coordinates: 37°33′6″N 77°28′47″W
- Area: less than one acre
- Built: 1940
- Architect: J. Binford Walford
- Architectural style: Colonial Revival
- NRHP reference No.: 16000800
- Added to NRHP: November 22, 2016

The Virginia Commission for the Blind is a historic building at 3003 Parkwood Avenue in Richmond, Virginia. It is a U-shaped two-story brick building with Colonial and Georgian Revival features. It was designed by the prominent Virginia architect J. Binford Walford and completed in 1940. It is prominent as the principal place associated with the work of Lucian Louis Watts, a leading force in the state to improve the social welfare of its blind population. Watts was involved in the founding of state and national organizations for the blind, namely, the Virginia Association of Workers for the Blind (now Virginia Industries for the Blind), the Virginia Commission for the Blind (now the Virginia Department for the Blind and Vision Impaired), and the American Foundation for the Blind.

The building was listed on the National Register of Historic Places in 2016.

== See also ==
- National Register of Historic Places listings in Richmond, Virginia
