= Riverview Cemetery, Charlottesville =

Cemetery in Charlottesville, Virginia

Riverview Cemetery
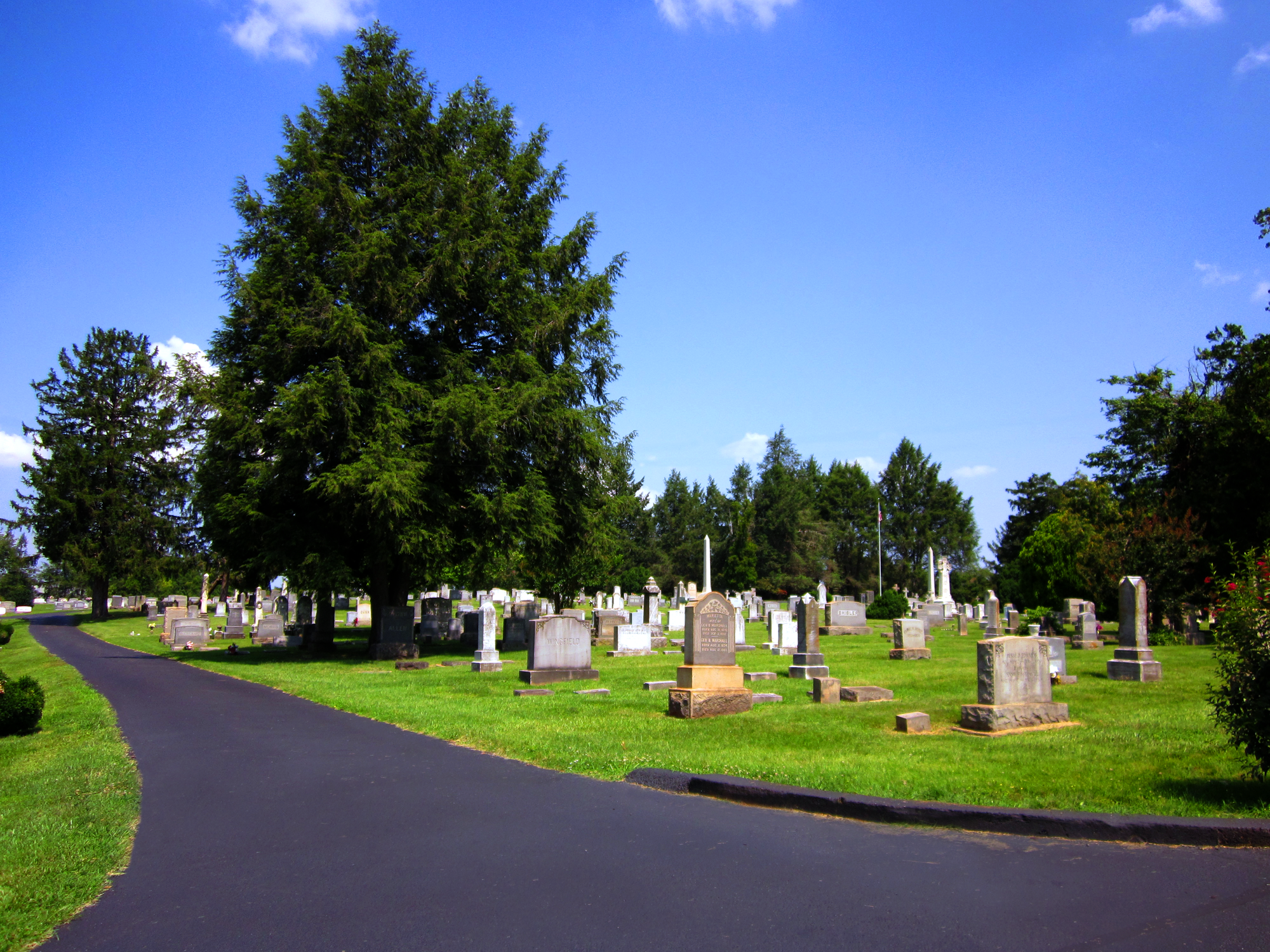
- Riverview Cemetery
- Interactive map of Riverview Cemetery

Details
- Established: 1892
- Location: Charlottesville, Virginia
- Country: United States
- Coordinates: 38°01′31″N 78°27′29″W
- Type: Private
- Owned by: Riverview Cemetery Company
- Size: about 50 acres
- No. of graves: about 12,000
- Website: riverviewcemeteryva.com
- Find a Grave: Riverview Cemetery

Riverview Cemetery is a private cemetery located in the Woolen Mills section of Charlottesville, Virginia, at 1701 Chesapeake Street. Founded in 1892 as Charlottesville's two public cemeteries—Maplewood and Oakwood—were filling up, Riverview consists of about 50 acres overlooking a bend in the Rivanna River and has approximately 12,000 graves with room for about 7,000 more.

== Notable burials ==
Some notable people interred here include:

- John Wood Fishburne (1868–1937) US Congressman
- Nicholas Lewis (1734–1808), an officer in the American Revolution and friend of Thomas Jefferson
- Lucian Louis Watts (1888-1974), a pioneering advocate for blind Virginians and a member of the Virginia House of Delegates
- Thomas L. Rosser (1836–1910) who was a General for the Confederate States of America and later an officer in the Spanish–American War
- Virginia State Senator Emily Couric (1947–2001)
