= Thomas W. Harrison =

American politician (1856–1935)

Thomas Harrison
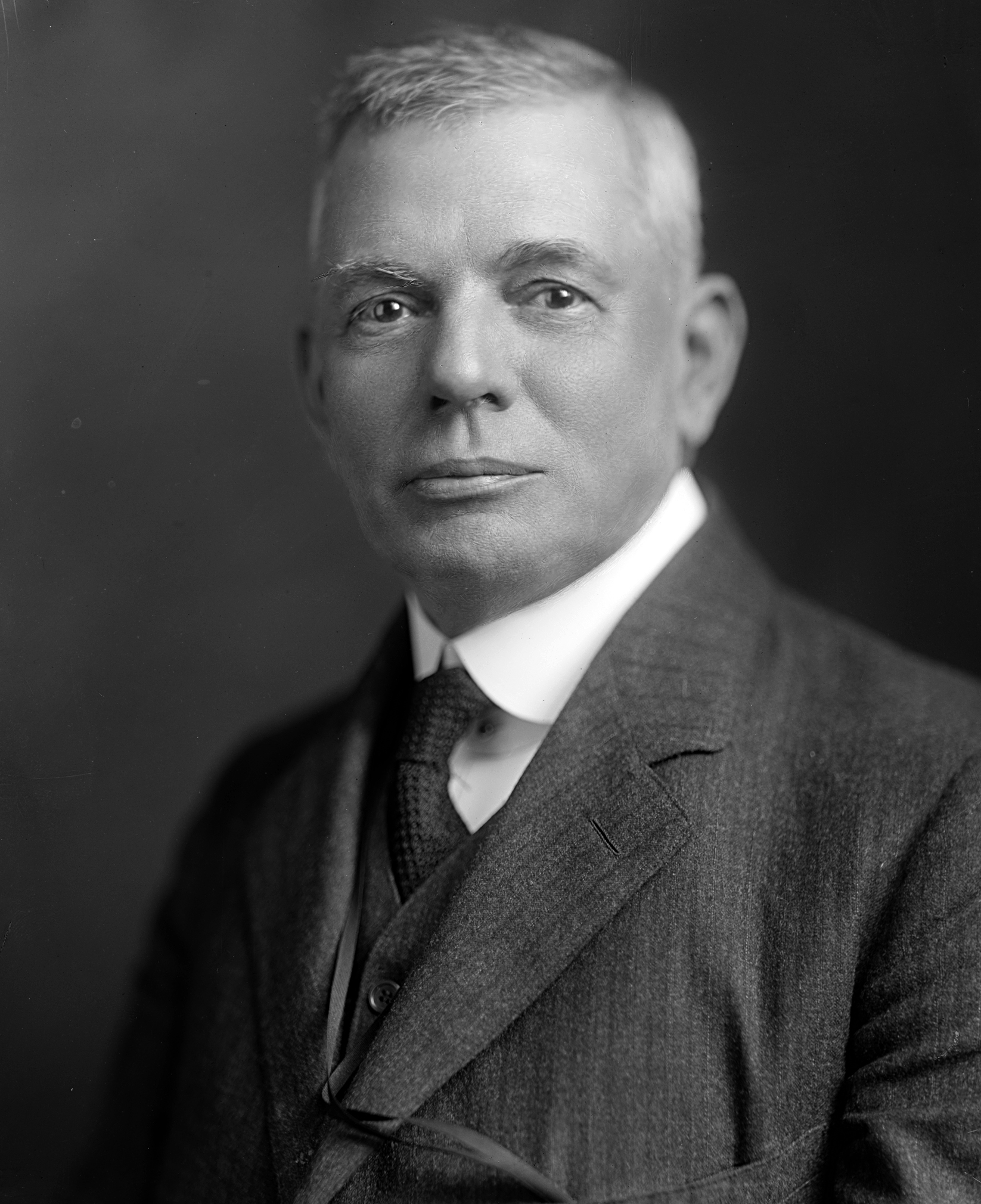

Member of the U.S. House of Representatives from Virginia's 7th district
- In office March 4, 1923 – March 3, 1929
- Preceded by: John Paul
- Succeeded by: Jacob A. Garber
- In office November 7, 1916 – December 15, 1922
- Preceded by: James Hay
- Succeeded by: John Paul

Member of the Virginia Senate from the 12th district
- In office December 8, 1887 – December 4, 1895
- Preceded by: Marshall McCormick
- Succeeded by: E. H. Jackson

Personal details
- Born: Thomas Walter Harrison; August 5, 1856 Leesburg, Virginia, U.S.
- Died: May 9, 1935 (aged 78) Winchester, Virginia, U.S.
- Party: Democratic
- Spouse(s): Julia Knight; Nellie Cover
- Children: Burr Powell Harrison and 3 daughters
- Education: University of Virginia
- Occupation: Lawyer, politician

Thomas Walter Harrison (August 5, 1856 – May 9, 1935) was a Virginia lawyer, judge and politician. He served in the Senate of Virginia and in the United States House of Representatives.

== Early and family life ==
Born in Leesburg, Loudoun County, Virginia to attorney Matthew Harrison (1822-1875) and his wife, the former Anne Harriott of Washington DC, Harrison was descended from the First Families of Virginia. His lawyer grandfather Burr William Harrison represented Loudoun County, Virginia in the Virginia House of Delegates 1840-1847. His great-grandfather Richard Henry Lee served in the Continental Congress, including as its President, and in the Virginia House of Burgesses as well as the Constitutional Convention of 1787. Thomas had an older sister Sallie and a younger sister Harriet. He attended local academies at Leesburg, Middleburg, and Hanover. His father owned relatively little property before the American Civil War, but more in 1870 despite the wartime devastation. Thomas attended the academic and law departments of the University of Virginia at Charlottesville and graduated in 1879.

Thomas Harrison married twice. He first married Julia Knight and they had daughters Katherine Young Harrison (1884-1973), Harriett Harrison (1886-1892) and Julia K. Harrison (1888-1889), then a son, Burr Powell Harrison (1904-1973) who like his father served in the Virginia Senate and U.S. Congress. He then married Nellie Cover.

== Career ==
Admitted to the bar in 1879, Harrison began a private legal practice in Winchester, Virginia. In 1883, he and fellow Democrat and lawyer Richard Evelyn Byrd Sr. bought the Winchester Times from Robert W. Hunter, and by 1899 the Times had become the weekly edition of Byrd's Winchester Evening Star. The weekly's last edition was published on March 29, 1905. Voters in 12th district (composed of Clarke, Frederick, and Warren counties) elected Harrison to the Senate of Virginia in 1887 (a seat previously held by Berryville attorney Marshall McCormick) and re-elected him once, so he served from 1887 to 1895. In 1895 changed the district boundaries substantially, and J.G. Cune was elected to the new senatorial district comprising Frederick and Shenandoah counties, and E.H. Jackson was elected in the new district encompassing Clarke, Page and Warren counties.

Meanwhile, Harrison had not been a candidate for re-election, because the Virginia General Assembly elected him as circuit judge for what was then Virginia's 17th judicial district, and he remained in that office from 1895 until September 1, 1916, when he ran for a seat in the U.S. Congress following the resignation of James Hay. Harrison also won election to the State constitutional convention in 1901 and 1902, representing Winchester and Frederick County.

Voters from Virginia's 7th congressional district elected Harrison as a Democrat to the Sixty-fourth Congress; he would serve from November 7, 1916, to December 15, 1922. During the first four elections, Harrison's opponent was Republican John Paul Jr. Harrison won the first contests, winning re-election to the Sixty-fifth and Sixty-sixth Congresses. However, in the Sixty-seventh Congress, he only served from March 4, 1921, until December 15, 1922, when the seat was awarded to Republican Paul, who had contested that election.

Harrison defeated Paul to win the seat in the Sixty-eighth, then Paul became U.S. Attorney for the Western District of Virginia, so Harrison defeated other Republicans to win re-election to Sixty-ninth, and Seventieth Congresses (March 4, 1923 – March 3, 1929).

He authored Harrison on Wills and Administration for the Michie Co. in 1927.

Harrison lost his re-election bid in 1928 to the Seventy-first Congress to Republican businessman Jacob A. Garber.

== Death and legacy ==
Harrison continued his legal practice in Winchester, Virginia, until his death there on May 9, 1935. He was interred in Winchester's Mount Hebron Cemetery.

== Electoral history ==
- 1916; Harrison was elected to the U.S. House of Representatives in a special election with 61.29% of the vote, defeating Republican John Paul and Independent E.C. Garrison. He was simultaneously elected in the general election unopposed.
- 1918; Harrison was re-elected with 88.99% of the vote, defeating Republican Paul.
- 1920; Harrison was re-elected over Republican Paul, however, Paul contested the results of the election and was seated.
- 1922; Harrison was re-elected with 62.29% of the vote, defeating Republican Paul.
- 1924; Harrison was re-elected with 59.15% of the vote, defeating Republican J.H. Ruebush and fellow Democrat Dabney C. Harrison.
- 1926'; Harrison was re-elected with 64.92% of the vote, defeating Republican Walter R. Talbot and now-Independent Dabney C. Harrison.
- 1928; Harrison lost his re-election bid to Jacob A. Garber.

== Works ==
- Harrison, Thomas W. (1927). Harrison on Wills and Administration for Virginia and West Virginia (Three Vols.). Charlottesville: The Michie Company.

U.S. House of Representatives
Preceded by James Hay	Member of the U.S. House of Representatives from Virginia's 7th congressional district 1916–1922	Succeeded by John Paul
Preceded by John Paul	Member of the U.S. House of Representatives from Virginia's 7th congressional district 1923–1929	Succeeded by Jacob A. Garber
