= John W. Fishburne =

American politician

Member of the U.S. House of Representatives from Virginia's 7th district
- In office March 4, 1931 – March 3, 1933
- Preceded by: Jacob A. Garber
- Succeeded by: A. Willis Robertson

Member of the Virginia House of Delegates for Albemarle and Charlottesville
- In office December 4, 1895 – December 1, 1897 Serving with William H. Boaz
- Preceded by: John S. Harris
- Succeeded by: William R. Duke

Personal details
- Born: March 8, 1868 Charlottesville, Virginia
- Died: June 24, 1937 (aged 69) Ivy Depot, Virginia
- Party: Democratic
- Education: Washington and Lee University; University of Virginia

John Wood Fishburne (March 8, 1868 – June 24, 1937) was a Virginia Congressman and cousin to Congressmen Fontaine Maury Maverick and James Luther Slayden of Texas. The three men are related to the oceanographer, Matthew Fontaine Maury of Virginia.

== Biography ==
Fishburne was born near Albemarle County, Charlottesville, Virginia on March 8, 1868. He attended Pantops Academy, near Charlottesville, Va., and Washington and Lee University in Lexington, Virginia.

He taught at the Fishburne Military School in Waynesboro, Virginia, in 1886 and 1887. Fishburne graduated from the law department of the University of Virginia at Charlottesville in 1890; was admitted to the bar the same year; and commenced practice in Charlottesville.

He was also engaged in agricultural pursuits; served in the Virginia House of Delegates in 1895–1897; member of the Virginia State Library Board in 1904–1913; appointed judge of the eighth judicial circuit in 1913; subsequently elected by the legislature and served from 1913 until his resignation in 1930. Fishburne was elected as a Democrat to the 72nd United States Congress (March 4, 1931 – March 3, 1933). He was not a candidate for renomination in 1932 and resumed the practice of law.

Fishburne died in Ivy Depot, near Charlottesville, June 24, 1937. His interment was in Riverview Cemetery, Charlottesville.

== Election ==
In 1930 Fishburne was elected to the U.S. House of Representatives with 58.37% of the vote, defeating Republican Jacob A. Garber.

U.S. House of Representatives
Preceded by Jacob A. Garber	Member of the U.S. House of Representatives from Virginia's 7th congressional district 1931–1933	Succeeded by District eliminated A. Willis Robertson after district re-established in 1935
