= Aubrey G. Weaver =

American politician

Member of the Virginia Senate from the 24th district
- In office January 12, 1932 – March 11, 1944
- Preceded by: Ward Swank
- Succeeded by: Jacob A. Garber

Member of the Virginia House of Delegates for Clarke and Winchester
- In office January 10, 1912 – January 11, 1916
- Preceded by: J. R. Grigsby
- Succeeded by: Kenneth N. Gilpin

Personal details
- Born: Aubrey Gardner Weaver; October 12, 1882 Front Royal, Virginia, U.S.
- Died: March 11, 1944 (aged 61) Richmond, Virginia, U.S.
- Resting place: Prospect Hill Cemetery, Front Royal, Virginia
- Party: Democratic
- Spouse: Pearl Davis Kenner
- Children: 2
- Education: Randolph Macon Academy (BA); University of Virginia School of Law (LLB)
- Occupation: Lawyer; politician

Aubrey Gardner Weaver (October 12, 1882 – March 11, 1944, nicknamed "Kingfish") was a Virginia lawyer and politician who served in both houses of the Virginia General Assembly.

== Early and family life ==
The third generation of his family to live in Front Royal (his grandfather having moved from Culpeper and earlier German ancestors having anglicized their probable "Weber" surname), he was the middle of three sons born to the former Emma Hanson (1851–1920) and her husband William Cass Weaver Sr. (1849–1934). His eldest brother, William C. Weaver Jr. (1879–1941) became a merchant (including part-owner of a bicycle business), and their sister Mattie Grey Weaver (1888–1904) died as a teenager. The youngest brother, Henry Byrne Weaver (1883–1956) proved the longest-lived. After a primary education nearby, Weaver enrolled at Randolph Macon Academy and then completed his legal studies at the University of Virginia Law School.

He married Pearl Davis Kenner and they had two daughters who survived their parents Evelyn Hanson Weaver Carson (1906–1999) married Irish immigrant Joseph Malcolm Carson (1901–1991) who rose to become a Rear Admiral in the U.S. Navy during World War II and the Korean conflict. Her sister Winnie Davis Weaver Nicholls (1914–1977) remained in Front Royal after her marriage.

== Career ==
After admission to the Virginia bar, Weaver became a distinguished criminal defense lawyer, practicing in Front Royal (the Warren County seat), as well as in adjoining counties. He later became president of the State Board of Law Examiners. He was also active in the Masons, Shriners, and Odd Fellows, and became an honorary member of the Veterans of Foreign Wars. Weaver also bought and sold at least two houses in Front Royal, in 1911 from J.E. Petersen that he resold later that year to Samuel G. Darr, and in 1923 buying another from veteran turned educator Floyd Jackson Board (who sat on Front Royal's city council for 16 years and was the town's treasurer for 14 years), which Weaver sold four years later.

A Democrat and member of the Byrd Organization, Weaver first won election to the Virginia House of Delegates in 1911, representing Warren and adjoining Clarke counties part-time beginning in the session that began the following January. He won re-election, but after the 1915 election was succeeded by Kenneth Newcomer Gilpin of Clarke County. Weaver was a presidential elector in 1916 (for Virginia-born Woodrow Wilson), and also attended the Democratic National Conventions in 1928 and 1932.

As the Great Depression began, fellow lawyer, Democrat and state senate veteran Ward Swank decided to run to become Harrisonburg's mayor, and Weaver won election as his replacement, representing a district from the Piedmont foothills of the Blue Ridge Mountains to the middle of the Shenandoah Valley, including Page, Rappahannock, Rockingham, and Warren Counties as well as Harrisonburg. Weaver rose to became Chairman of the Governor's Budget Advisory Committee and Chairman of the Steering Committee. He also worked with William E. Carson (chairman of the Virginia Conservation and Development Commission, a precursor of the Virginia Department of Conservation and Recreation) and other local and federal officials to establish Skyline Drive and Shenandoah National Park. Voters re-elected Weaver until his death.

== Death and legacy ==
Weaver died of a heart attack on March 11, 1944 at Richmond's Jefferson Hotel, one of six casualties of a fire during a party he hosted. After one of the largest funerals ever held at Front Royal's Methodist Church (with Governor Tuck, Lt. Gov. Darden and Senator Byrd as honorary pallbearers and flowers dropped from an airplane flying overhead), Weaver was buried in the family plot in Front Royal's Prospect Hill cemetery.
