= Lucian Louis Watts =

American politician and advocate for the blind

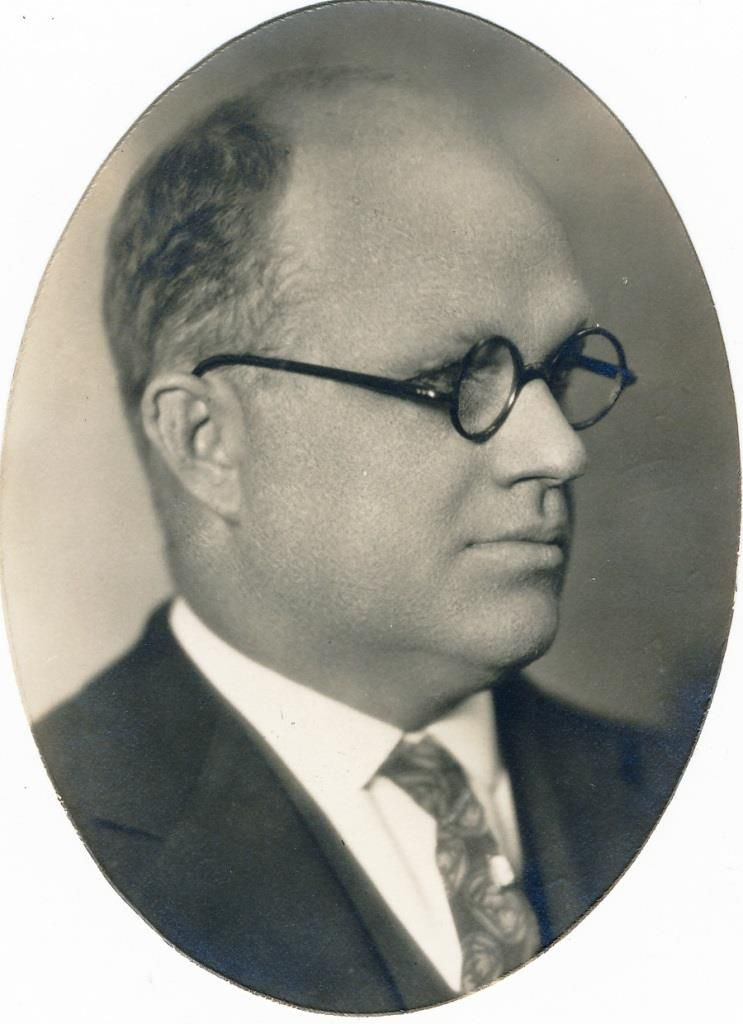
- Born: November 28, 1888; Stony Point, Virginia, US
- Died: April 30, 1974 (aged 85)
- Occupation(s): Statesman, advocate for the blind

Lucian Louis Watts (1888–1974) was a leader in efforts to improve the social welfare of blind Virginians. Born sighted and blinded in adulthood, Watts was involved in the founding of state and national organizations for the blind, including the Virginia Association of Workers for the Blind (now Virginia Industries for the Blind), the Virginia Commission for the Blind (now the Virginia Department for the Blind and Vision Impaired), and the American Foundation for the Blind. Watts advocated for programs to prevent blindness, and, in a time when education for the blind in Virginia was limited to children, Watts expanded that training to adults.

== Early life and injury ==
Lucian Louis Watts was born on November 28, 1888, to Lucian Clark Watts and Jenny Barksdale (Burnley) Watts on the Riverhill estate in Stony Point in Albemarle County, Virginia. Watts' father was the first elected sheriff of Albemarle County, serving from 1895 to 1911. He received his first employment while still a young man as a deputy sheriff working with his father. His early years were spent at home on the family farm with his four sisters and one brother, with whom he was initially educated by a governess. He then attended local high school, where he was active in sports and became captain of the baseball team. After spending one year at Fork Union Military Academy, he started working as a contractor in railroad construction at the age of 18, rising to be superintendent before he was 21. On May 27, 1913, while working in Dickenson County, Watts lost his sight in a dynamite explosion. He was transported from the rural construction site to the hospital at the University of Virginia, where he spent months recovering before returning to his parents' home.

In 1913 there were very few state services to help blind people. The only state institutions at the time were the Virginia School for the Deaf and Blind (VSDB) at Staunton, which admitted white school-aged children, and the Virginia State School for Colored Deaf and Blind Children at Newport News. Despite the fact that Watts was well over the age limit for admission to VSDB, he managed to secure a place at the school. During his time in Staunton, Watts became convinced that Virginia needed to do more to provide for the blind. He felt strongly that hardship for the blind was due to their lack of access to education and means to participate in society, and not due to blind persons' moral failing or lack of will.

== Public service ==
After graduating from VSDB, Watts began a career in public service. His focus was on improving the situation of blind Virginians, particularly for providing a service to those who had become blind as adults and needed training to help them find new ways to adapt and earn a living. Working alongside the president of the VSDB, H. M. McManaway and others, he founded the Virginia Association of Workers for the Blind (now, Virginia Industries for the Blind) in 1919 with the express purpose of promoting the interests of those who were blind.

Through the Virginia Association of Workers for the Blind, and in collaboration with state congressman Herbert J. Taylor, who sponsored the bill, Watts lobbied the Virginia legislature to form a temporary commission to determine the number of blind people in Virginia and assess their needs. Watts and Taylor were both appointed to the Legislative Commission for the Blind, which presented its census and report in 1921. The Commission became permanent in 1922, and Watts served as its executive secretary for the next 34 years until his retirement at the age of 68. The Virginia Commission for the Blind building, designed by the prominent Virginia architect J. Binford Walford, was dedicated in 1941. The Commission was renamed several times and is now called the Virginia Department for the Blind and Visually Impaired.

In addition to his work with the Virginia Association of Workers for the Blind and the Virginia Commission for the Blind, in 1926, Watts successfully campaigned to represent Albemarle County in the Virginia House of Delegates. He held office for 4 terms, from 1926 to 1933, using his position in the legislature to better advance his causes for the blind. In 1930, Watts helped to pass a bill that ensured that, if there were six or more students with impaired vision in any county in the state, sight-saving classes were established.

Watts' endeavors were not limited to Virginia. From 1934 to 1937 he served as president of the American Foundation for the Blind whose mission included gathering information about vision loss and advocating for the needs of blind people to the federal government.

== Personal life ==
In 1929, Watts married Hazel Birkenmeyer, the first teacher of sight-saving classes for the Virginia Commission for the Blind. Their daughter, Hazel Elizabeth Watts, was born in 1930.

== Awards ==
Watts' many contributions and years of dedicated service were recognized and celebrated. In 1953, he received the Ambrose M. Shotwell Award from the Association of Workers for the Blind in recognition of his contributions to the rehabilitation of blind and visually impaired adults. This was followed, in 1957, by the R.B. Irwin Award, which was given by the National Industries for the Blind for his work championing the employment of people who are blind. In 1962, he was presented with the Migel Medal Award from the American Foundation for the Blind, an award honoring those whose achievements and dedication provide significant improvement to the lives of people with vision loss.

== Death ==
Lucian Louis Watts died at his home on April 30, 1974, and was buried at Riverview Cemetery, Charlottesville, Virginia.
