= Jacob A. Garber =

American politician

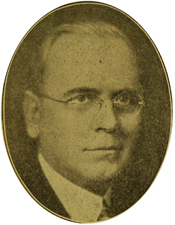

Member of the Virginia Senate from the 24th district
- In office 1944–1947
- Preceded by: Aubrey G. Weaver
- Succeeded by: Raymond R. Guest

Member of the U.S. House of Representatives from Virginia's 7th district
- In office March 4, 1929 – March 3, 1931
- Preceded by: Thomas W. Harrison
- Succeeded by: John W. Fishburne

Member of the Virginia House of Delegates for Rockingham and Harrisonburg
- In office January 14, 1920 – January 10, 1922 Serving with William Ruebush
- Preceded by: Charles H. Rolston
- Succeeded by: George B. Keezell

Personal details
- Born: Jacob Aaron Garber; January 25, 1879 Harrisonburg, Virginia, U.S.
- Died: December 2, 1953 (aged 74) Harrisonburg, Virginia, U.S.
- Party: Republican
- Education: Emerson College

Jacob Aaron Garber (January 25, 1879 – December 2, 1953) was a teacher and businessman who served in both houses of the Virginia General Assembly as well as in the United States House of Representatives as a Republican.

== Early and family life ==
Jacob A. Garber was born near Harrisonburg, Virginia. He attended the public schools of Rockingham County, and Bridgewater College. He then moved to Prince William County, Virginia, and became Principal of Brentsville Academy in 1904 and 1905. He then moved to Boston, Massachusetts, and graduated from Emerson College in, in 1907

== Career ==
Garber taught in Well's Memorial Institute in Boston in 1906 and 1907, then became the Secretary of Emerson College in 1907 and 1908. He returned to Timberville, Virginia, in 1908 and was employed as a bank cashier until 1924.

Rockingham County voters elected Garber and William Ruebush as their (part-time) representatives in the Virginia House of Delegates in 1920, the pair defeating two other men that year, but losing their re-election bid to others in 1922. In 1924, Garber was elected treasurer of Rockingham County, and served from 1924 to 1929. He was member of and was interested in various orchard and canning organizations.

In 1928, voters elected Garber as a Republican to the Seventy-first Congress. He defeated veteran Democrat Thomas W. Harrison, but lost his re-election bid in 1930 to John W. Fishburne.

After Congress, Garber served as chief of the field and processing-tax divisions at the Internal Revenue Office in Richmond, Virginia from 1931 to 1935. He was a delegate to the Republican National Convention in 1932, but lost another attempt to return to Congress in 1940.

When Aubrey G. Weaver died, Garber won a special election and served in the Virginia State Senate from 1945 to 1947. He later resumed operation of commercial orchards, and died in Harrisonburg, Virginia on December 2, 1953. He was interred in Church of the Brethren Cemetery in Timberville, Virginia.

== Elections ==
- 1928; Garber was elected to the U.S. House of Representatives with 50.37% of the vote, defeating Democrat Thomas W. Harrison and Independents Dabney C. Harrison and H.B. McCormac.
- 1930; Garber lost his re-election bid.

== Sources ==
U.S. House of Representatives
Preceded by Thomas W. Harrison	Member of the U.S. House of Representatives from Virginia's 7th congressional district 1929–1931	Succeeded by John W. Fishburne
