= Burwell-Morgan Mill =

- U.S. National Register of Historic Places
- U.S. Historic district – Contributing property
- Virginia Landmarks Register
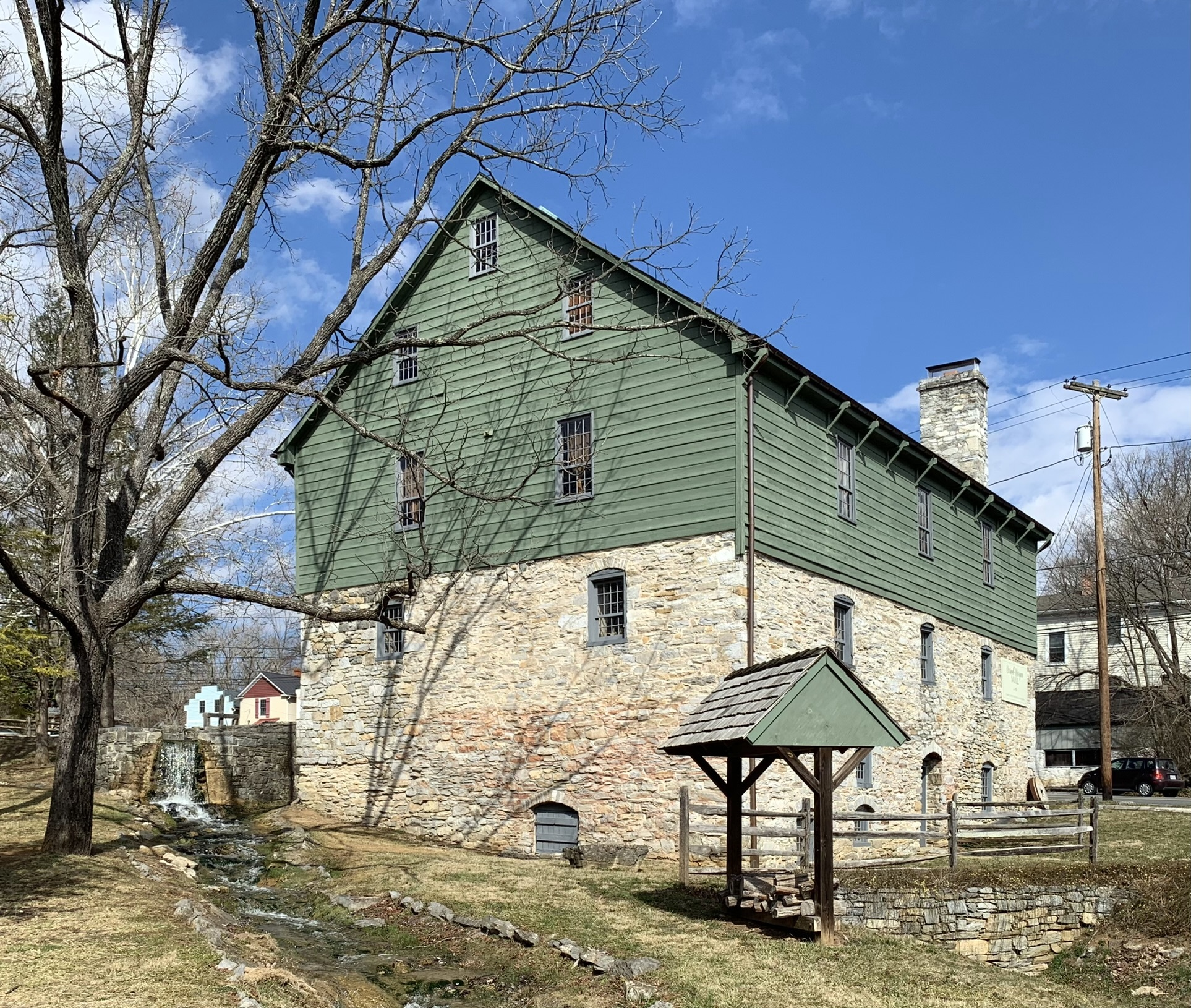
- Burwell-Morgan Mill, March 2022

- Location within Northern Virginia Location within Virginia Location within the United States
- Location: At jct. of Rtes. 723 and 255, Millwood, Virginia
- Coordinates: 39°04′08″N 78°02′17″W
- Area: 1 acre (0.40 ha)
- Built: c. 1785
- NRHP reference No.: 69000233
- VLR No.: 021-0023

Significant dates
- Added to NRHP: November 12, 1969
- Designated VLR: September 9, 1969

Burwell-Morgan Mill, also known as the Millwood Mill, is a historic grist mill located at Millwood, Clarke County, Virginia, USA. It was built about 1785 by Gen. Daniel Morgan and Lt. Col. Nathaniel Burwell, who both served in the American Revolution. Burwell was the project's financier and Morgan managed the construction. The project overseer was L.H. Mongrul, whose initials and the date 1782 are carved in a stone in the mill's wall. The mill operated until the 1950s. In 1964 it was donated to the Clarke County Historical Association, which finished restoration in 1970 and operates the mill as a museum.

The mill is a two-story structure with gable roof measuring approximately 45 feet by 60 feet. It consists of a down slope basement and first level of stone topped by a frame second story and attic addition, added around 1876. It features a rebuilt water wheel of Peruvian mahogany.

It was listed on the National Register of Historic Places in 1969. It is located in the Millwood Commercial Historic District. The nearby miller's house was restored in 1975.
