= John C. Utz =

American politician

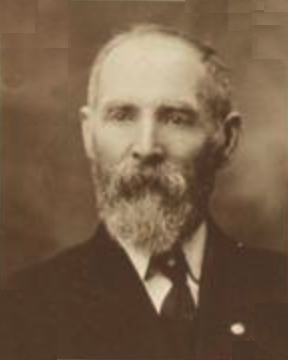

Member of the Virginia House of Delegates for Madison and Greene
- In office January 12, 1910 – January 14, 1914
- Preceded by: James E. Thrift
- Succeeded by: W. W. Field
- In office December 2, 1891 – December 4, 1895
- Preceded by: James Hay
- Succeeded by: George W. Graves

Personal details
- Born: John Cornelius Utz; June 21, 1844
- Died: July 24, 1919 (aged 75)
- Party: Democratic
- Spouse: Virginia Elizabeth Fray

Military service
- Allegiance: Confederate States
- Branch/service: Confederate States Army
- Unit: 43rd Battalion, Va. Cavalry
- Battles/wars: American Civil War

John Cornelius Utz (June 21, 1844 – July 24, 1919) was an American politician who served in the Virginia House of Delegates.
