= Ward Swank =

American lawyer and politician

Mayor of Harrisonburg
- In office September 1, 1938 – September 1, 1944
- Preceded by: James O. Stickley
- Succeeded by: Bernard Denton
- In office September 1, 1932 – September 1, 1936
- Preceded by: John W. Morrison
- Succeeded by: John W. Morrison

Member of the Virginia Senate
- In office February 28, 1923 – January 12, 1932
- Preceded by: John Paul Jr.
- Succeeded by: Aubrey G. Weaver
- Constituency: 8th district (1923‍–‍1924); 24th district (1924‍–‍1932)

Personal details
- Born: Ward Clinton Swank; November 10, 1885 Edom, Virginia, U.S.
- Died: June 2, 1949 (aged 63) Virginia, U.S.
- Resting place: Woodbine Cemetery, Harrisonburg, Virginia
- Party: Democratic
- Spouse: Elsie Miller (m. 1918)
- Children: 2
- Education: University of Virginia (BA, LLB)
- Occupation: Lawyer; soldier; politician

Ward Clinton Swank (November 10, 1885 – June 2, 1949) was a Virginia lawyer and politician who served for a decade in the Virginia Senate, then for nearly a decade as mayor of Harrisonburg, Virginia during the Great Depression.

== Early and family life ==
Born near Edom in Rockingham County, the youngest of at least ten children of the former Mary Elizabeth Horn (1847–1917) and her husband John Perry Swank (1833–1918). In the 18th century, Mennonite Swank (a/k/a Shank or Schwenk) ancestors had emigrated from Switzerland and various German states and established farms in then-developing Rockingham County, and for centuries had intermarried with other long-established Germanic families in the Shenandoah Valley including the Horns. His paternal grandfather, John Swank had married Mary Acker. Although named only in postwar rosters, his farm laborer father, who clearly married his mother in 1863, may have renounced the Mennonites' pacifist teachings and served as a private in the 7th Virginia Cavalry late in the conflict. Virginia's public schools were established after the conflict, and Ward Swank attended the Rockingham County public schools, graduating from Harrisonburg High School in 1908. He then traveled to Charlottesville to attend the University of Virginia, from which he received a bachelor's degree in 1911, and also participated in the Phi Kappa Psi fraternity and the Imp society. He graduated from the University of Virginia Law School in 1913.

Swank attended officer candidate school during World War I, then sat on the local draft board, and later became active in the American Legion. As 1918 ended, Shank married Elsie R. Miller (1894–1991) of Stephens City in Frederick County at the Shenandoah Valley's northern end, and who had graduated from the State Normal School (teacher's college) in Harrisonburg in 1917. She outlived him by decades, and bore two daughters during the marriage, Carolyn Miller (b. 1925) and Janice Newton (b. 1930).

== Career ==
Admitted to the Virginia bar in 1913, he began a private practice which later caused him to become local counsel for the Federal Land Bank of Baltimore, the B&O Railroad, the Southern Railway Co., the Norfolk and Western Railway Co., the Virginia State Highway Department, Merck & Company, Inc. and The National Bank of Harrisonburg. He was also active in the Masons, Elks, Phi Kappa Psi and Presbyterian Church (although his grandfather was an early Lutheran settler in the area).

Beginning in 1916, when Harrisonburg (the county seat for Rockingham County, which surrounds it) received its charter as an independent city in Virginia, through 1932, Swank served as clerk of the Harrisonburg City Council. He grew to know John Paul, the city attorney after 1919. A Democrat as had been his father (one of his brothers was named after Samuel J. Tilden), Swank became chairman of the Rockingham County Democratic organization, and in 1922 ran for the Virginia Senate after Paul (a Republican) resigned to run for the U.S. House of Representatives (although successful after an election contest, Paul failed to win re-election, and in 1929 would become U.S. Attorney for the Western District of Virginia, then in the waning days of the Republican Hoover administration through Massive Resistance, the judge for that district).

Although Swank's senatorial district grew geographically following reapportionment after the 1920 census which added Clarke and Warren counties to the north, Swank won re-election and continued to win re-election until 1932, when he instead ran (successfully) for Mayor of Harrisonburg. Fellow Democrat and Warren County lawyer Aubrey G. Weaver succeeded Swank as state senator, and the city continued to support Democrats until 1944. Swank also won re-election as mayor until 1936, and again after 1938. However, John W. Morrison and Raymond Dingledine held the office for several months in 1937, then upon being re-elected in 1938 Swank appointed a special council committee which recommended appointment of a city manager. During his mayoral term, the city limits were extended and progressive government improvements made. He also cooperated with federal authorities in the administration of President Franklin Delano Roosevelt, a fellow Democrat, to arrange for public works projects to benefit the unemployed of Harrisonburg and the surrounding area.

== Death ==
Swank died in 1949.
