= Shenandoah Valley Military Academy =

Former independent boarding school in Virginia, USA

Shenandoah Valley Military Academy, also known as Shenandoah Valley Academy, was an independent boarding school for boys in Winchester, Virginia, USA. It was founded in 1764 as the Winchester Academy, and was chartered by the Burgesses of Virginia in 1785. In 1861, the Winchester Academy closed with the advent of the Civil War. The institution reopened as the Shenandoah Valley Academy in 1865.

The institution closed in 1939.

== See also ==
- Shenandoah Valley Academy Records, collection available at the Handley Regional Library, Winchester, VA
