= Chapel Rural Historic District =

Historic district in Virginia, United States

- U.S. National Register of Historic Places
- U.S. Historic district
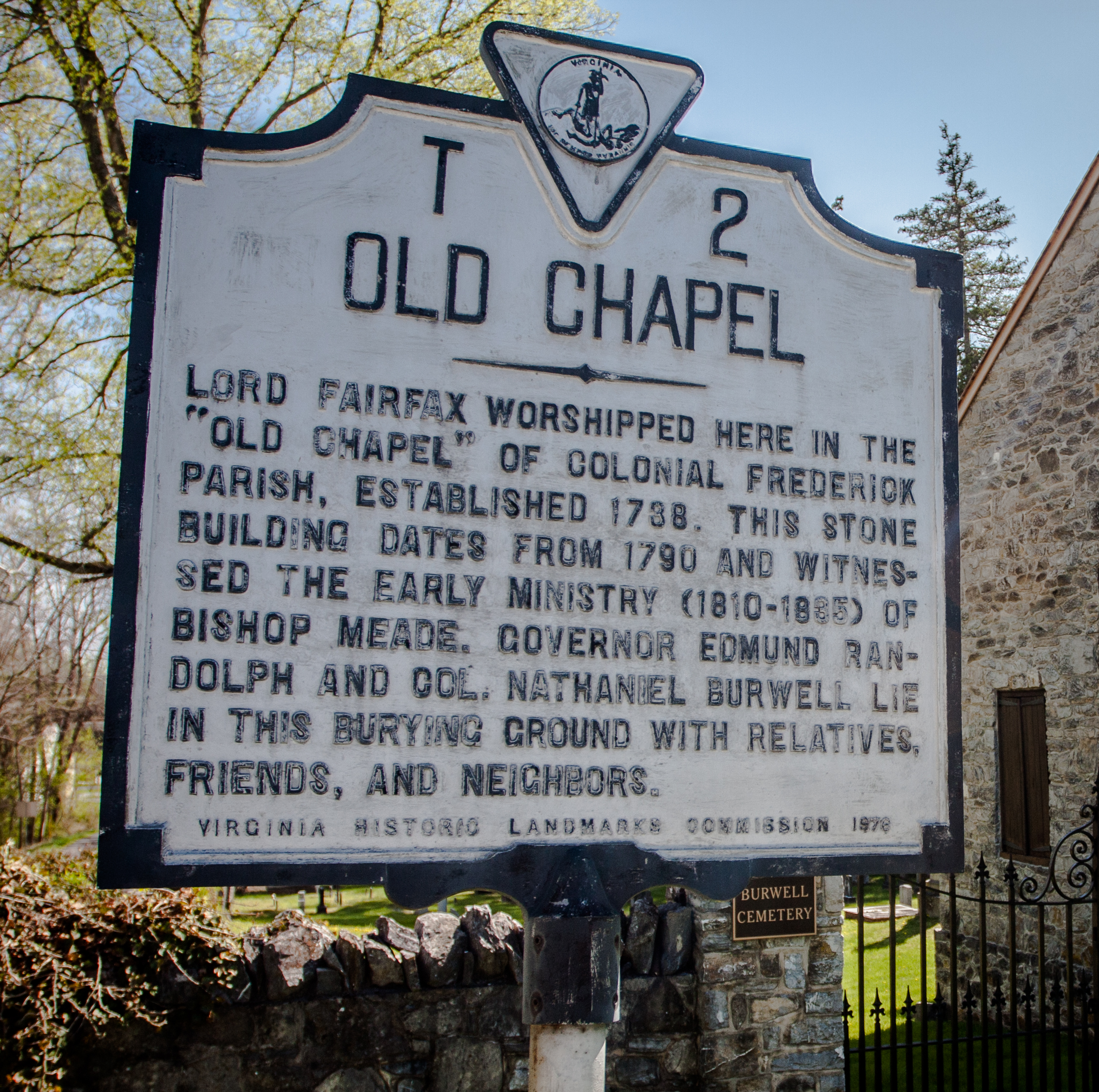
- Old Chapel Historic Marker; Intersection of Hwy. 340 and Bishop Meade Rd.

- Location within Northern Virginia Location within Virginia Location within the United States
- Location: Generally centered along Lord Fairfax Hwy, Millwood, Virginia
- Coordinates: 39°6′28″N 78°0′52″W
- Area: 11,496 acres (4,652 ha)
- NRHP reference No.: 14000010
- Added to NRHP: February 14, 2014

The Chapel Rural Historic District is an expansive rural historic district in Clarke County, Virginia. The district encompasses an area of nearly 11,500 acres (4,700 ha), a rural landscape that extends from Millwood in the south, nearly to Berryville in the north. The district takes its name from the Old Chapel, an 18th-century building that stands prominently at the junction of several roads near the center of the district. The district includes nearly 700 contributing properties.

The district was listed on the National Register of Historic Places in 2014.

== Gallery ==
A few of the historic sites within this district:

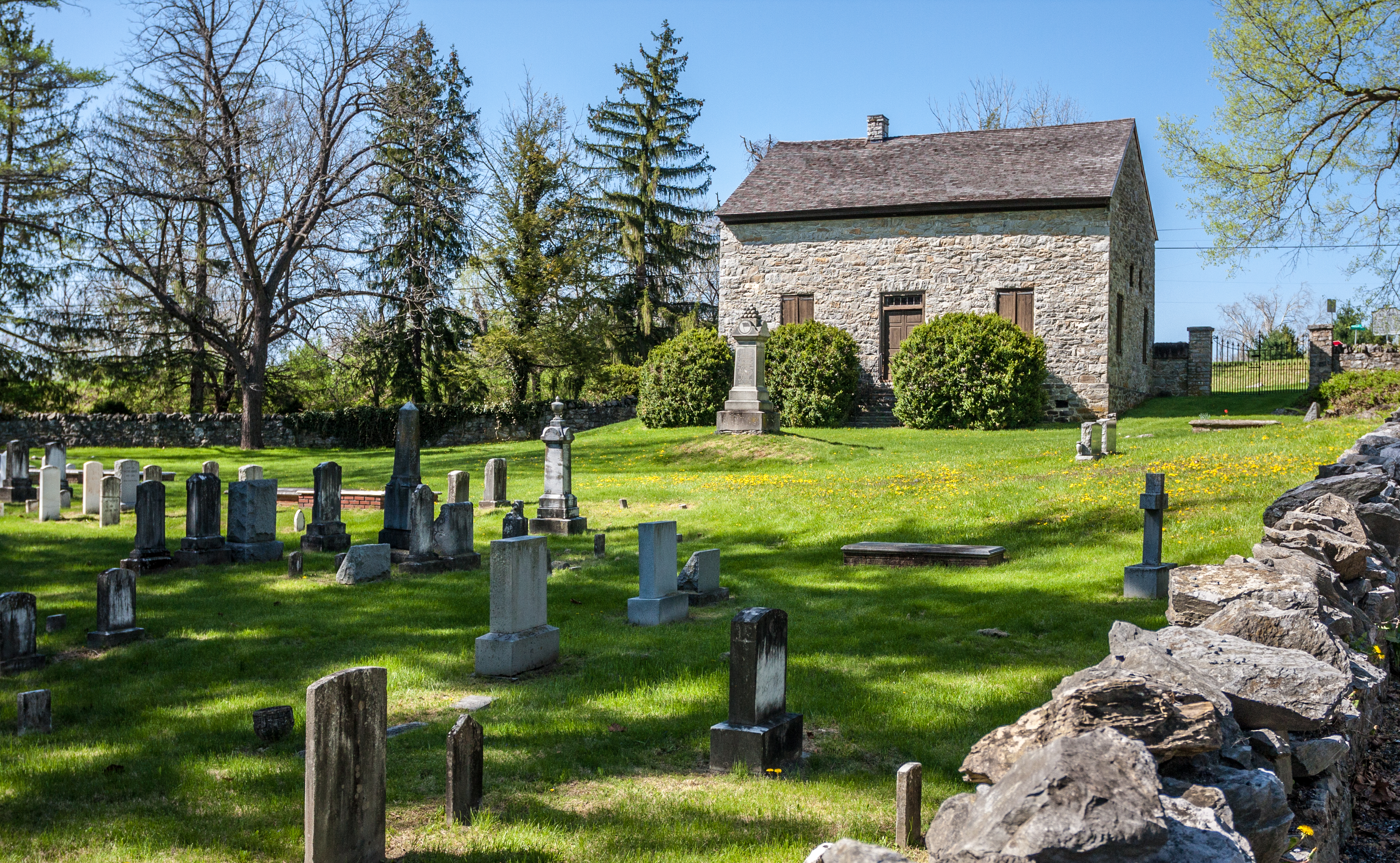
Old Chapel and Cemetery

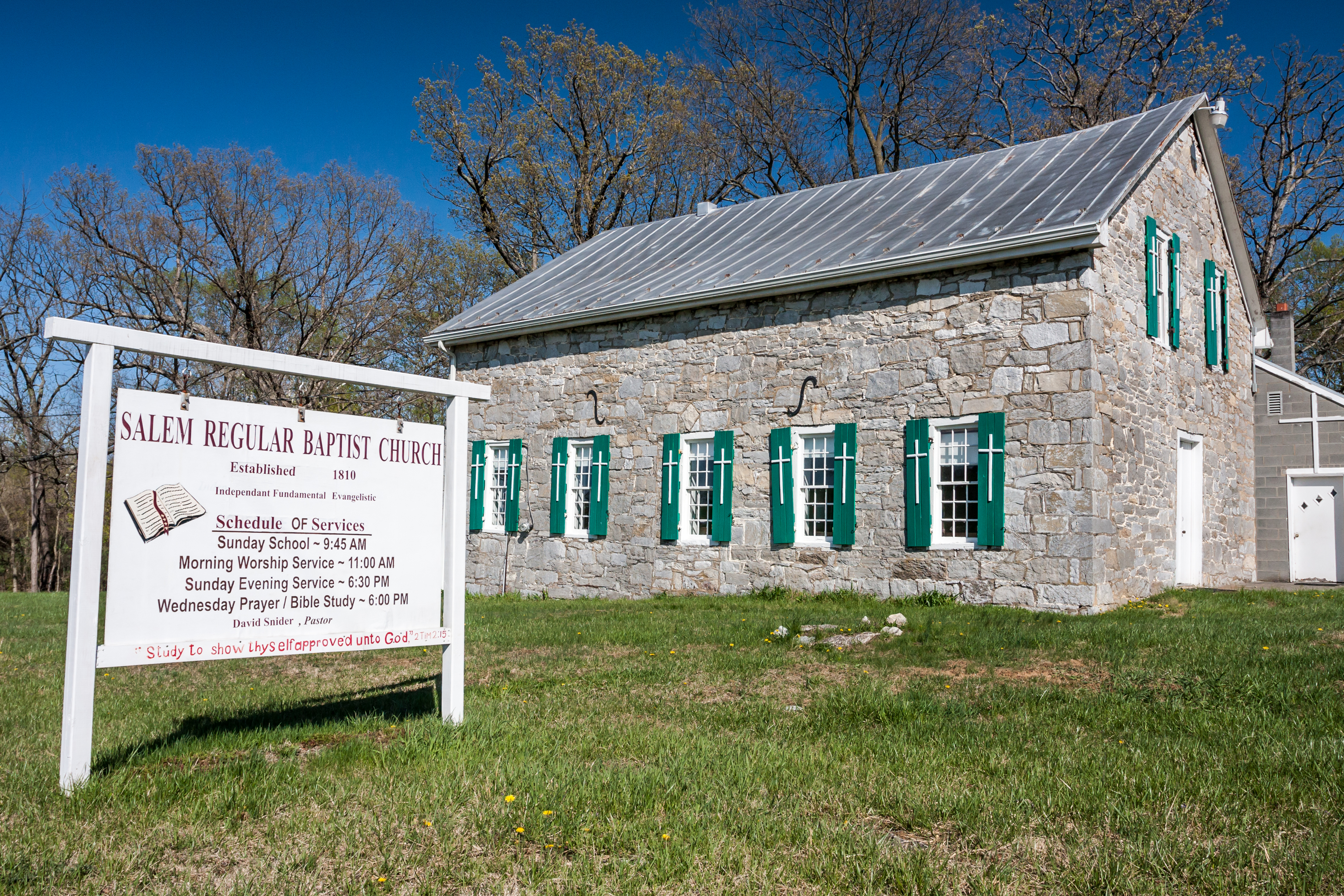
Salem Regular Baptist Church

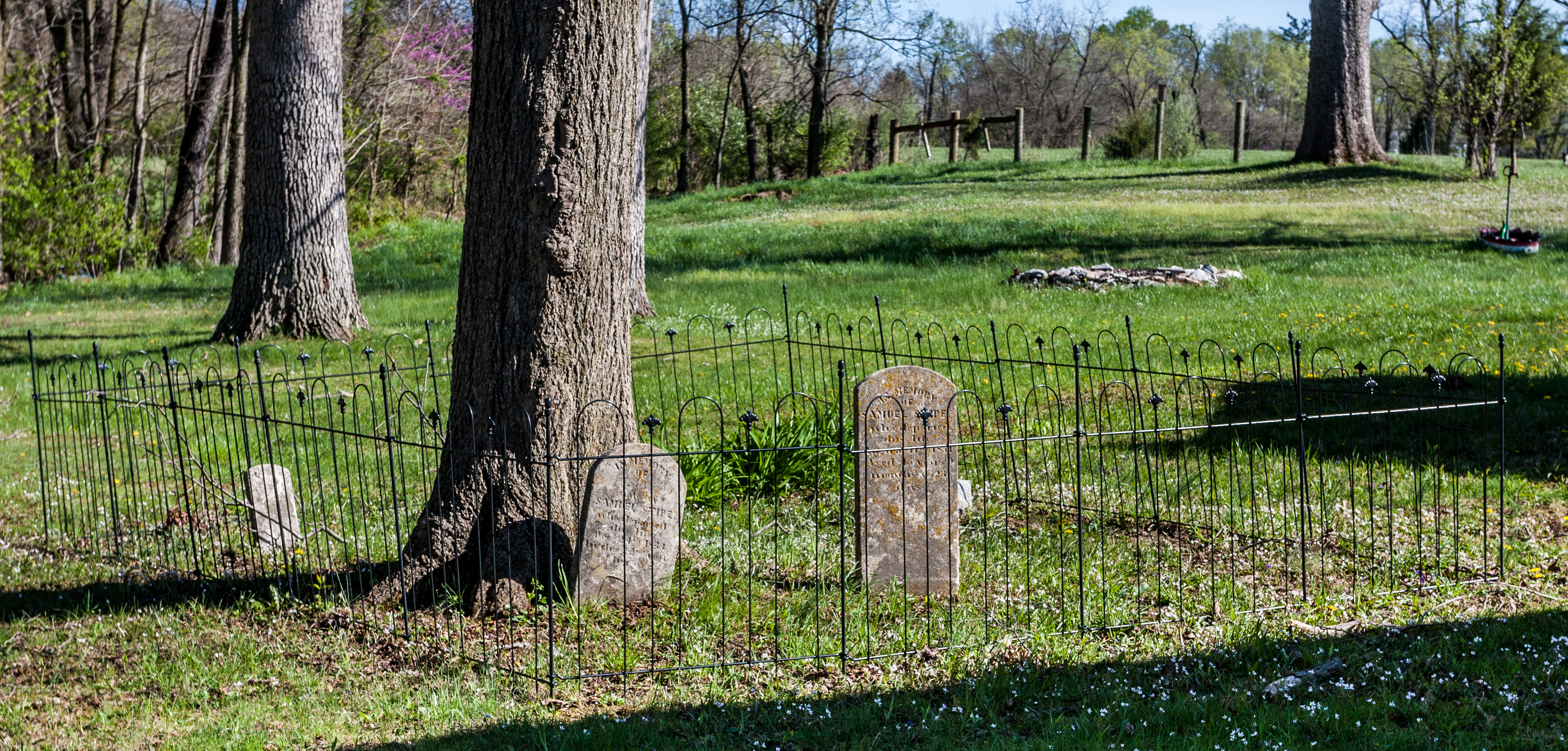
Salem Regular Baptist Church Cemetery

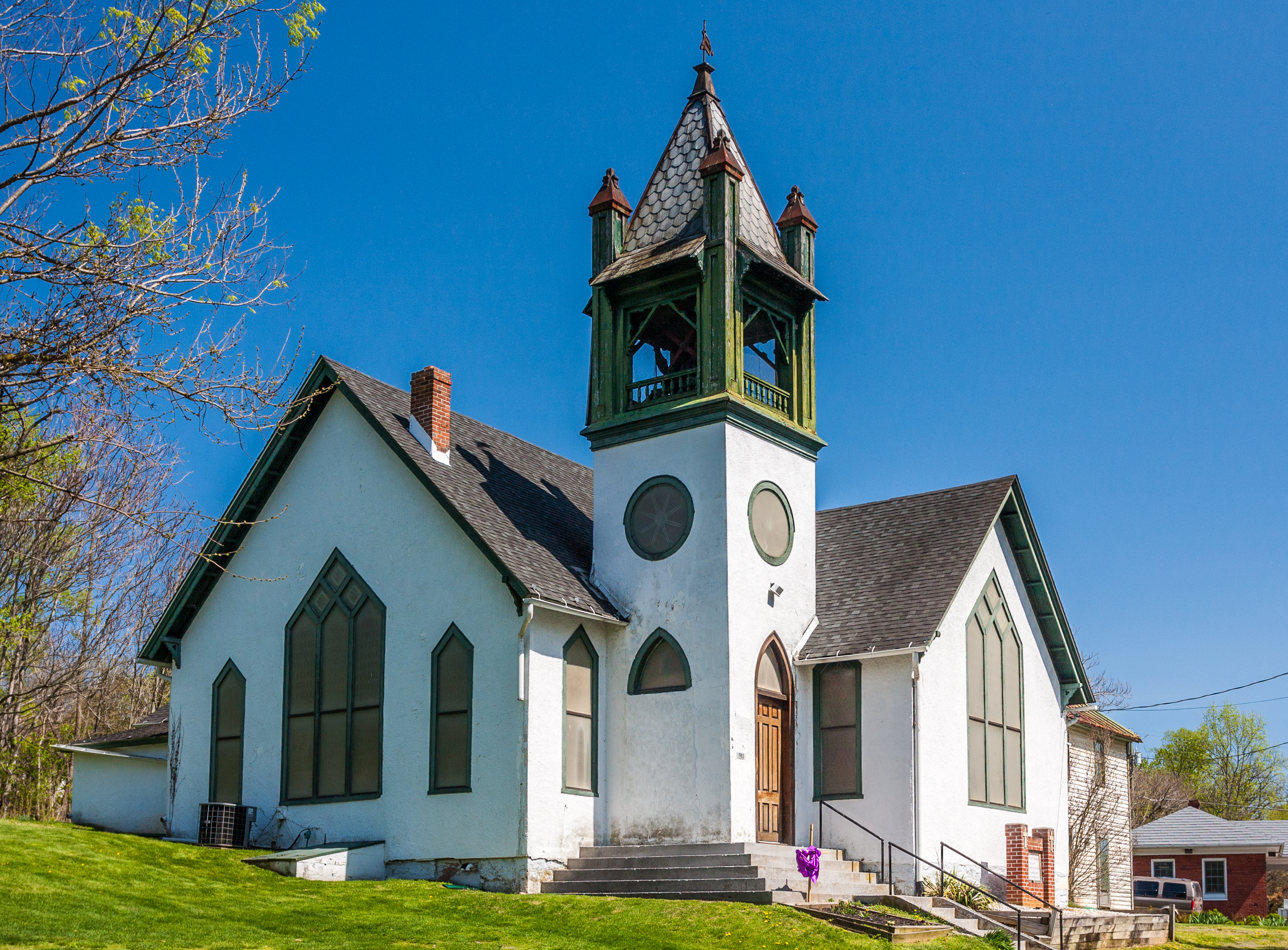
Millwood Shiloh Baptist Church

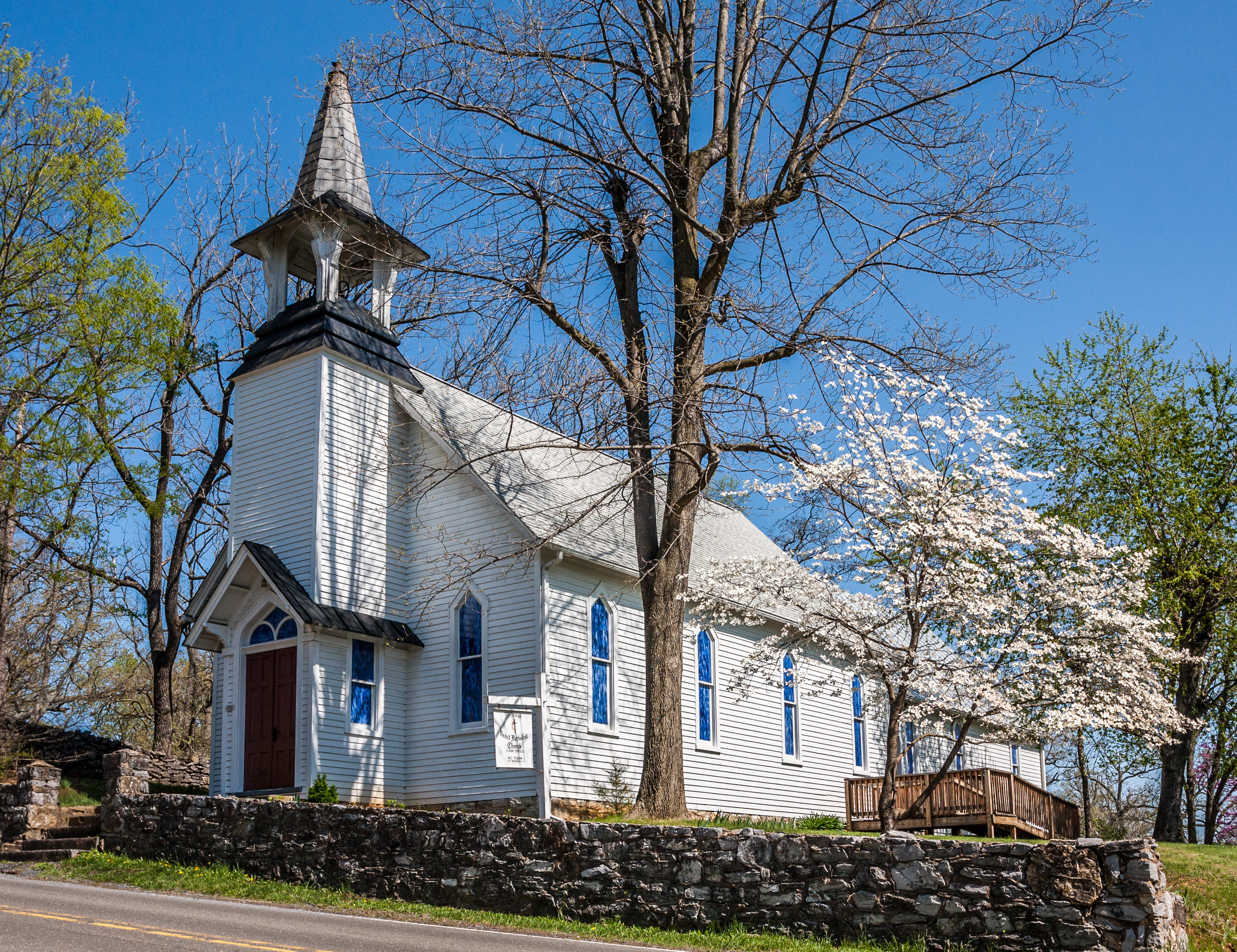
Millwood United Methodist Church

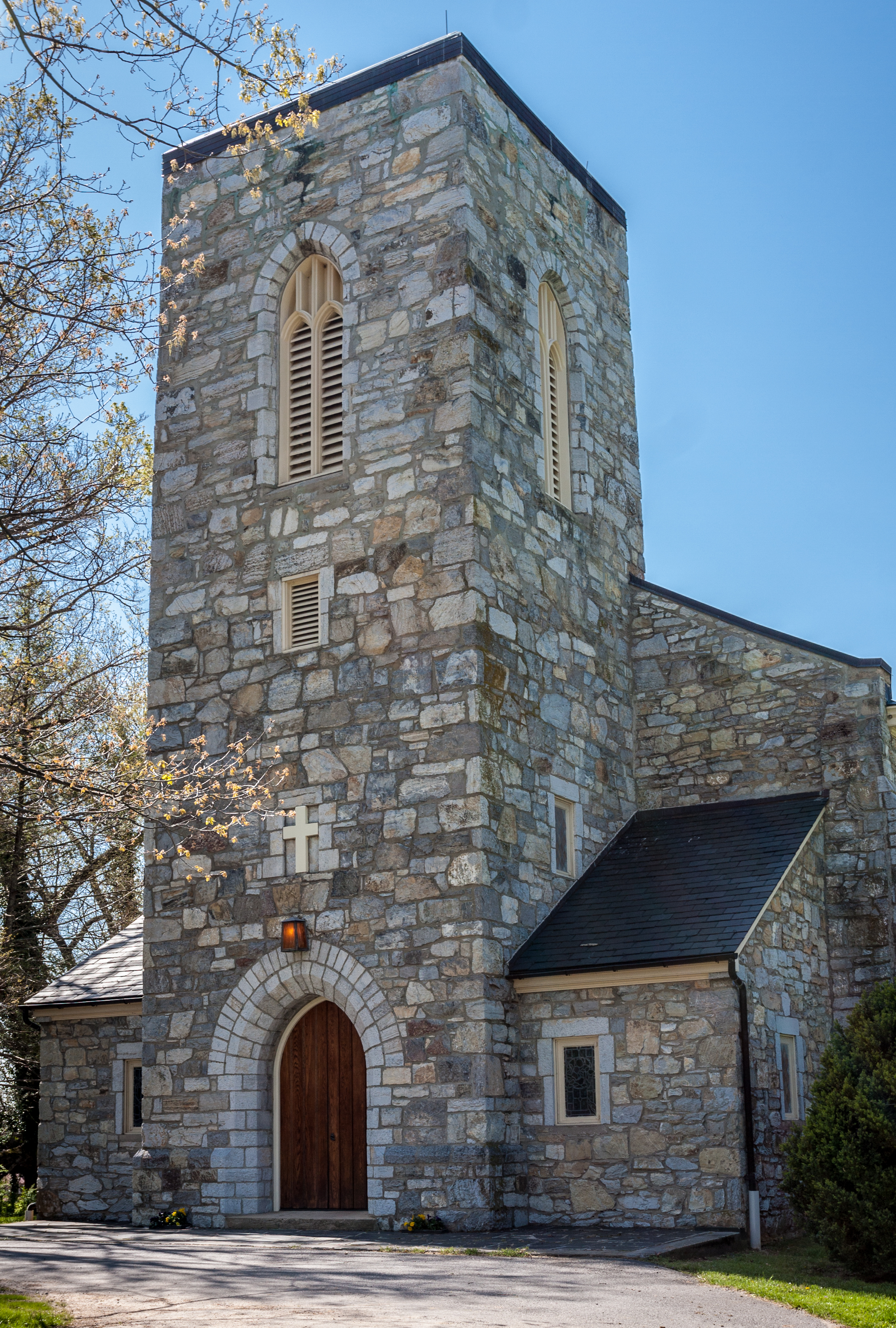
Christ Church, Millwood

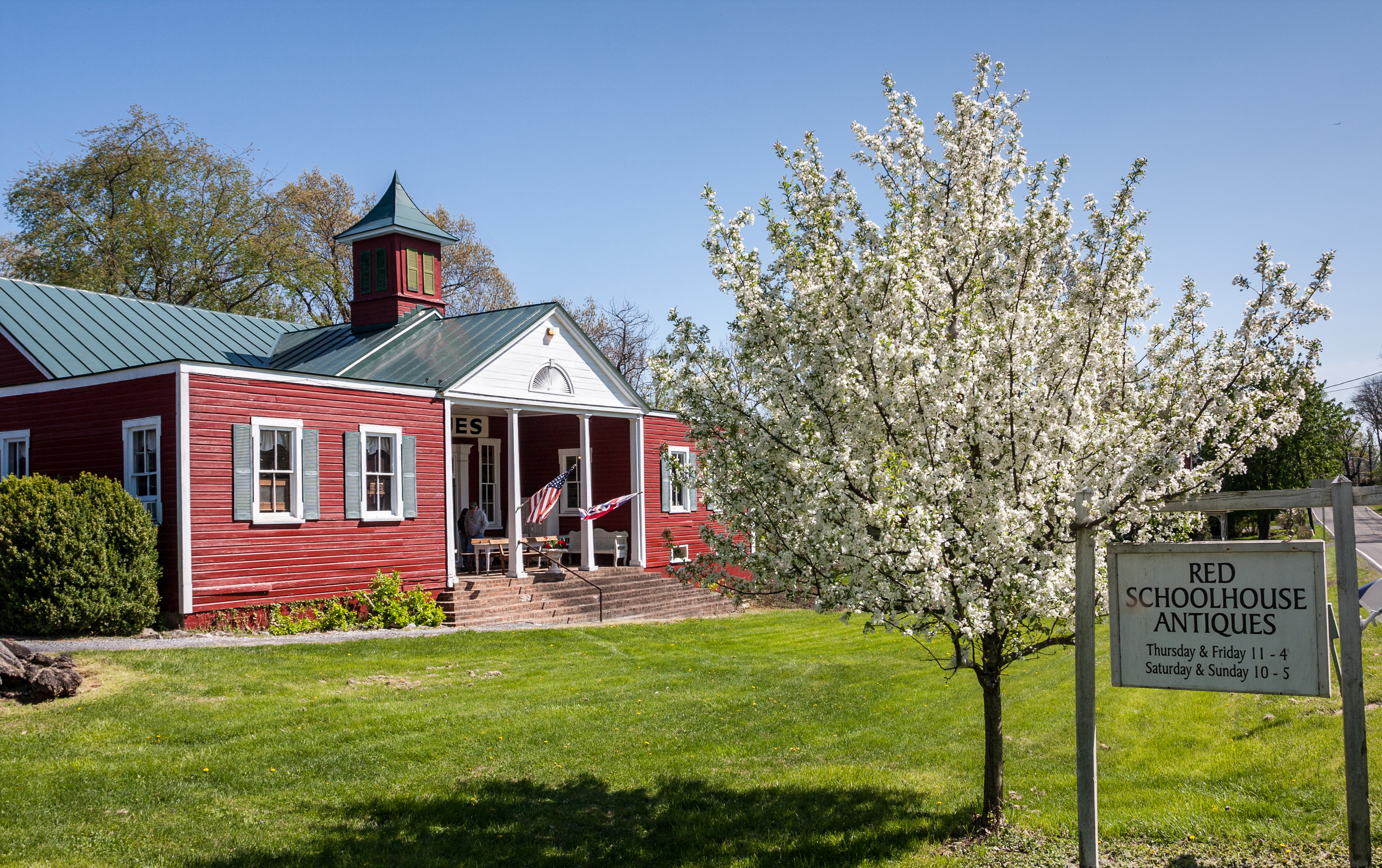
Old Schoolhouse, now Red Schoolhouse Antiques

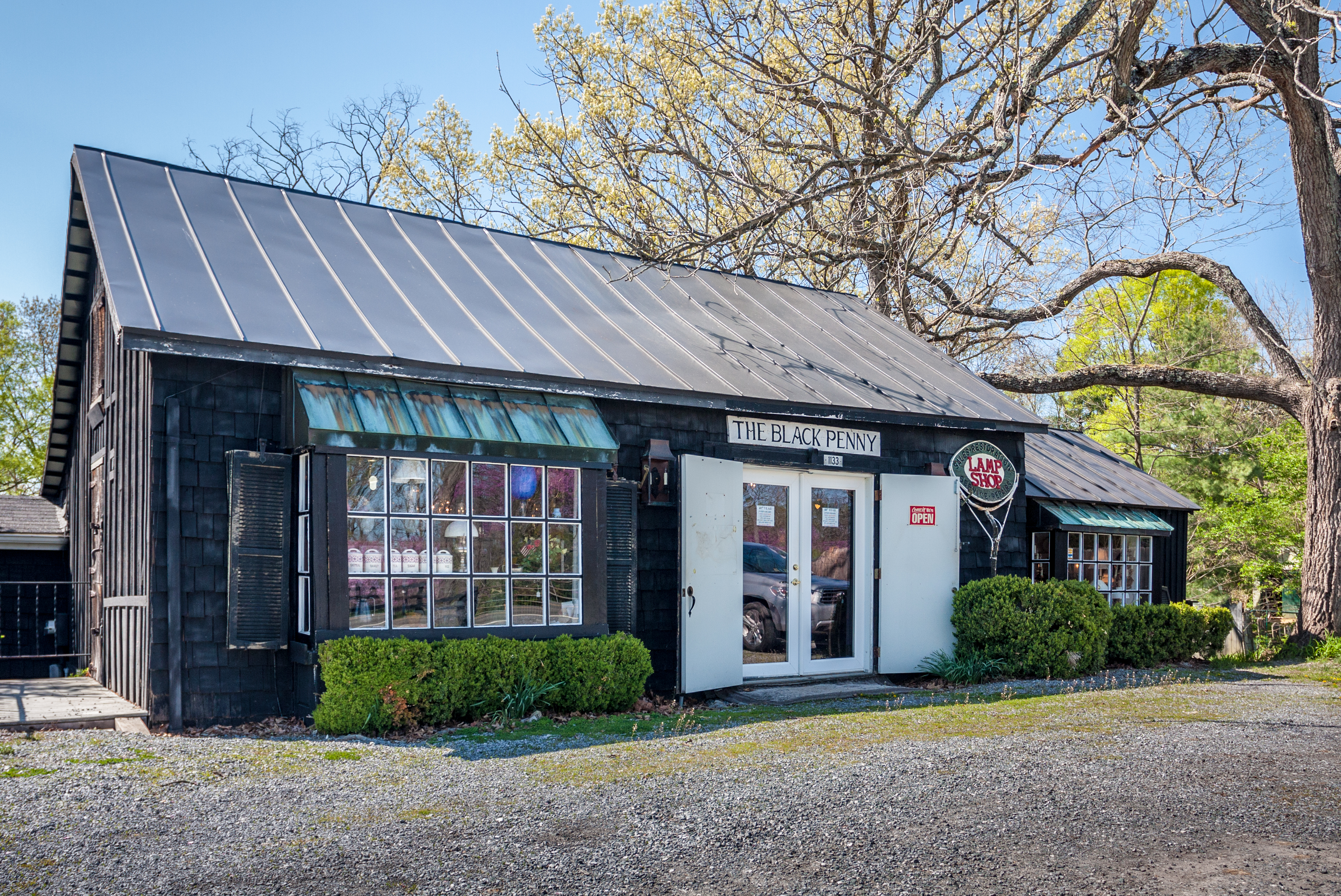
Old Barn, now Black Penny Antiques
