= Millwood, Virginia =

Unincorporated community in Virginia, United States

- Unincorporated community
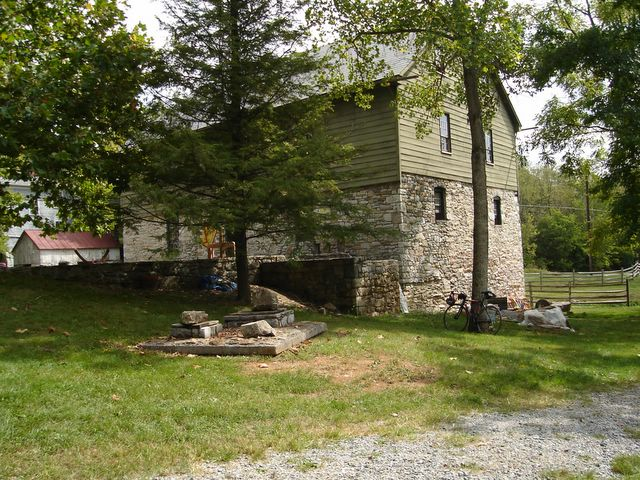
- The Burwell-Morgan Mill in September 2005

- Location within the state of Virginia Millwood (Virginia) Millwood (the United States)
- Coordinates: 39°4′10″N 78°2′16″W
- Country: United States
- State: Virginia
- County: Clarke
- Time zone: UTC−5 (Eastern (EST))
  - Summer (DST): UTC−4 (EDT)
- ZIP code: 22646

Millwood is an unincorporated community located in Clarke County, Virginia, United States. Millwood is the home of many of Clarke County's most historic sites including the Burwell-Morgan Mill (1785), Carter Hall (1792), the Greenway Historic District, Long Branch (1811), Old Chapel (1790), and the River House. Project HOPE is based at Carter Hall.

== History ==
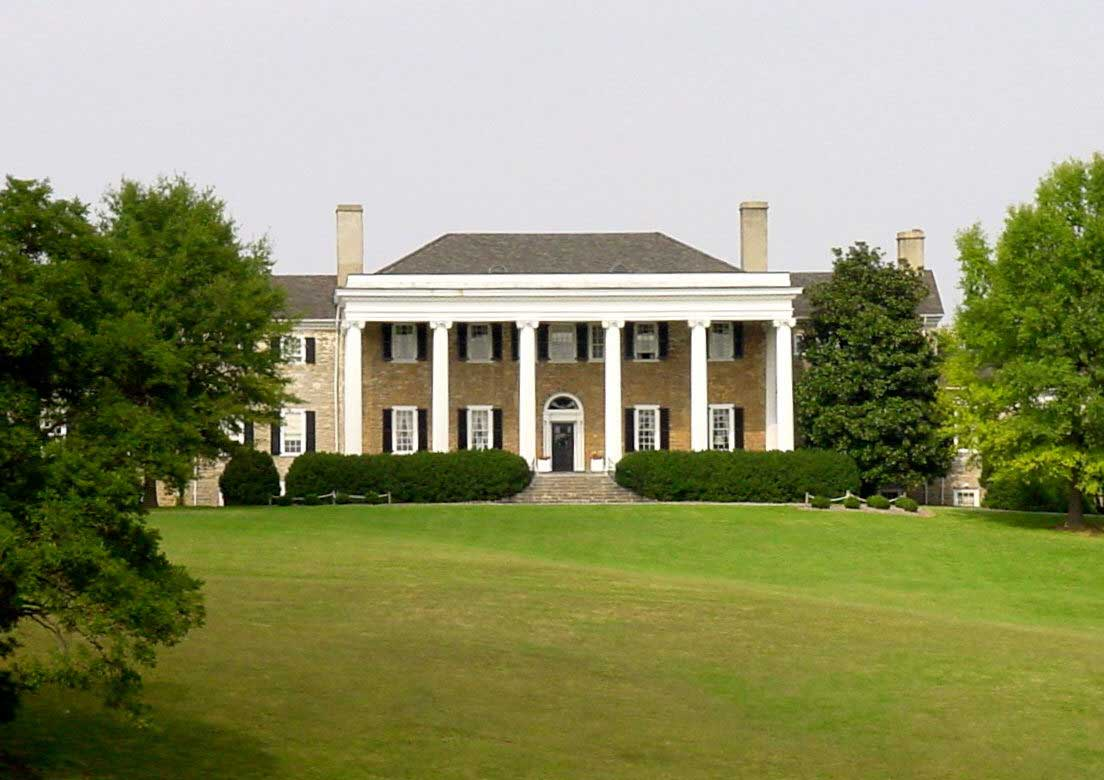
Carter Hall

Listed on the National Register of Historic Places.

- Burwell-Morgan Mill
- Carter Hall
- Long Branch Plantation
- Millwood Commercial Historic District
- Old Chapel
- River House
