= Mary Elizabeth Pidgeon =

American woman suffrage activist and labor economist

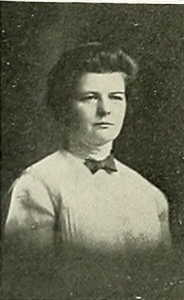
- Born: August 2, 1890
- Died: November 24, 1979 (aged 89)
- Occupation: Economist, pedagogue, political activist

Mary Elizabeth Pidgeon (August 2, 1890, Wadesville, Virginia – November 24, 1979, Sandy Spring, Maryland) was an American woman suffrage activist and labor economist.

== Early life ==
Pidgeon was the daughter of Lewis Pidgeon (1859-1951) and Susan Talbott Williams Pidgeon (1860-1943), members of a long-established Quaker community in Wadesville, in rural Clarke County in northern Virginia. She graduated from the George School, a Pennsylvania Quaker high school, in 1909, and Swarthmore College in 1913, majoring in English. After college she spent 1914 to 1916 as a teacher at the Media Friends School in Media, Pennsylvania.

== Woman Suffrage ==
In 1917 Pidgeon became an organizer for the National American Woman Suffrage Association. She worked first in Buffalo, New York and then in Auburn and in the Fifth Congressional District in Brooklyn, organizing events and speaking. After the successful vote for woman suffrage in New York in November 1917, she was sent to South Dakota where she organized, spoke, and worked for the South Dakota Universal Franchise League. Woman suffrage was enacted there in November 1918.

Pidgeon was sent next to her native Virginia. She worked in various parts of the state until early 1920, when the General Assembly rejected the Nineteenth Amendment. She contributed an article on the situation in Virginia to the February 1920 issue of The Woman Citizen, the national organ of NAWSA. In preparation for women voting for the first time in November 1920, the Equal Suffrage League and the University of Virginia Extension Bureau cooperated on citizenship classes, and Pidgeon became the state director. She continued to run the citizenship program and teach until 1926.

== Virginia politics ==
Pidgeon was a member of the steering committee for the foundation of the Virginia League of Women Voters in 1920. She became involved in Virginia politics, supporting a constitutional amendment promoting roadbuilding and becoming a vice president of the Virginia Good Roads Association. In August 1921 she was elected to the central committee of the Virginia Democratic Party. She helped organize a state conference on efficiency in state government in November 1921, responding to a call by the National League of Women Voters, and for much of the 1920s she headed the League's efficient government department in Virginia. In 1924 she completed a master's degree in political science at the University of Virginia, and in 1926 entered a doctoral program in political science at the University of Chicago. In the summer of 1925 she attended a program in Geneva, Switzerland about the League of Nations.

== Labor economics ==
In 1928 Pidgeon left her academic studies and went to work at the United States Women's Bureau, part of the United States Department of Labor. Initially an assistant editor, in 1930 she was made director of the Bureau's department of research, and in the 1940s she was chief of the Economic Studies Section. She was the sole or principal author on over 30 publications during her time at the Bureau. Pidgeon retired in 1956.

Pidgeon was one of the Women's Bureau members involved in the Women's Charter movement, a coalition of disparate groups including Communists and labor activists who opposed the proposed Equal Rights Amendment in favor of a broader document that would also preserve labor regulations aimed at providing special protections for women. The movement collapsed after 1938 with increasing opposition to Communist involvement.

== Activity in Friends community ==
When Pidgeon moved to Washington, D.C., in 1930 she became a founding member of the Friends Meeting there. She served as Recording Clerk at the Monthly and Quarterly Meeting levels, and contributed occasionally to Quaker publications, such as a review of Betty Friedan's The Feminine Mystique and other feminist works that appeared in the January 1, 1971 Friends Journal.

In 1967 Pidgeon moved to Friends House, a newly-founded Quaker retirement community in Sandy Spring, Maryland, where she died of a heart attack on November 24, 1979. She is buried in the cemetery of the Hopewell Friends Meeting House near her family's home.
