= Pigeon Hill =

Pigeon Hill may refer to:

== United States ==
- Pigeon Hill (New York), an elevation in Otsego County, New York
- Pigeon Hill, Clarke County, Virginia
- Pigeon Hill, Essex County, Virginia, Essex County, Virginia

== Canada ==
- Pigeon Hill, New Brunswick, a local service district in Gloucester County
- Pigeon Hill (St. Armand), former village that is now part of the municipality of Saint-Armand, Quebec
