= William T. Kerfoot =

American politician (1843–1936)

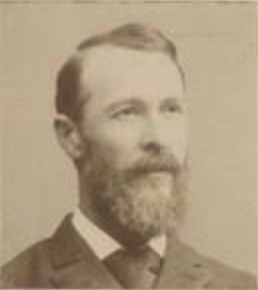

Member of the Virginia House of Delegates for Clarke and Warren
- In office December 2, 1891 – December 6, 1893
- Preceded by: Henry H. Downing
- Succeeded by: Henry H. Downing

Personal details
- Born: William Turner Kerfoot; September 26, 1843 Clarke, Virginia, U.S.
- Died: June 7, 1936 (aged 92) Front Royal, Virginia, U.S.
- Party: Democratic
- Spouse: Ella Chapin

Military service
- Allegiance: Confederate States
- Branch/service: Confederate States Army
- Years of service: 1862–1865
- Unit: 7th Virginia Cavalry; 6th Virginia Cavalry
- Battles/wars: American Civil War

William Turner Kerfoot (September 26, 1843 – June 7, 1936) was an American politician who served in the Virginia House of Delegates.
