= Henry Downing =

Henry Downing may refer to:

- Henry Francis Downing (1846–1928), African-American sailor, politician, dramatist and novelist
- Henry H. Downing (1853–1919), American politician in Virginia
