= Smithfield Farm =

Historic house in Virginia, United States

- U.S. National Register of Historic Places
- Virginia Landmarks Register
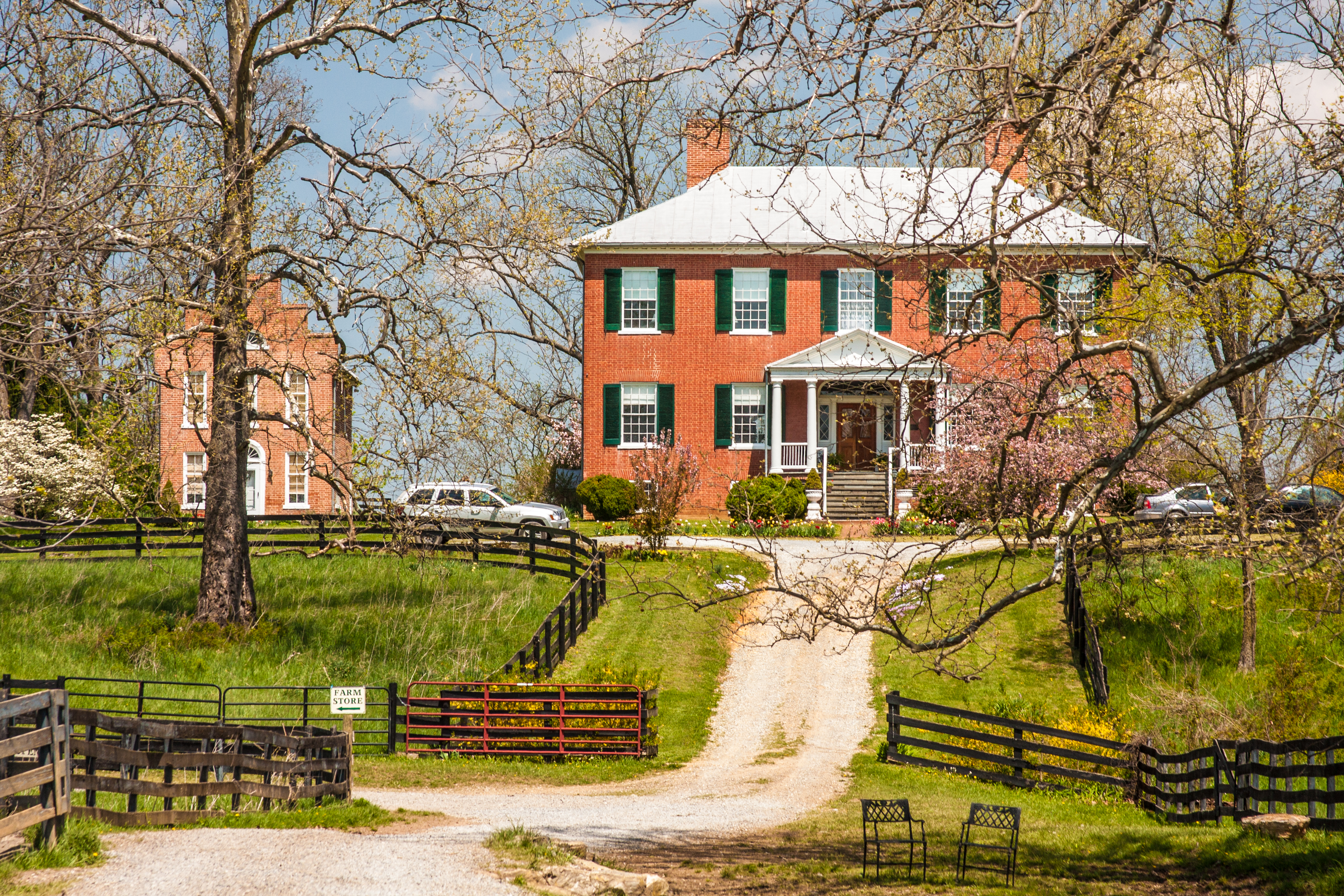
- Smithfield, April 2013

- Location within Northern Virginia Location within Virginia Location within the United States
- Location: 568 Smithfield Ln., near Berryville, Virginia
- Coordinates: 39°10′15″N 77°54′02″W
- Area: 347 acres (140 ha)
- Built: c. 1820
- Architectural style: Federal
- NRHP reference No.: 01000148
- VLR No.: 021-0349

Significant dates
- Added to NRHP: February 16, 2001
- Designated VLR: March 15, 2000

Smithfield Farm is a historic plantation house and farm located near Berryville, Clarke County, Virginia, United States. The manor house was completed in 1824, and is a two-story, five-bay, brick dwelling in the Federal style. It has a low-hipped roof and front and rear porticos. Also on the property are a schoolteacher's residence and a combination farm office and a summer kitchen, each with stepped parapet faҫades. Also on the property are the contributing large brick bank barn (1822), a brick equipment shed, a slave quarters, and a stone stable, all built around 1820, and a wooden barn (c. 1830).

It was listed on the National Register of Historic Places in 2001. Presently the house is a popular bed & breakfast, and home to organic farmer and New York Times best-selling author Forrest Pritchard, son of Ruth Smith Pritchard, owner of the bed and breakfast and a direct descendant of the original owners of Smithfield.
