= Saratoga, Virginia =

Saratoga is the name of several unincorporated communities in the U.S. state of Virginia, United States.

- Saratoga, Buckingham County, Virginia
- Saratoga, Clarke County, Virginia
- Saratoga, Fairfax County, Virginia
