= Bank of Clarke County =

Bank of Clarke
- Type: Privately held company
- Industry: Banking
- Founded: April 1, 1881; 145 years ago
- Headquarters: Berryville, Virginia
- Key people: John R. Milleson, President & CEO; Kathleen J. Chappell, CFO
- Total assets: $730.525 million (2017)
- Total equity: $80.050 million (2017)
- Website: www.bankofclarke.com

Bank of Clarke is a bank headquartered in Berryville, Virginia. It has 13 branches, all of which are in Virginia.

== History ==
The bank was established on April 1, 1881. At that time, Clarke County, Virginia, did not have a bank after the bank failure of the Bank of Berryville in 1878. A.M. Moore Jr., one of the founders of the bank, was named the first president. Captain John R. Nunn was named the first cashier, with an annual salary of $300. The bank purchased a lot on North Church Street for construction of its first branch, which opened on December 8, 1881.

In 1999, John R. Milleson was promoted to president and chief executive officer of the bank.

The bank declined to receive investment from the Troubled Asset Relief Program.
