= R. S. Blackburn Smith =

American politician

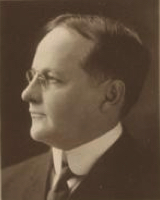

Member of the Virginia Senate from the 12th district
- In office January 10, 1912 – January 12, 1916
- Preceded by: Richard S. Parks
- Succeeded by: Henry H. Downing

Member of the Virginia House of Delegates for Clarke and Warren
- In office December 4, 1901 – January 10, 1906
- Preceded by: Arthur L. Warthen
- Succeeded by: M. M. Johnson

Personal details
- Born: December 9, 1871 Baltimore, Maryland, U.S.
- Died: July 11, 1928 (aged 56) Berryville, Virginia, U.S.
- Party: Democratic
- Spouse: Helen McGill Leavenworth
- Education: University of Virginia (LL.B.)

Military service
- Allegiance: United States
- Branch/service: United States Army
- Years of service: 1898
- Rank: First sergeant
- Battles/wars: Spanish–American War

Richard Scott Blackburn Smith (December 9, 1871 – July 11, 1928) was an American Democratic politician who served as a member of the Virginia Senate, representing the state's 12th district.

Virginia House of Delegates
Preceded by Arthur L. Warthen	Virginia Delegate for Clarke and Warren; 1901–1906	Succeeded by M. M. Johnson
Senate of Virginia
Preceded by Richard S. Parks	Virginia Senator for the 12th District; 1912–1916	Succeeded by Henry H. Downing
