= Henry H. Downing =

American politician

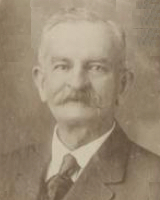

Member of the Virginia Senate from the 12th district
- In office January 12, 1916 – January 28, 1919
- Preceded by: R. S. Blackburn Smith
- Succeeded by: Robert F. Leedy

Member of the Virginia House of Delegates for Clarke and Warren
- In office December 6, 1893 – December 4, 1895
- Preceded by: William T. Kerfoot
- Succeeded by: Samuel S. Thomas
- In office December 4, 1889 – December 2, 1891
- Preceded by: A. Moore Jr.
- Succeeded by: William T. Kerfoot
- In office December 2, 1885 – December 7, 1887
- Preceded by: David Meade
- Succeeded by: A. Moore Jr.

Personal details
- Born: Henry Hawkins Downing; April 20, 1853 Fauquier, Virginia, U.S.
- Died: January 28, 1919 (aged 65) Front Royal, Virginia, U.S.
- Party: Democratic
- Spouse(s): Nannie Turner Byrne; Caroline Elizabeth Long

Henry Hawkins Downing (April 20, 1853 – January 28, 1919) was an American Democratic politician who served as a member of the Virginia Senate, representing the state's 12th district.

Virginia House of Delegates
Preceded by David Meade	Virginia Delegate for Clarke and Warren; 1885–1887; 1889–1891; 1893–1895	Succeeded by A. Moore Jr.
Preceded by A. Moore Jr.	Virginia Delegate for Clarke and Warren; 1885–1887; 1889–1891; 1893–1895	Succeeded by William T. Kerfoot
Preceded by William T. Kerfoot	Virginia Delegate for Clarke and Warren; 1885–1887; 1889–1891; 1893–1895	Succeeded by Samuel S. Thomas
Senate of Virginia
Preceded by R. S. Blackburn Smith	Virginia Senator for the 12th District; 1916–1919	Succeeded by Robert F. Leedy
