= A. Moore Jr. =

American politician and lawyer (1846–1929)

Member of the Virginia House of Delegates from the Clarke and Warren district
- In office December 8, 1887 – March 5, 1888
- Preceded by: Henry H. Downing
- Succeeded by: Henry H. Downing

Personal details
- Born: May 30, 1846 Clarke County, Virginia, U.S.
- Died: January 17, 1929 (aged 82) Berryville, Virginia, U.S.
- Resting place: Green Hill Cemetery
- Party: Democratic
- Spouse(s): Cornelia D. Ellet; Annie B. Cabell
- Children: 9
- Relatives: R. Walton Moore (cousin)
- Education: University of Virginia School of Law
- Occupation: Politician; lawyer; bank president

A. Moore Jr. (May 30, 1846 – January 17, 1929) was an American politician and lawyer from Virginia. He served as a member of the Virginia House of Delegates, representing Clarke and Warren, from 1887 to 1888.

== Early life and education ==
A. Moore Jr. was born on May 30, 1846, in Clarke County, Virginia, to Mary (née Brewer) and A. Moore. He studied at Berryville Academy up until 1862. His brother William B. Moore died from wounds from the Battle of Five Forks. His cousin was U.S. Representative R. Walton Moore.

Moore later attended the University of Virginia School of Law and graduated in 1869.

== Career ==
Moore joined Company D of the 6th Virginia Cavalry Regiment of the Confederate States Army in 1862. He was captured during the Battle of Yellow Tavern. He was incarcerated at Point Lookout. He escaped while the prisoners were being taken to Elmira, New York. He then rejoined his company.

Moore taught school in Staunton and Petersburg. After graduating from law school, Moore practiced law in Berryville. He had a law practice with Major Angus McDonald. He retired from practicing law in 1921.

Moore was a Democrat. He served as a member of the Virginia House of Delegates, representing Clarke and Warren counties from December 8, 1887, to March 5, 1888. In 1892, Moore was a presidential elector. He was a candidate for the U.S. Congress against Smith Turner.

Moore was president of the Bank of Clarke County. He was an organizer and promoter of the Northern Virginia Power Company. He was known as the auctioneer of the Shenandoah Valley Railroad when it was auctioned off to the Norfolk and Western Railway.

== Personal life ==
Moore married Cornelia D. Ellet, daughter of Colonel Charles Ellet Jr. He later married Annie B. Cabell around 1879. He had at least nine children, including William Cabell, Mrs. Eric Miller, Mrs. Samuel Williams, Mrs. W. B. Stalnaker, Mrs. C. P. McIntosh, Annie, Joseph F., Charles and John. His son William Cabell Moore was a physician in Norfolk. Moore was a vestryman with the Episcopal Church.

Moore died from pneumonia on January 17, 1929, at his home in Berryville. He was buried at Green Hill Cemetery.
