= Wickliffe, Virginia =

Unincorporated community in Virginia, United States

- Unincorporated community
- Location within the Commonwealth of Virginia Wickliffe (Virginia) Wickliffe (the United States)
- Coordinates: 39°9′58″N 77°53′32″W
- Country: United States
- State: Virginia
- County: Clarke
- Time zone: UTC−5 (Eastern (EST))
  - Summer (DST): UTC−4 (EDT)

Wickliffe is an unincorporated community in Clarke County in the U.S. state of Virginia.
