= Bethel, Clarke County, Virginia =

Unincorporated community in Virginia, United States

- Unincorporated community
- Location within the Commonwealth of Virginia Bethel (Virginia) Bethel (the United States)
- Coordinates: 39°1′51″N 78°2′36″W
- Country: United States
- State: Virginia
- County: Clarke
- Time zone: UTC−5 (Eastern (EST))
  - Summer (DST): UTC−4 (EDT)

Bethel is an unincorporated community that lies on Long Branch, a tiny stream that runs into the Shenandoah River in Clarke County, Virginia, United States. It lies at the crossroads of Swift Shoals and Kennel Roads.

== Etymology ==
Bethel takes its name from the Old Bethel Church there.
