= Handley Regional Library System =

Handley Regional Library System serves the city of Winchester and counties of Frederick and Clarke in Virginia. The library system is within Region 6 of Virginia Library Association (VLA).

== Service area ==
According to the FY 2014 Institute of Museum and Library Services Data Catalog, the Library System has a service area population of 119,534 with one central library and two branch libraries.

== Branches ==
- Bowman Library (Stephens City) established 2001.
- Clarke County Library (Berryville) established in 1985.
- Handley Library (Winchester) established 1913.
