= Castlemans Ferry, Virginia =

Unincorporated community in Virginia, United States

- Unincorporated community
- Location within the Commonwealth of Virginia Castlemans Ferry (Virginia) Castlemans Ferry (the United States)
- Coordinates: 39°7′13″N 77°53′26″W
- Country: United States
- State: Virginia
- County: Clarke
- Elevation: 423 ft (129 m)
- Time zone: UTC−5 (Eastern (EST))
  - Summer (DST): UTC−4 (EDT)
- GNIS feature ID: 1690556

Castlemans Ferry is an unincorporated community on the Shenandoah River in Clarke County, Virginia, United States. State Route 7 crosses the Shenandoah via the Castlemans Ferry Bridge here.

== History ==
David D. Casselman was probably born near Albany, New York about 1734. Around the year 1750 the family moved to Hampshire County, Virginia, where his father Andreas and his older brother William had received land grants from Lord Fairfax of Virginia on August 23, 1749. Their name was changed to Castleman on the paperwork for the land grants.

Around 1756, David married Margaret Johnson, born about 1737 in Virginia. Margaret descended on her mother's side from the Hampton family (for whom Hampton, Virginia is named). They bought "Head Spring" farm at Summit Point, Frederick County, Virginia (now Jefferson County, West Virginia) in 1762 and sold it ten years later in 1772 when he purchased "Glen Owen" Farm from Squire & Mrs. George Washington.

"Glen Owen" was located in Frederick County, Virginia (now Clarke County, Virginia), about three miles east of Berryville, between Berryville and Bluemont on the west bank of the Shenandoah River, on what is today's "Historic Scenic Highway" State Route 7. His son David Jr. at one time operated a ferry service across the Shenandoah River near there and the bridge that eventually replaced the ferry service was officially named the "Castlemans Ferry Bridge".

Castleman's Ferry was the site of the 1864 Battle of Cool Spring during the American Civil War. It was also the site of several cavalry skirmishes between the partisan Mosby's Rangers and various elements of Union cavalry and infantry.
