= Pigeon Hill, Clarke County, Virginia =

Unincorporated community in Virginia, United States

- Unincorporated community
- Location within the Commonwealth of Virginia Pigeon; Hill (Virginia) Pigeon; Hill (the United States)
- Coordinates: 39°7′31″N 77°59′52″W
- Country: United States
- State: Virginia
- County: Clarke
- Time zone: UTC−5 (Eastern (EST))
  - Summer (DST): UTC−4 (EDT)

Pigeon Hill is an unincorporated community in Clarke County, Virginia, United States. Pigeon Hill lies on the Lord Fairfax Highway (U.S. Route 340) south of Berryville.

The community was founded after 1870, when Ellen McCormick, a White widow, financed the purchase of plots by formerly enslaved Black families.
