= Saratoga, Clarke County, Virginia =

Unincorporated community in Virginia, United States

Saratoga, Virginia
- Unincorporated community
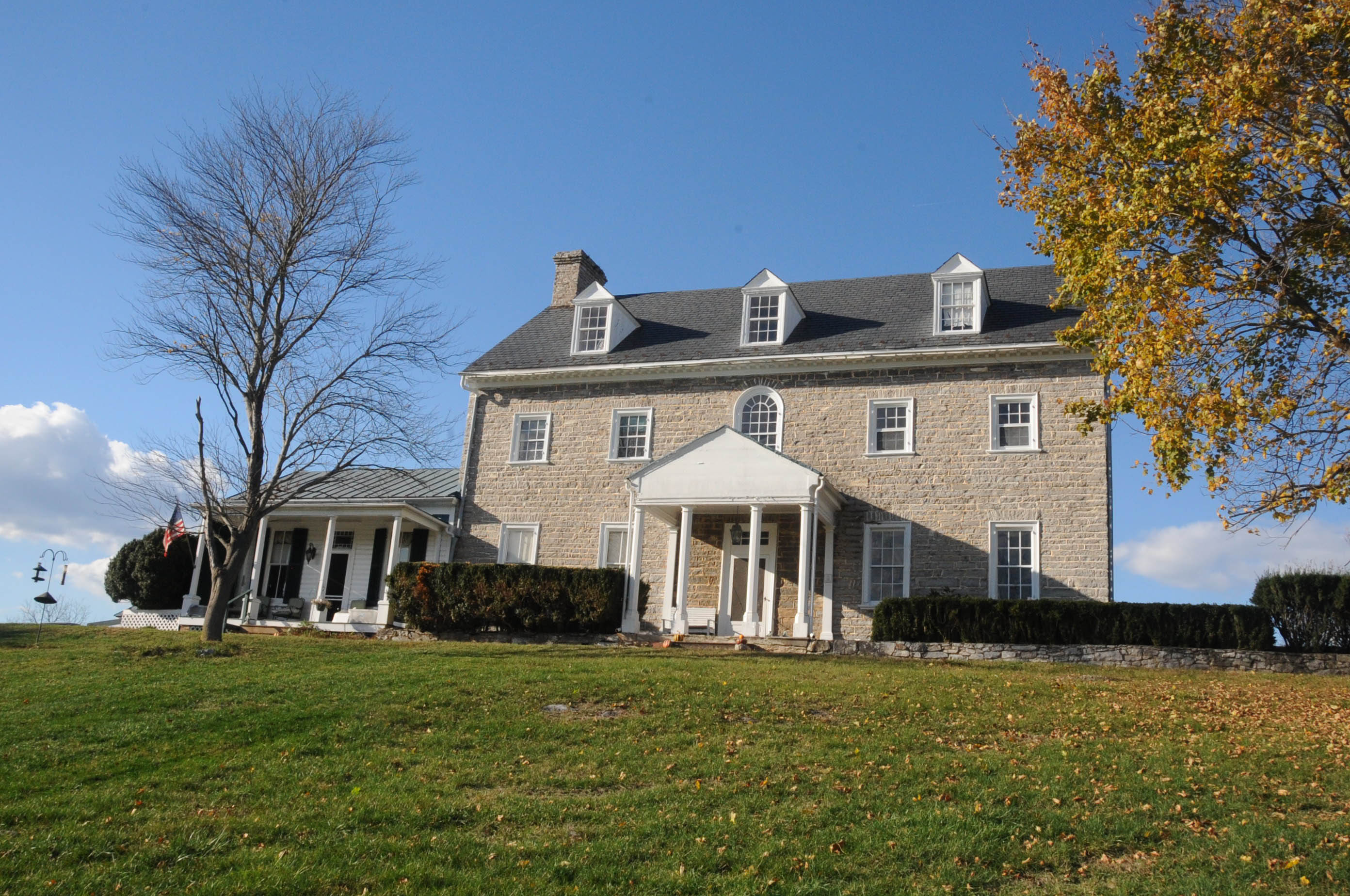
- Saratoga plantation

- Location within the Commonwealth of Virginia Saratoga (Virginia) Saratoga (the United States)
- Coordinates: 39°4′59″N 78°3′34″W
- Country: United States
- State: Virginia
- County: Clarke
- Time zone: UTC−5 (Eastern (EST))
  - Summer (DST): UTC−4 (EDT)

Saratoga is an unincorporated community in Clarke County, Virginia, United States. Saratoga lies to the south of Boyce and is part of the Boyce Historic District. Saratoga derives its name from the Saratoga plantation Daniel Morgan built here in 1782. The home itself is named for the American Revolutionary War battles of Saratoga, New York, in which Morgan played an important role.
