= Wadesville, Virginia =

Unincorporated community in Virginia, United States

- Unincorporated community
- Location within the Commonwealth of Virginia Wadesville (Virginia) Wadesville (the United States)
- Coordinates: 39°14′33″N 78°2′20″W
- Country: United States
- State: Virginia
- County: Clarke
- Time zone: UTC−5 (Eastern (EST))
  - Summer (DST): UTC−4 (EDT)

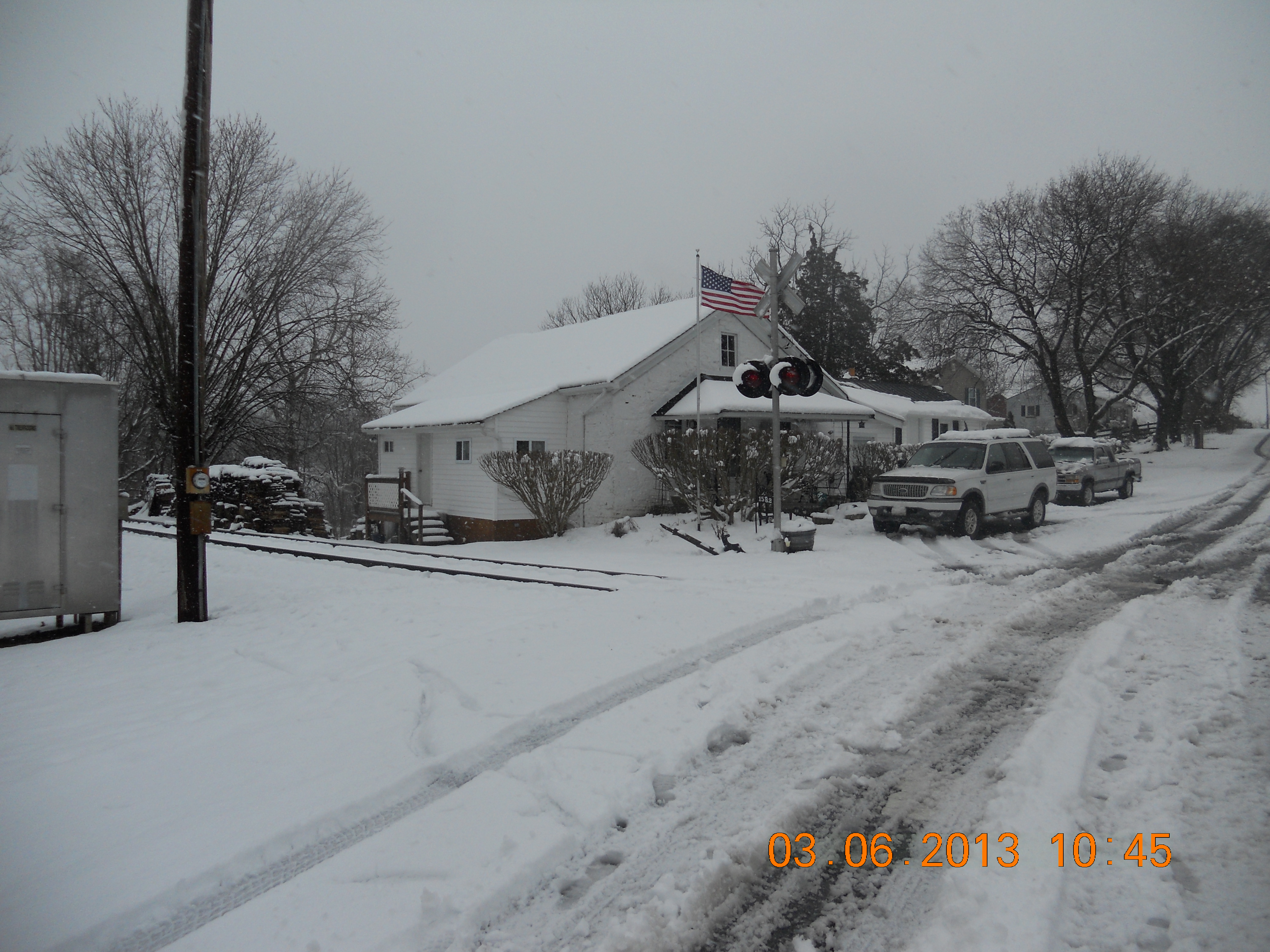
Old Freight Warehouse at Wadesville Crossing

Wadesville is an unincorporated community in Clarke County in the U.S. state of Virginia. Wadesville is located along Opequon Creek at Locke's Ford.

== History ==
=== Early history ===
Wadesville traces its beginnings to the construction of the Winchester and Potomac Railroad. By November 1834, grading, bridging and masonry work on the first 24 miles of the 32 mile long rail line were complete. The railroad opened for operation on March 13, 1836. Wadesville Station was just past mile 22 of the line from Harpers Ferry to Winchester. Wadesville and nearby Swimley Station were bustling communities when they were the only train stops in the county.

=== Civil War ===
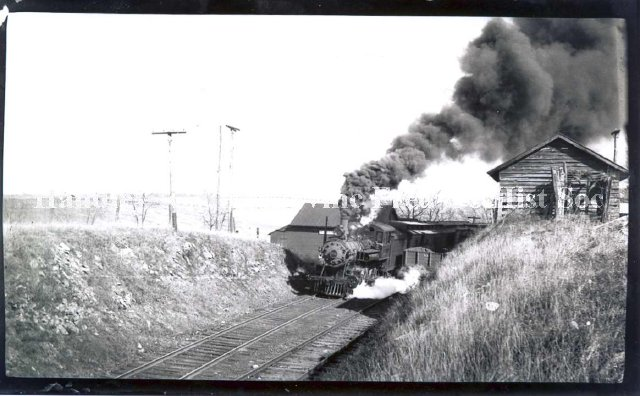
Train Leaving Wadesville Station for Winchester, c. 1910

Locke's Ford was the site of numerous skirmishes during the Civil War. The two largest were just before the 2nd and 3rd Battles of Winchester.

==== Second Battle of Winchester ====
As part of Confederate General Robert E. Lee's Gettysburg Campaign, his Second Corps under General Richard S. Ewell was sent to clear the Shenandoah Valley of Union troops.

On the morning of Saturday, June 13, 1863, General Ewell took two of his divisions towards Winchester to attack the Union troops under General Robert Milroy. Ewell's remaining division advanced on Berryville under the command of General Robert E. Rodes. Berryville was held by the Union troops of Colonel Andrew T. McReynold's brigade. McReynold's Brigade was under the overall command of General Milroy in Winchester.

Upon the approach of Rode's Division, Colonel McReynolds evacuated the town. The most direct route back to the forts of Winchester was west on the Berryville Pike. He chose to head north on the Charles Town Road turning northwest to Summit Point and then head west to the Valley Pike. He would then head south on Valley Pike to Winchester.

The Summit Point Road roughly paralleled the Winchester & Potomac Railroad tracks and passed through Locke's Ford on modern day Swimley Road on its way through Brucetown to Clear Brook some three miles from the ford at the Valley Pike. The head of McReynolds' column reached Valley Pike about the same time his rear guard under Lieutenant Colonel William McKellip reached the ford. The rear guard consisted of Companies E and H of the 6th Maryland Infantry and a battalion of the 1st New York Cavalry.

Between 5:00 and 6:00 p.m., 350 men of the 36th Virginia Cavalry Battalion under the command of Major James W. Sweeney neared the ford from the east-northeast down the Charles Town Road, now Swimley Road. Sweeney bypassed the rear guard by swinging diagonally through some woods to the south and emerging just beyond the sharp turn in the road before the ford. A Yankee messenger spotted the Rebs and reported to the 1st New York Cavalry of their approach. The commander of the 1st New York deployed his troopers just as the 36th Virginia attacked. The 1st New York fell back to the ford. As the 1st New York fell back, Lieutenant Eugene Alexander's section of the Baltimore Artillery (Union) was crossing Opequon Creek. While the fighting swirled around, Alexander was able to pull one of his guns up the steep embankment on the west side of the creek, unlimber, and fire a double load of canister shot at the Rebel horsemen. The 6th Maryland posted a company of infantry on either side of the gun. The 36th Virginia reformed and charged again, but were met by fierce fire from four companies of the 6th Maryland, additional grape and canister shot from the Baltimore Battery and a countercharge from the 1st New York Cavalry. The 36th Virginia pulled back with multiple casualties including Major Sweeney who sustained a severe arm wound and lung injury. Lieutenant William Hall of the 1st New York Cavalry later stated: "the fight lasted but thirty minutes, but was one of the most desperate I ever witnessed in my more than four years' service. In this little engagement... the loss on our side was two killed, five wounded and two captured." The 36th Virginia lost four men killed and several wounded, including their commander. The KIA were John W. Anderson, James Coffman, Daniel Keiser and Clinton Dufield.

The 1st New York Cavalry and the 6th Maryland Intantry held their position on the banks of Opequon Creek for about an hour until they were sure that the Rebels had left, then resumed their retreat to Winchester.

==== Third Battle of Winchester ====
The situation in September 1864 was that Confederate General Jubal Early had the 15,514 men of his Army of the Valley on the west side of Opequon Creek in the lower Shenandoah Valley from Winchester to Martinsburg. Yankee General Philip Sheridan had the 41,173 men of his Army of the Shenandoah on the east side of Opequon Creek from Harpers Ferry to Berryville.

Leading up to the battle, this entire area was a tense place. Prior to the battle, one of the units patrolling the area east of the ford was the 2nd Massachusetts Cavalry. Any time that Yankee units would come into view of the Confederates picketing Locke's Ford, they would come under fire. Such was the case on September 13 when Corporal Valorous Dearborn of Company A was shot off of his horse and killed. !t was also the case the following day when troopers Alexander Logan, John Shiffer and Winfield Wilber of Companies D, F and I respectively were shot and killed.

The 22nd Virginia Cavalry and the 51st Virginia Infantry regiments defended the west bank of Locke's Ford. Early on the morning of September 19, at around 2:00 a.m. Brigadier General George Armstrong Custer's Michigan Brigade broke camp at Summit Point and began moving toward Locke's Ford. Arriving on the east bank of the ford around 5:00 a.m., the 6th Michigan Cavalry dismounted and moved into position on the hill overlooking the ford around a farmhouse and some outbuildings. The 7th Michigan Cavalry and the 25th New York Cavalry charged the ford while under cover of the 6th Michigan with their Spencer repeating rifles. The Federals attempted to cross the creek multiple times and were pushed back each time. Finally, after the 2nd U.S. Cavalry, the 5th U.S. Cavalry and the 2nd Massachusetts Cavalry pushed across Rocky Ford a mile or so to the south of Locke's Ford, they threatened the rear of the Confederate line along the creek. The 51st Virginia Infantry and the 22nd Virginia Cavalry along with the 45th Virginia Infantry withdrew through Brucetown to the west. The Michigan Brigade was able to then cross Opequon Creek after about two hours.

=== Fire at the Station, January 7, 1916 ===
"The store building and Baltimore and Ohio Railroad station and post office at Wadesville, Clarke County, just across the Frederick County line, were totally destroyed by fire which broke out at 3 o'clock this morning, and the origin of which is unknown. Nothing is left of the building and platform but a pile of ashes, and nothing was saved from the building, the fire having gained too much headway bvefore it was discovered. Neighbors succeeded by working in the cold and snow, in preventing the nearby group of buildings from catching."

=== Bridge at Locke's Ford ===
"A movement which has recently been started, to erect a substantial bridge over the Opequon at Wadesville on the line between Frederick and Clarke counties, is meeting with much favor and indications are that the project will be carried through. The structure under contemplation is to span the Opequon at a dangerous ford where the stream is crossed by the road from Brucetown to Wadesville. It is planned to build a steel bridge with concrete abutments, the cost, estimated at about $4000, to be borne by Clarke and Frederick counties, by state aid, and by private subscriptions,"- November 9, 1915

"At a joint meeting of the Boards of Supervisors of Clarke and Frederick counties, held in Winchester this week, bids were received for the construction of a bridge over Opequon Creek at Wadesville, which is the dividing line between the two counties. The successful bidders for the concrete bridge was the Monongahela Valley Engineering Co. of Morgantown, W.Va. at their price of $8,964.07. The cost is borne one-half by the state of Virginia and one fourth each of the county of Clarke and the County of Frederick."- February 8, 1917.

The bridge was constructed over the ford in 1917 by the Monongahela Valley Engineering Company of Morgantown, West Virginia.

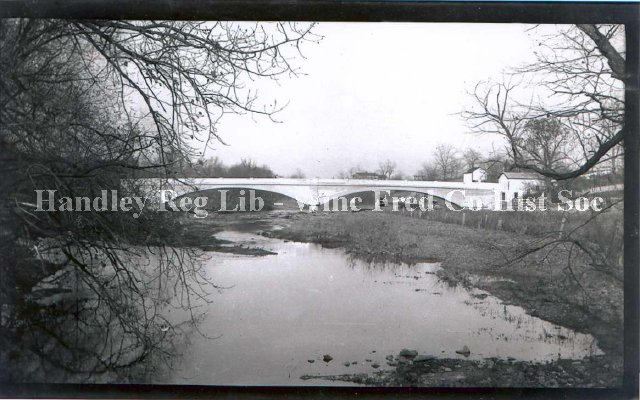
Locke's Ford Bridge, c. 1917

"The new concrete bridge over the Opequon Creek at Wadesville, one of the most unique structures of its kind in the state, is now ready for traffic. The four approaches to the bridge have been filled in and vehicles can now pass over it. Highways from four different directions lead to this bridge and join there. The bridge was badly needed there. There have been narrow escapes from drowning in the Opequon at that point. Motorists also have been stranded in the middle of the creek, not knowing the ford. The state built the bridge at a cost of about $10,000. The counties of Clarke and Frederick paid one-half the cost of filling in the approaches."- March 22, 1919.

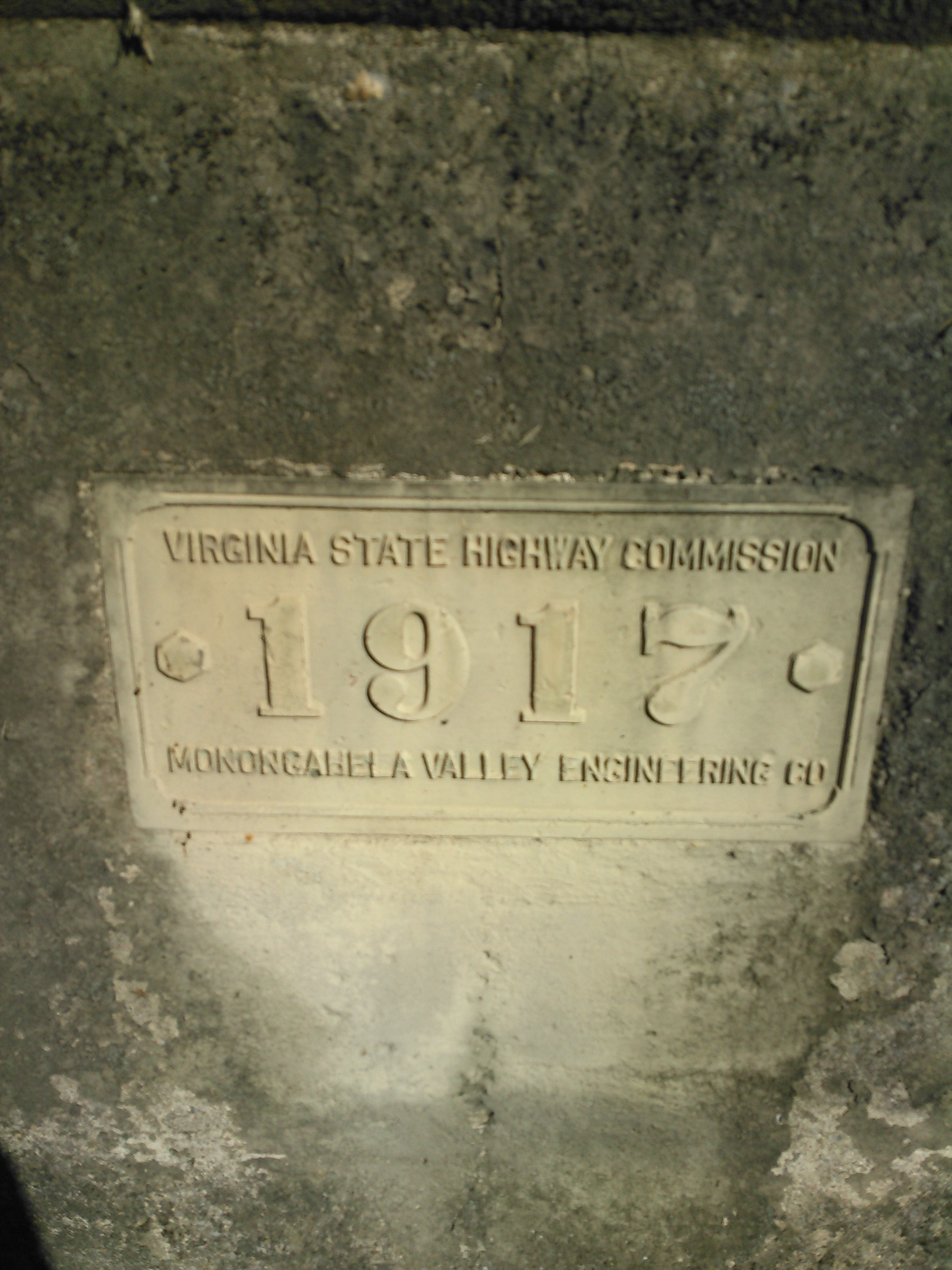
Locke's Ford Bridge- Nameplate

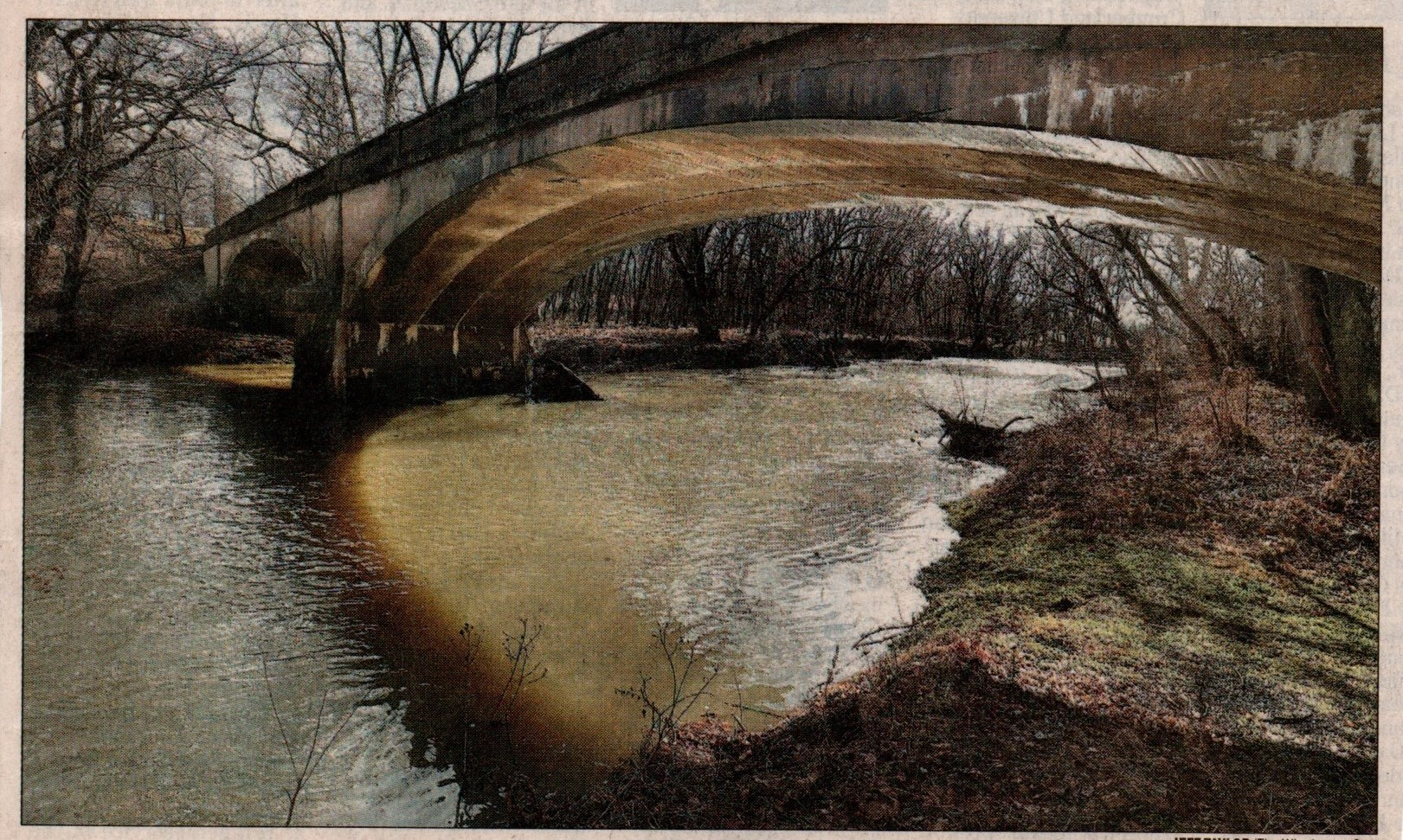
Locke's Ford Bridge- 2018-01-24. View from the west side of Opequon Creek looking upstream. Used with permission of the photographer, Jeff Taylor.

=== Fire at the Station, December 30, 1941 ===
"WADESVILLE- Fire of undetermined origin completely destroyed the building housing the Baltimore and Ohio passenger station, the post office and the general merchandise store of William Eleyette here early this morning. The John H. Enders Fire Company of Berryville responded to an alarm, but despite a fast trip, arrived too late to render assistance other than to remove threats to a stone building used as a garage which was situated on the opposite side of the railway tracks. Today, persons were unable to account for the fire unless it originated from rats chewing matches, from a defective flue or a hot stove. The building was not wired for electricity. It was stated in Winchester that the Wadesville station has been in operation by the B&O for 50 years. It also was learned that on two previous occasions, stations at Wadesville were destroyed by fire, although they were not at the same location."

=== Wadesville station postmasters ===
The following is a list of postmasters at the Wadesville Post Office and the date they were appointed.

1. John H.P. Stone 08-13-1850
2. Daniel Wade 12-18-1858
3. Samuel L. Pidgeon 06-12-1865
4. Samuel J. Swimley 01-04-1875
5. Bettie A. Wade 04-07-1879
6. Henry R. W. Kont 11-30-1888
7. Wiliam C. Alther 08-03-1889
8. Samuel L. Pidgeon 05-21-1897
9. Lewis Pidgeon 03-19-1900
10. William R. Elyett (Acting) 02-28-1940
11. Elwood R. Elyett 04-02-1940

Post Office closed 03-31-1954

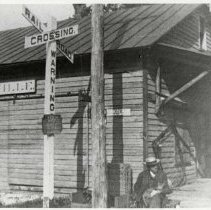
Wadesville train station circa 1910 with Tommie Carter out front

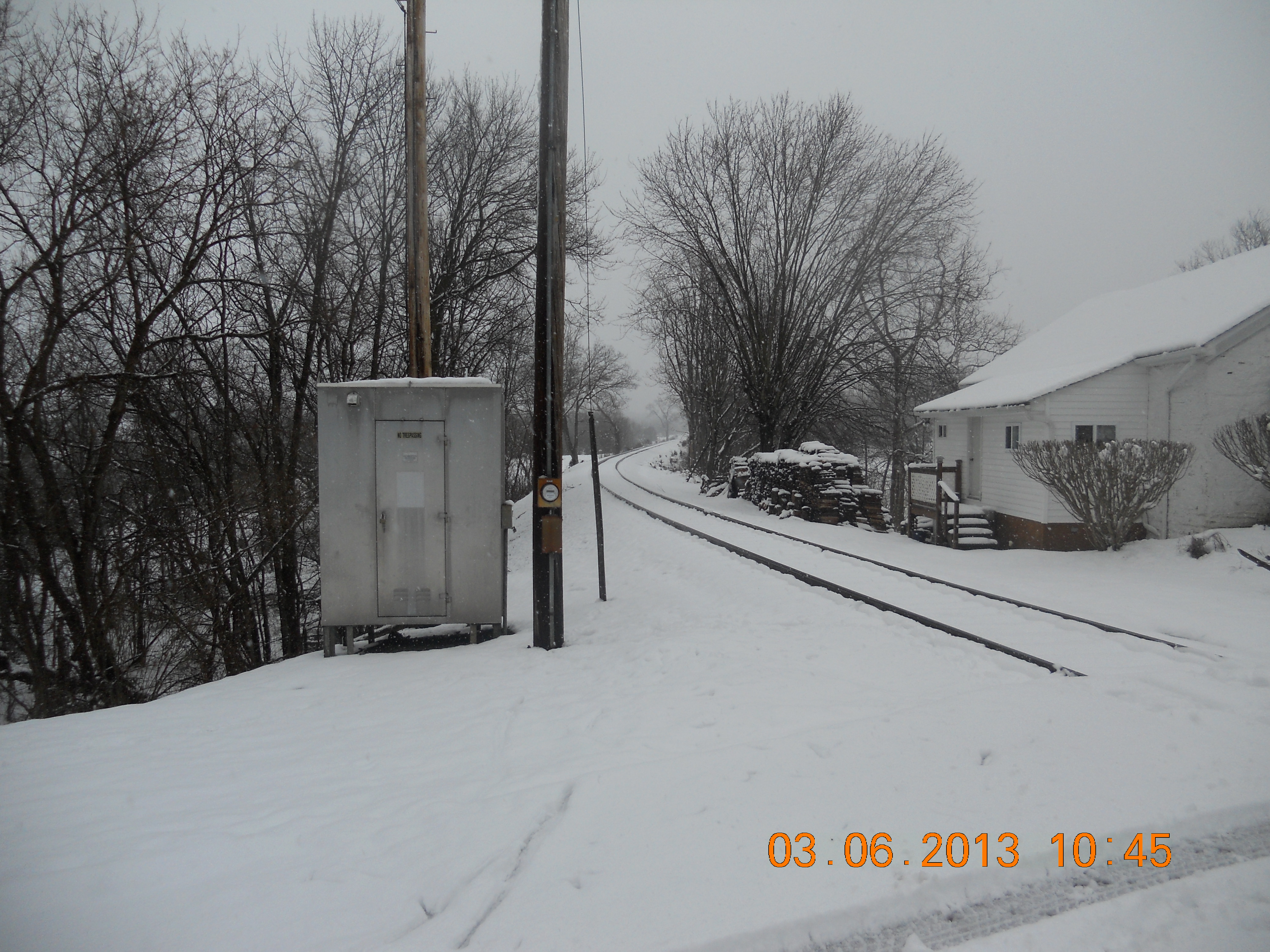
Looking east from Wadesville crossing.
