= Forrest Pritchard =

Farmer and author

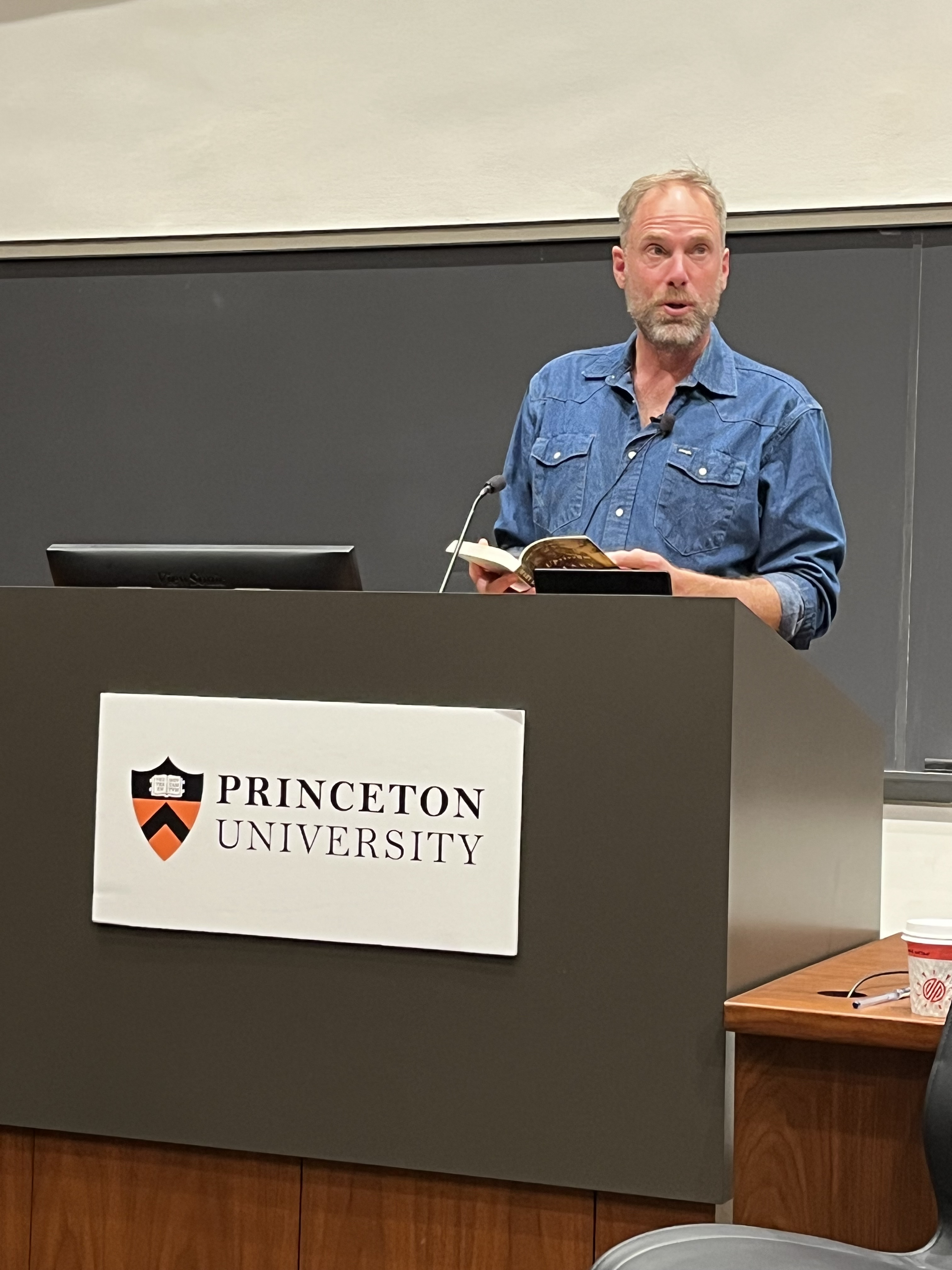
- Pritchard lecturing in Princeton, NJ
- Born: Forrest Pritchard; June 1, 1974 (age 52)
- Education: BA English, BS Geology
- Alma mater: College of William & Mary
- Writing career
- Notable works: Gaining Ground, Growing Tomorrow, Start Your Farm
- Website: www.forrestpritchard.com

Forrest Pritchard (born June 1, 1974) is a New York Times bestselling author, sustainable farmer, and farm-to-table restauranteur. He is a graduate of Episcopal High School and The College of William and Mary, where he won the Academy of American Poets prize in 1996. His books include the New York Times bestseller Gaining Ground, A Story of Farmers' Markets, Local Food and Saving the Family Farm (Lyons, 2013, ISBN 9780762787258, no. 19 in E-books non-fiction) named a top read by NPR and Publishers Weekly, and Growing Tomorrow: Behind The Scenes With 18 Sustainable Farmers Who Are Changing The Way We Eat (with Molly Peterson, The Experiment, 2015 ISBN 9781615192847).

== Works ==
- Gaining Ground: A Story of Farmers' Markets, Local Food, and Saving the Family Farm (2013). ISBN 978-0762787258
- Growing Tomorrow: A Farm-to-Table Journey in Photos and Recipes: Behind the Scenes with 18 Extraordinary Sustainable Farmers Who Are Changing the Way We Eat (2015). ISBN 978-1615192847
- Start Your Farm: The Authoritative Guide to Becoming a Sustainable 21st Century Farmer (2018). ISBN 978-1615194896
