= Clarke County, Virginia =

County in Virginia, United States

- County
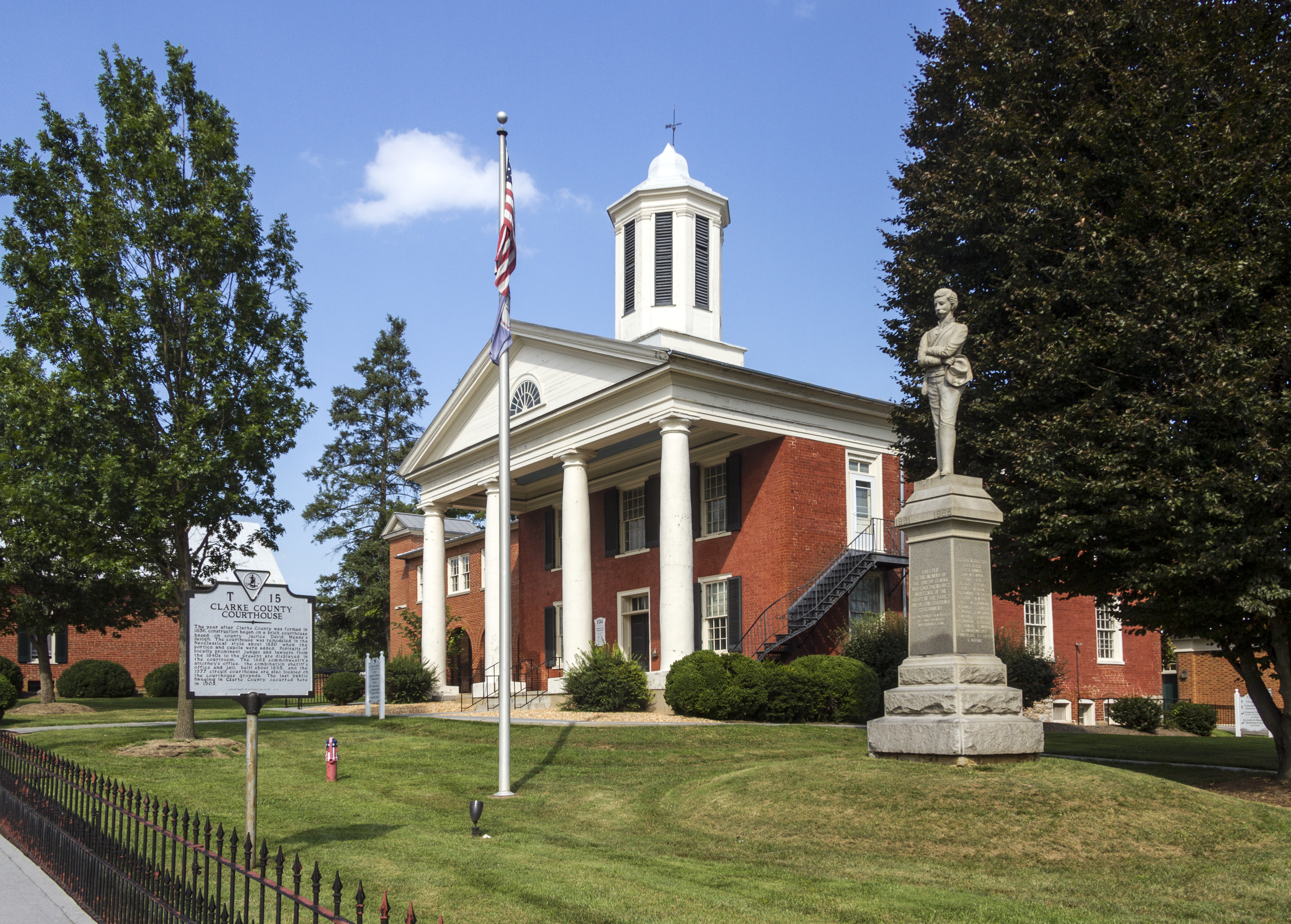
- Old Clarke County Courthouse and Confederate monument

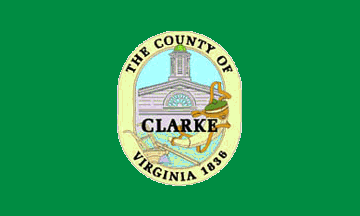
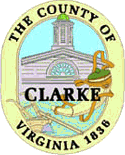
- Flag Seal

- Location within the U.S. state of Virginia
- Coordinates: 39°07′N 78°00′W
- Country: United States
- State: Virginia
- Founded: 1836
- Named for: George Rogers Clark
- Seat: Berryville
- Largest town: Berryville

Area
  - Total: 178 sq mi (460 km^{2})
  - Land: 176 sq mi (460 km^{2})
  - Water: 2.2 sq mi (5.7 km^{2}) 1.2%

Population (2020)
  - Total: 14,783
  - Estimate (2025): 15,609 ▲
  - Density: 84.0/sq mi (32.4/km^{2})
- Time zone: UTC−5 (Eastern)
  - Summer (DST): UTC−4 (EDT)
- Congressional district: 6th
- Website: clarkecounty.gov

Clarke County is a United States county located along the northern border of the Commonwealth of Virginia. Bordering West Virginia, Clarke County forms part of the Washington-Arlington-Alexandria, DC-VA-MD-WV Metropolitan Statistical Area. As of the 2020 census, the county had a population of 14,783. Its county seat is the historic town of Berryville.

The county was established in 1836 from part of Frederick County, and was named for Virginia Revolutionary War hero George Rogers Clark. Historically agrarian, Clarke County is one of the most sparsely populated areas of Northern Virginia.

== History ==
The first settlement of the Virginia Colony in the future Clarke County was in 1736 by Thomas Fairfax, 6th Lord Fairfax of Cameron who built a home, Greenway Court, on part of his 5 million acres (20,000 km^{2}) property, near what is now the village of White Post. White Post was named for the large signpost pointing the way to Lord Fairfax's home.

As it lay just west of the Blue Ridge border demarcated under Governor Spotswood at Albany in 1722, the area was claimed along with the rest of the Shenandoah Valley by the Six Nations Iroquois (who had overrun it during the later Beaver Wars in around 1672), until the Treaty of Lancaster in 1744, when it was purchased from them by Governor Gooch.

Many of the early settlers of what became Clarke County were children of Tidewater planters, who settled on large land grants from Lord Fairfax. Two thirds of the county was settled by the plantation group, and the plantation lifestyle thrived until the Civil War. The new county was formed from Frederick County in 1836, and was named for George Rogers Clark (despite the difference in spelling). Clarke County was known for its large crops of wheat.

During the American Civil War, John S. Mosby, "the Gray Ghost" of the Confederacy, raided General Philip Sheridan's supply train in the summer of 1864, in Berryville. The Battle of Cool Spring was fought in Clarke County on July 17 and 18, 1864, followed by the Battle of Berryville on September 3, 1864.

In 1881 was founded the Bank of Clarke County, a still-functional regional bank with headquarters in Berryville.

Early in the 20th century, the future Virginia politician Harry F. Byrd Sr. and his wife established their first home near Berryville, where he undertook extensive agricultural activity growing peaches and apples. Byrd became a state senator in the upper house of the Virginia General Assembly, served a term as a Governor of Virginia, and was a United States senator for over 30 years. He headed the powerful Byrd Organization, which dominated state politics between the mid-1920s and the 1960s.

In 1996, Forrest Pritchard revitalized Smithfield Farm by starting a grass-fed, sustainable livestock operation. Renamed 'Smith Meadows', it is currently one of the oldest fully grass-finished farms in the United States, and its story was chronicled in the New York Times bestseller Gaining Ground.

== Historic buildings and structures ==
- Clermont Estate (1751)
- Dearmont Hall (1850)
- Fairfield (1765)
- Soldier's Rest (1769)
- Buck Marsh Church (1772)
- Norwood (1780)
- Burwell-Morgan Mill (1782)
- Holy Cross Abbey (1784)
- Audley Estate (1794)
- Bel Voi (1803)
- Long Branch Plantation (1811)
- Rosemont Estate (1811)
- Clay Hill (1816)
- Smithfield Farm (1816)
- Clifton (1833)
- Clarke County Courthouse (1837)
- Stone's Chapel (1848)
- Glendale Farm (1850)
- Site of Mosby's Raid (1863)

== Geography ==

According to the U.S. Census Bureau, the county has a total area of 178 square miles (460 km^{2}), of which 176 square miles (460 km^{2}) is land and 2.2 square miles (5.7 km^{2}) (1.2%) is water. It is the third-smallest county in Virginia by total area.

=== Adjacent counties ===
- Loudoun County – east
- Warren County – southwest
- Fauquier County – southeast
- Frederick County – west
- Jefferson County, West Virginia – north

== Government ==
=== Board of Supervisors ===
- Berryville District: Douglas A. Shaffer (R)
- Buckmarsh District: David S. Weiss (R)
- Millwood District: Terri Catlett (R)
- Russell District: Douglas M. Lawrence (I)
- White Post District: Bev B. McKay (R)

=== Constitutional officers ===
- Clerk of the Circuit Court: April F. Wilkerson (R)
- Commissioner of the Revenue: Donna Mathews Peake (R)
- Commonwealth's Attorney: Matthew E. Bass (I)
- Sheriff: Travis Sumption (R)
- Treasurer: Sharon E. Keeler (D)

Clarke County is represented by Republican Timmy French in the Virginia Senate, Republican Delores Riley Oates in the Virginia House of Delegates, and Republican Ben Cline in the U.S. House of Representatives.

United States presidential election results for Clarke County, Virginia
Year	Republican		Democratic		Third party(ies)	
Year	No.	%	No.	%	No.	%
1912	39	6.19%	576	91.43%	15	2.38%
1916	49	7.66%	590	92.19%	1	0.16%
1920	154	15.78%	774	79.30%	48	4.92%
1924	76	9.76%	687	88.19%	16	2.05%
1928	248	25.10%	740	74.90%	0	0.00%
1932	124	12.74%	841	86.43%	8	0.82%
1936	198	17.35%	940	82.38%	3	0.26%
1940	333	24.13%	1,043	75.58%	4	0.29%
1944	415	33.58%	816	66.02%	5	0.40%
1948	384	33.16%	482	41.62%	292	25.22%
1952	809	52.88%	716	46.80%	5	0.33%
1956	785	48.91%	725	45.17%	95	5.92%
1960	804	46.31%	923	53.17%	9	0.52%
1964	1,068	48.41%	1,136	51.50%	2	0.09%
1968	1,127	42.62%	768	29.05%	749	28.33%
1972	1,816	69.13%	715	27.22%	96	3.65%
1976	1,440	51.54%	1,276	45.67%	78	2.79%
1980	1,876	57.44%	1,156	35.39%	234	7.16%
1984	2,529	67.21%	1,215	32.29%	19	0.50%
1988	2,502	62.24%	1,478	36.77%	40	1.00%
1992	1,994	42.90%	1,811	38.96%	843	18.14%
1996	2,201	48.17%	1,906	41.72%	462	10.11%
2000	2,883	54.56%	2,166	40.99%	235	4.45%
2004	3,741	57.51%	2,699	41.49%	65	1.00%
2008	3,840	51.68%	3,457	46.52%	134	1.80%
2012	4,296	55.35%	3,239	41.73%	227	2.92%
2016	4,661	56.75%	3,051	37.15%	501	6.10%
2020	5,192	55.61%	3,920	41.98%	225	2.41%
2024	5,641	57.33%	3,993	40.58%	205	2.08%

== Demographics ==
Historical population
Census	Pop.	Note	%±
1840	6,353		—
1850	7,352		15.7%
1860	7,146		−2.8%
1870	6,670		−6.7%
1880	7,682		15.2%
1890	8,071		5.1%
1900	7,927		−1.8%
1910	7,468		−5.8%
1920	7,165		−4.1%
1930	7,167		0.0%
1940	7,159		−0.1%
1950	7,074		−1.2%
1960	7,942		12.3%
1970	8,102		2.0%
1980	9,965		23.0%
1990	12,101		21.4%
2000	12,652		4.6%
2010	14,034		10.9%
2020	14,783		5.3%
2025 (est.)	15,609	▲	5.6%
U.S. Decennial Census; 1790–1960 1900–1990; 1990–2000 2010 2020

=== Racial and ethnic composition ===
Clarke County, Virginia – Racial and ethnic composition Note: the US Census treats Hispanic/Latino as an ethnic category. This table excludes Latinos from the racial categories and assigns them to a separate category. Hispanics/Latinos may be of any race.
Race / Ethnicity (NH = Non-Hispanic)	Pop 1980	Pop 1990	Pop 2000	Pop 2010	Pop 2020	% 1980	% 1990	% 2000	% 2010	% 2020
White alone (NH)	8,765	10,916	11,422	12,387	12,309	87.96%	90.21%	90.28%	88.26%	83.26%
Black or African American alone (NH)	1,127	1,052	848	742	564	11.31%	8.69%	6.70%	5.29%	3.82%
Native American or Alaska Native alone (NH)	6	14	23	35	33	0.06%	0.12%	0.18%	0.25%	0.22%
Asian alone (NH)	22	30	61	121	210	0.22%	0.25%	0.48%	0.86%	1.42%
Native Hawaiian or Pacific Islander alone (NH)	x	x	4	5	15	x	x	0.03%	0.04%	0.10%
Other race alone (NH)	5	7	14	15	89	0.05%	0.06%	0.11%	0.11%	0.60%
Mixed race or Multiracial (NH)	x	x	95	239	676	x	x	0.75%	1.70%	4.57%
Hispanic or Latino (any race)	40	82	185	490	887	0.40%	0.68%	1.46%	3.49%	6.00%
Total	9,965	12,101	12,652	14,034	14,783	100.00%	100.00%	100.00%	100.00%	100.00%

=== 2020 census ===
As of the 2020 census, the county had a population of 14,783. The median age was 48.3 years. 19.5% of residents were under the age of 18 and 22.0% of residents were 65 years of age or older. For every 100 females there were 96.2 males, and for every 100 females age 18 and over there were 95.0 males age 18 and over.

The racial makeup of the county was 84.4% White, 3.9% Black or African American, 0.3% American Indian and Alaska Native, 1.4% Asian, 0.1% Native Hawaiian and Pacific Islander, 3.0% from some other race, and 6.8% from two or more races. Hispanic or Latino residents of any race comprised 6.0% of the population.

0.0% of residents lived in urban areas, while 100.0% lived in rural areas.

There were 5,847 households in the county, of which 27.3% had children under the age of 18 living with them and 23.2% had a female householder with no spouse or partner present. About 25.1% of all households were made up of individuals and 12.3% had someone living alone who was 65 years of age or older.

There were 6,371 housing units, of which 8.2% were vacant. Among occupied housing units, 77.3% were owner-occupied and 22.7% were renter-occupied. The homeowner vacancy rate was 1.4% and the rental vacancy rate was 4.8%.

=== 2000 Census ===
As of the census of 2000, there were 12,652 people, 4,942 households, and 3,513 families residing in the county. The population density was 72 inhabitants per square mile (28/km^{2}). There were 5,388 housing units at an average density of 30 units per square mile (12 units/km^{2}). The racial makeup of the county was 91.15% White, 6.73% Black or African American, 0.19% Native American, 0.49% Asian, 0.03% Pacific Islander, 0.55% from other races, and 0.85% from two or more races. 1.46% of the population was Hispanic or Latino of any race.

By 2005 90.1% of Clarke County's population was non-Hispanic whites. 6.3% were African-American. 0.2% Native American. 0.6% Asian. 2.6% were Latino.

There were 4,942 households, out of which 29.40% had children under the age of 18 living with them, 58.20% were married couples living together, 8.90% had a female householder with no husband present, and 28.90% were non-families. 24.10% of all households were made up of individuals, and 9.90% had someone living alone who was 65 years of age or older. The average household size was 2.50 and the average family size was 2.97.

In the county, the population was spread out, with 23.40% under the age of 18, 5.80% from 18 to 24, 29.10% from 25 to 44, 27.10% from 45 to 64, and 14.60% who were 65 years of age or older. The median age was 41 years. For every 100 females, there were 98.00 males. For every 100 females age 18 and over, there were 96.60 males.

The median income for a household in the county was $51,601, and the median income for a family was $59,750. Males had a median income of $40,254 versus $30,165 for females. The per capita income for the county was $24,844. About 4.20% of families and 6.60% of the population were below the poverty line, including 7.10% of those under age 18 and 11.10% of those age 65 or over.

== Transportation ==
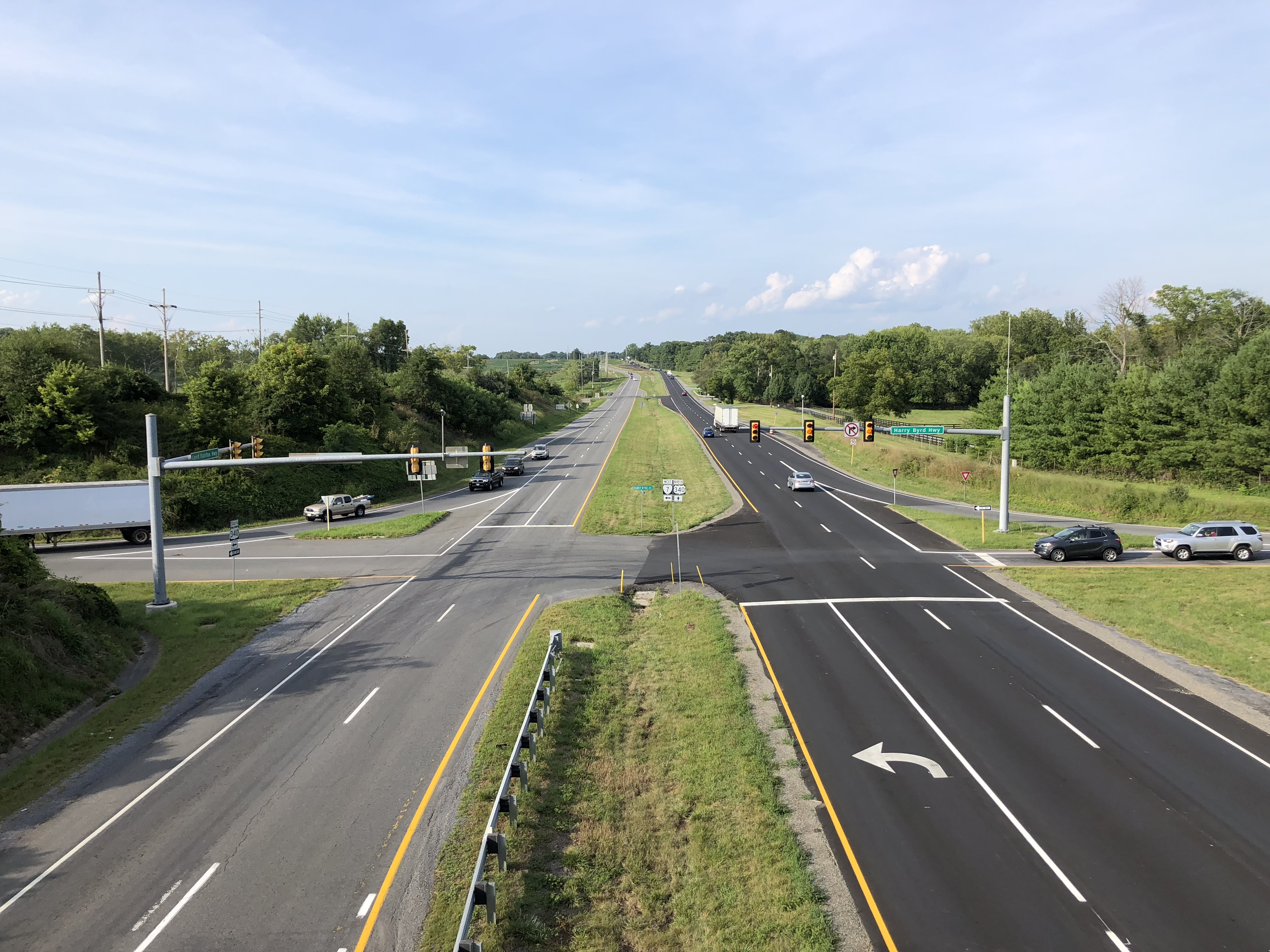
US 340 near Berryville in Clarke County

=== Major highways ===
- SR 7
- US 17
- US 50
- US 340
- SR 277

The Norfolk Southern Railway's H-Line runs the perimeter of Clarke County.

== Service ==
- Handley Regional Library System

== Communities ==
=== Towns ===
- Berryville
- Boyce

=== Census-designated place ===
- Shenandoah Retreat

=== Other unincorporated communities ===
- Berrys
- Bethel
- Briggs
- Care Free Acres
- Castlemans Ferry
- Double Tollgate
- Frogtown
- Gaylord
- Greenway Court
- Lewisville
- Millwood
- Pigeon Hill
- Pine Grove
- Saratoga
- Swimley
- Wadesville
- Waterloo
- Webbtown
- White Post
- Wickliffe

== Gallery ==
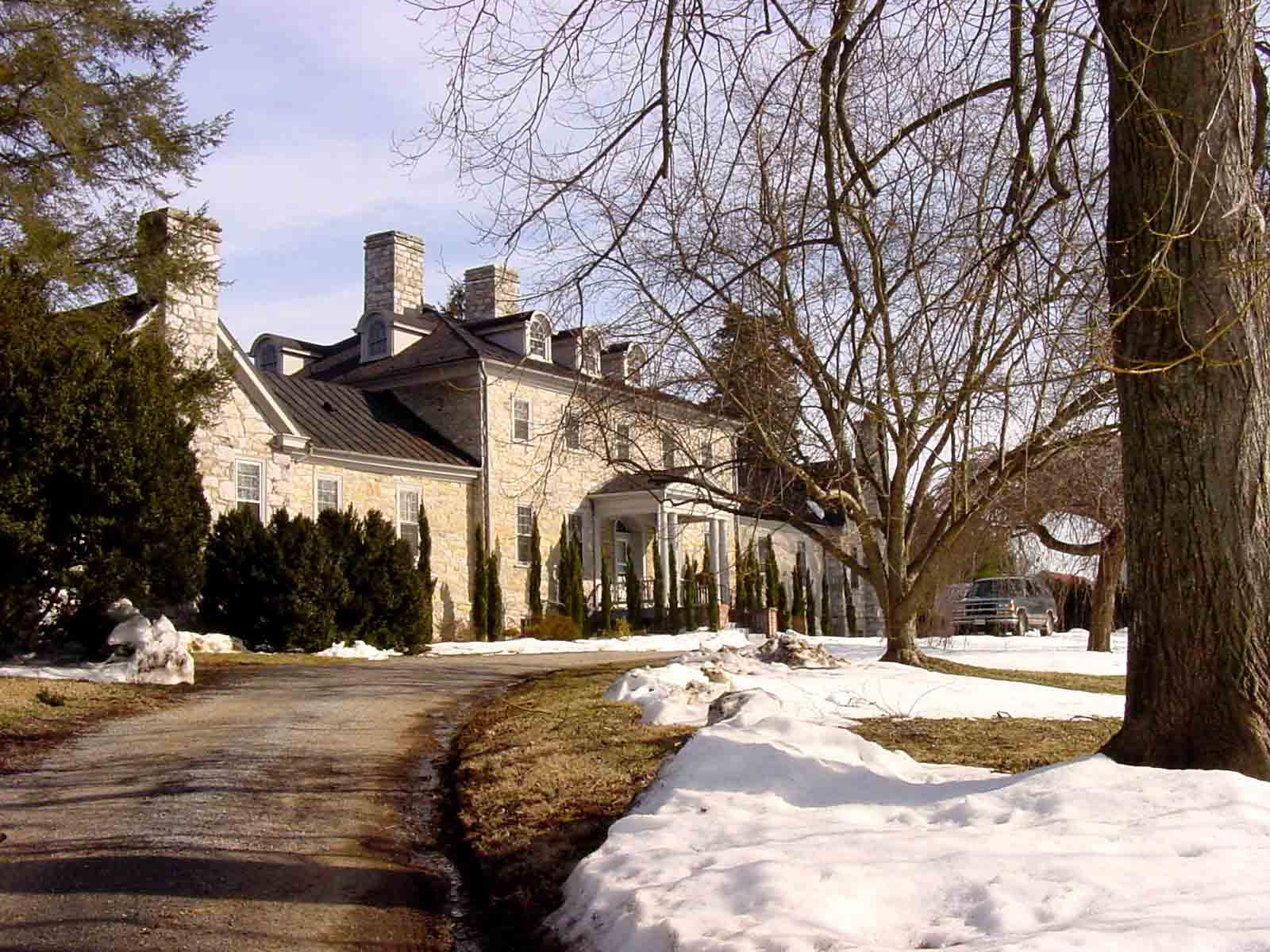
Fairfield Estate (1765)

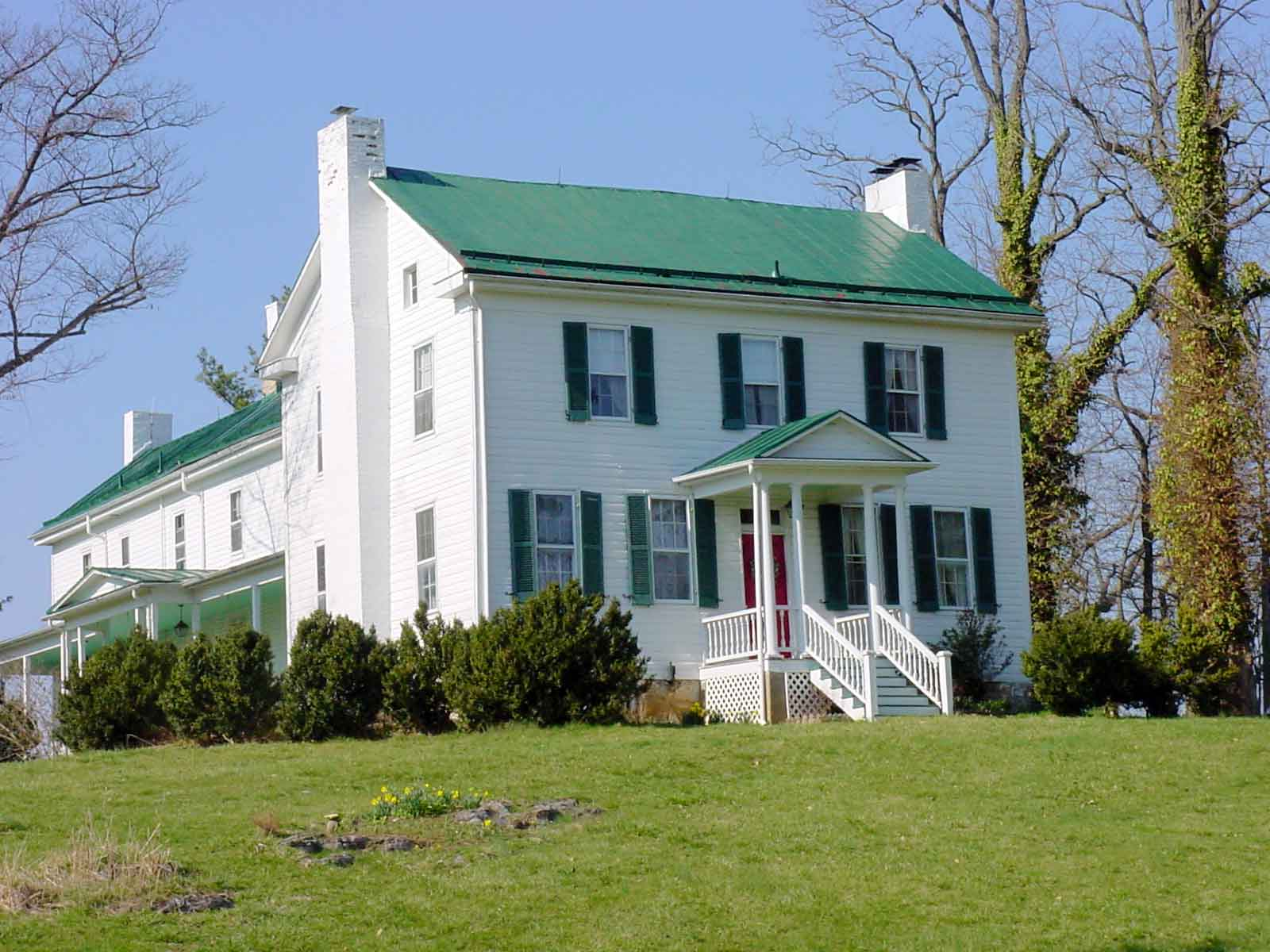
Soldier's Rest (1769)

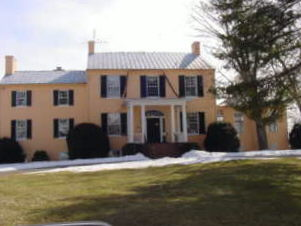
Norwood Estate (1780)

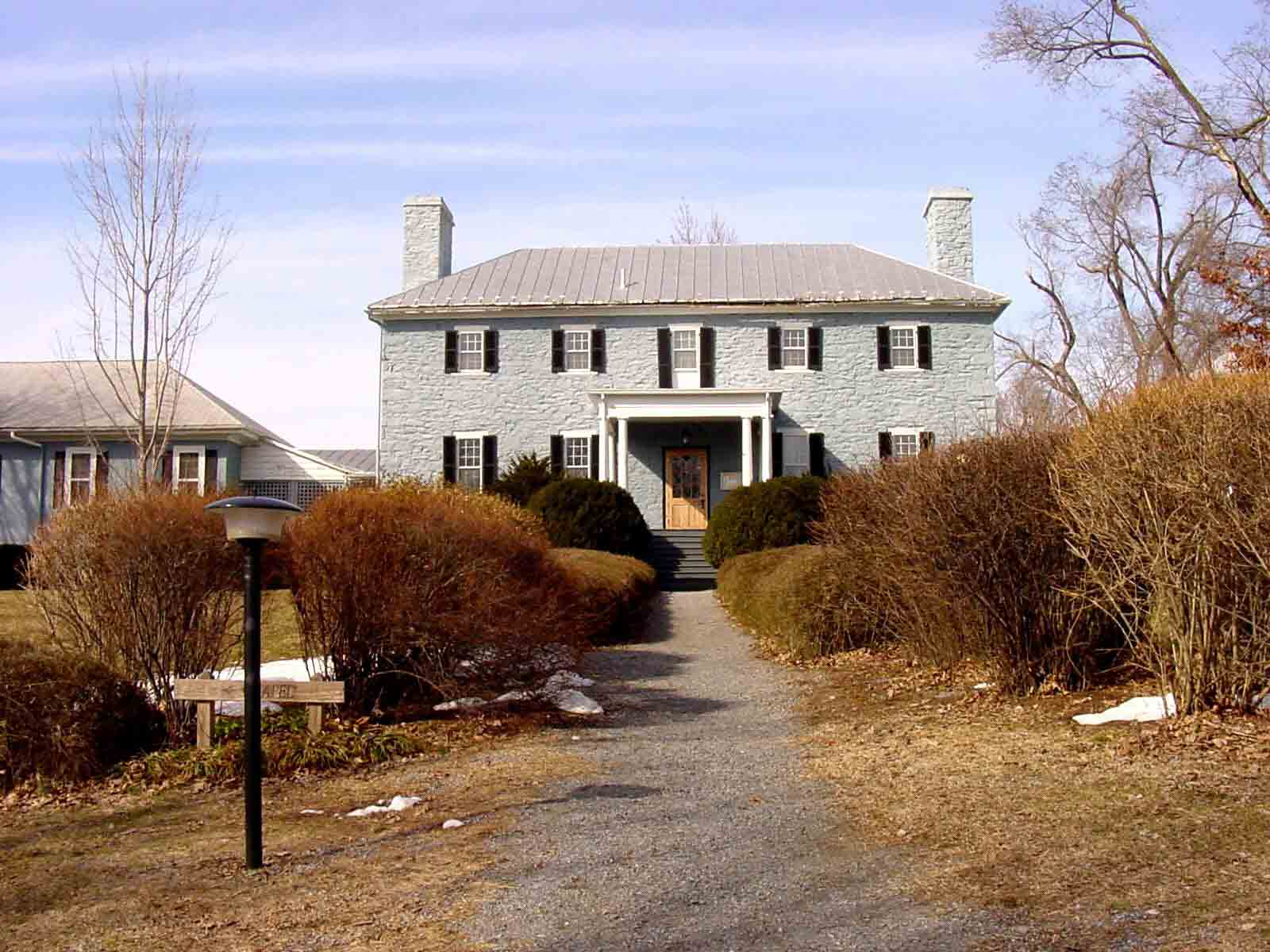
Holy Cross Abbey (1784)

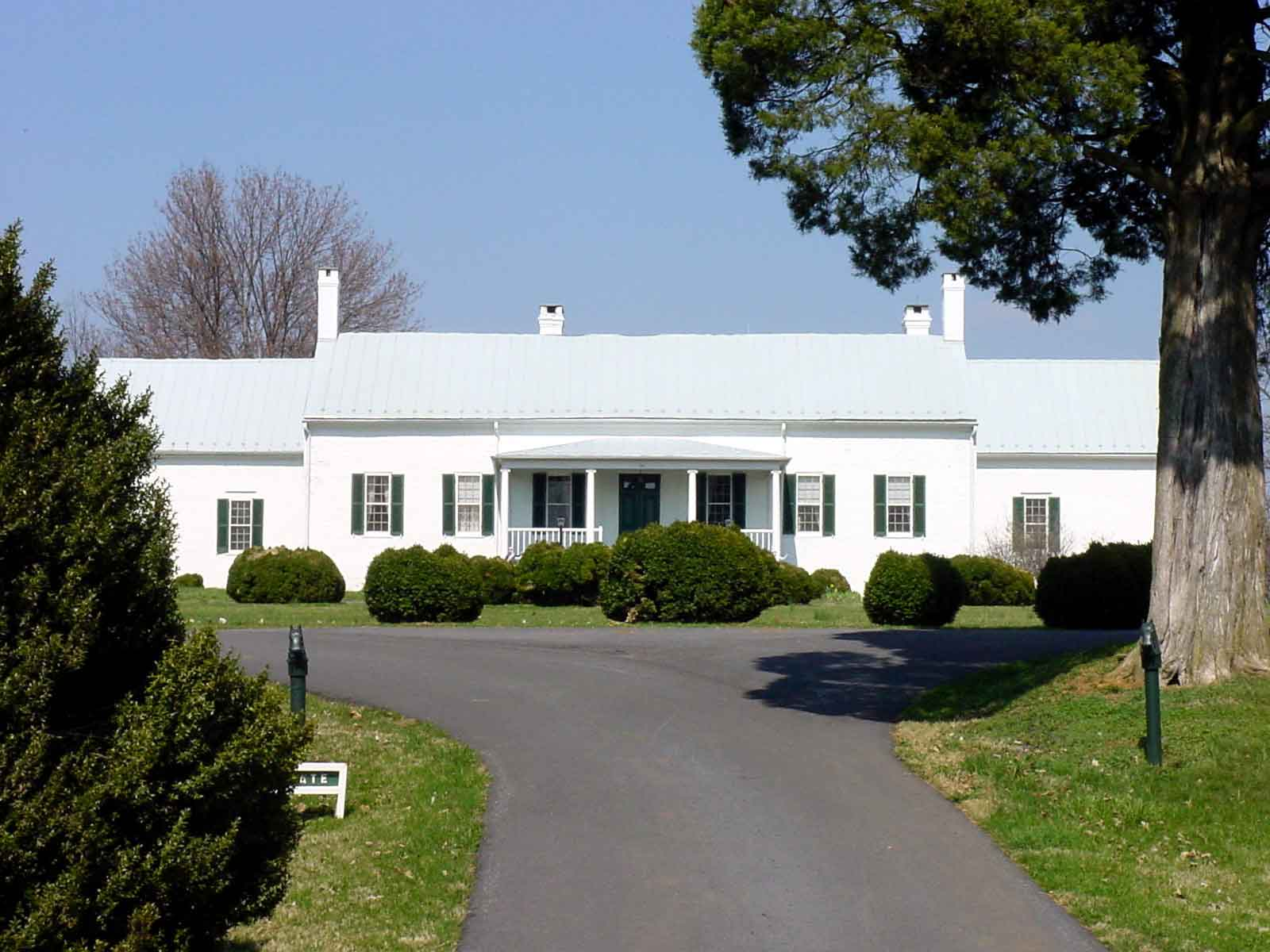
Audley Estate (1794)

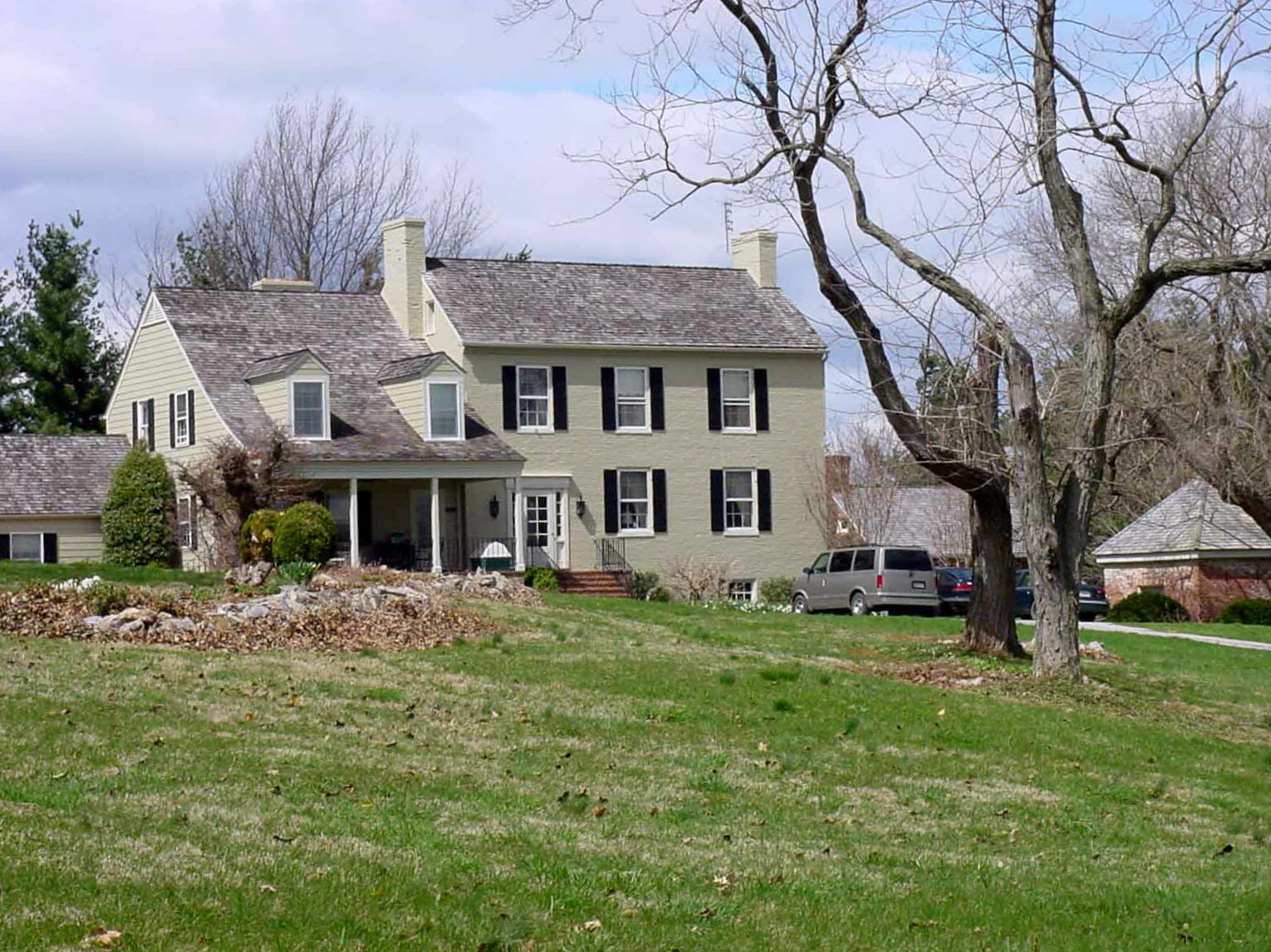
Bel Voi (1803)

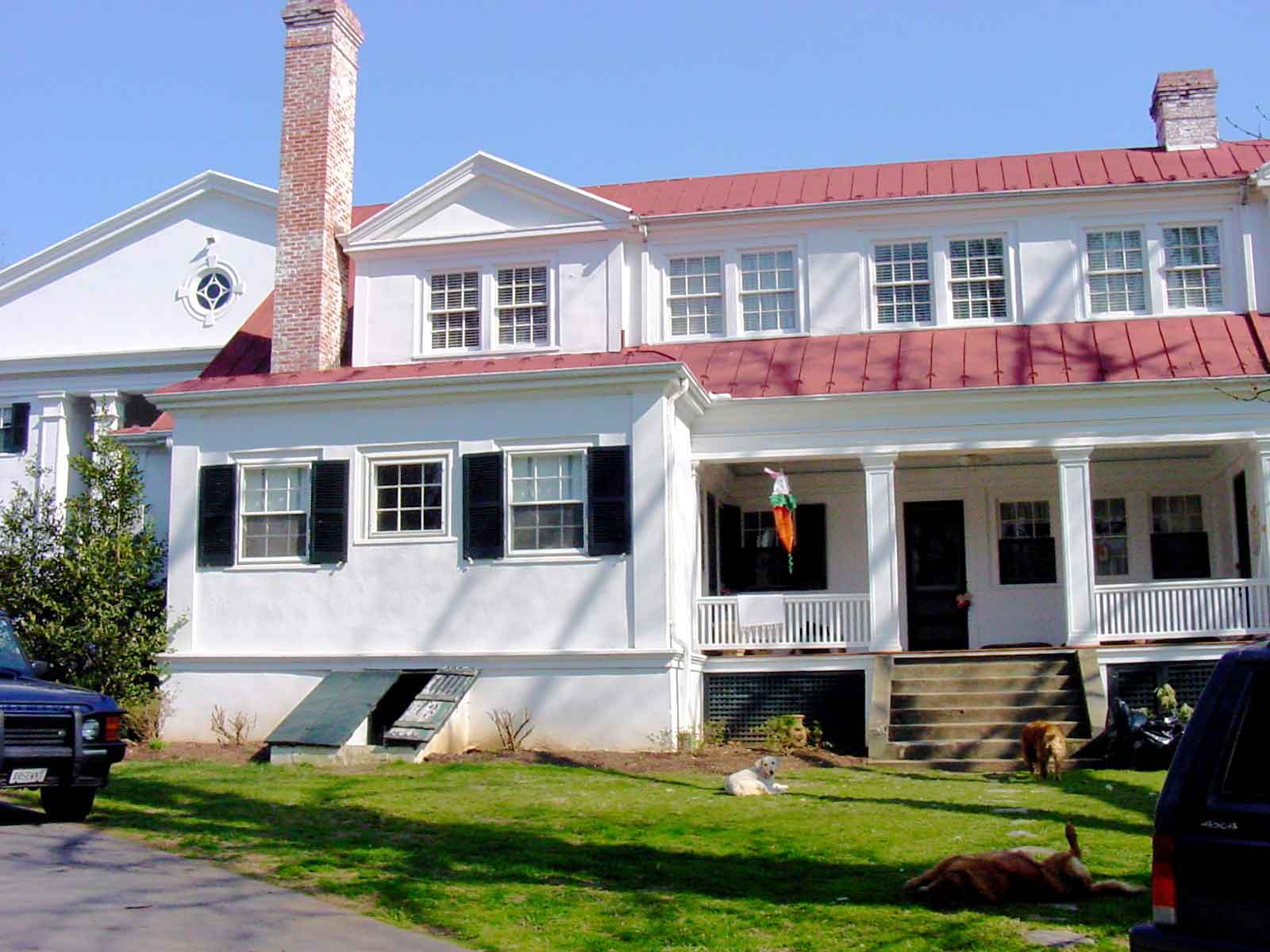
Rosemont Estate (1811)

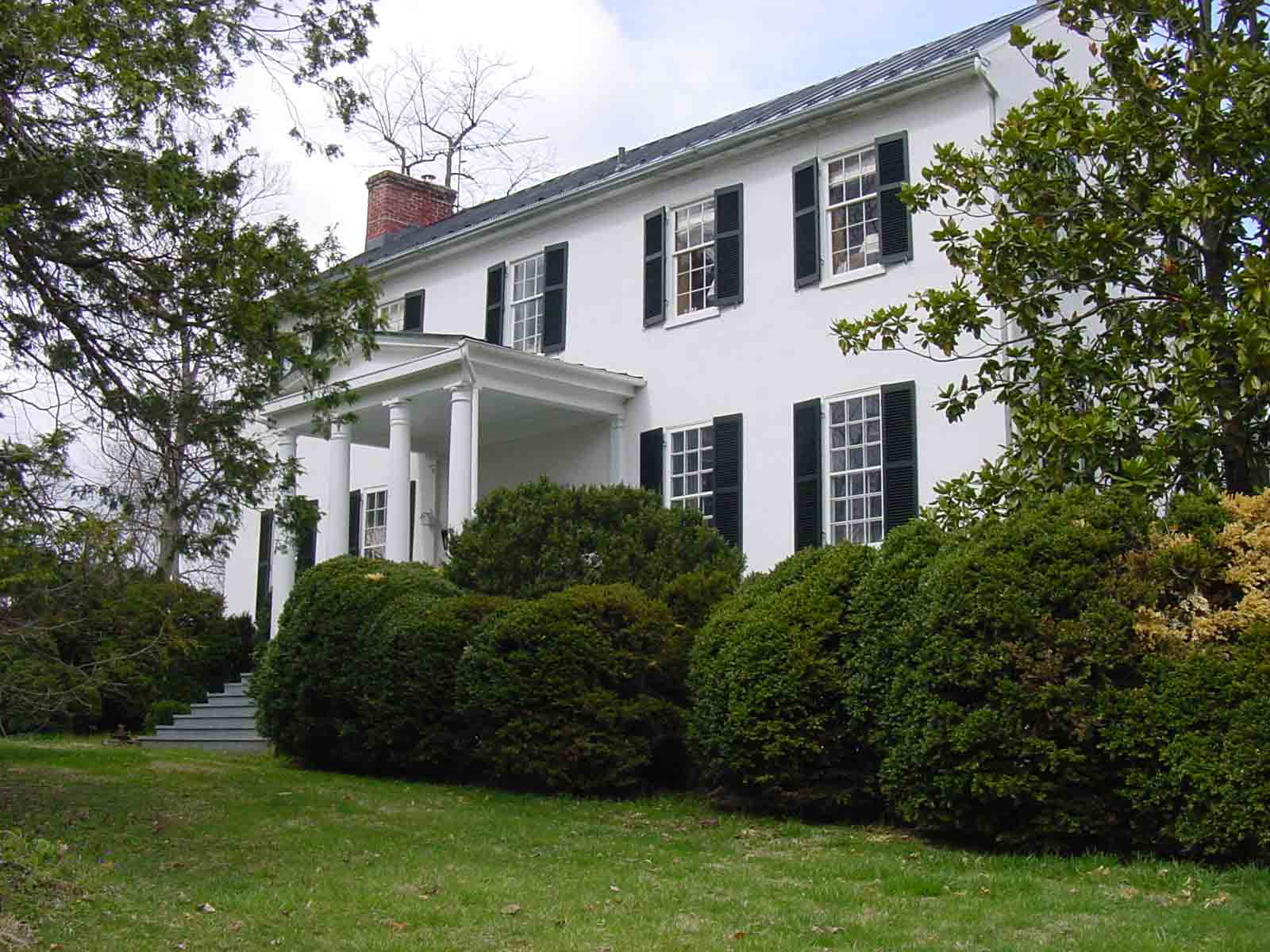
Clay Hill (1816)

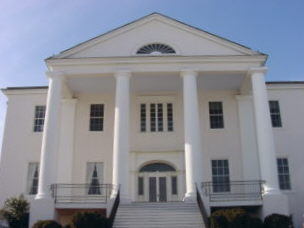
Clifton (1833)

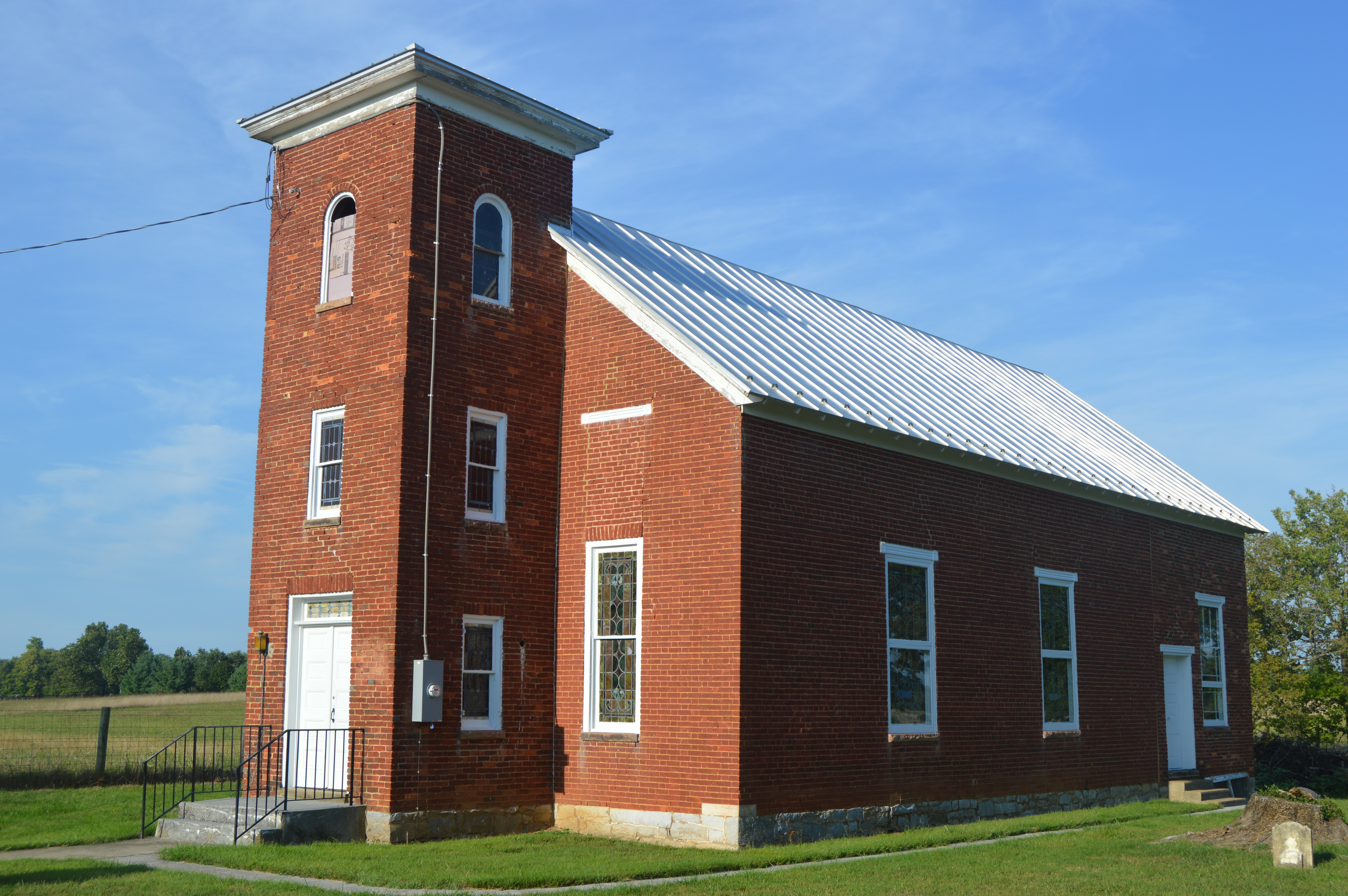
Stone's Chapel (1848)

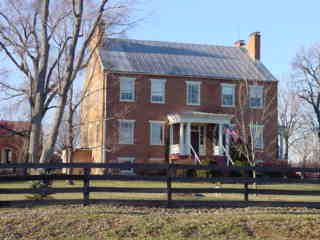
Glendale Farm (1850)

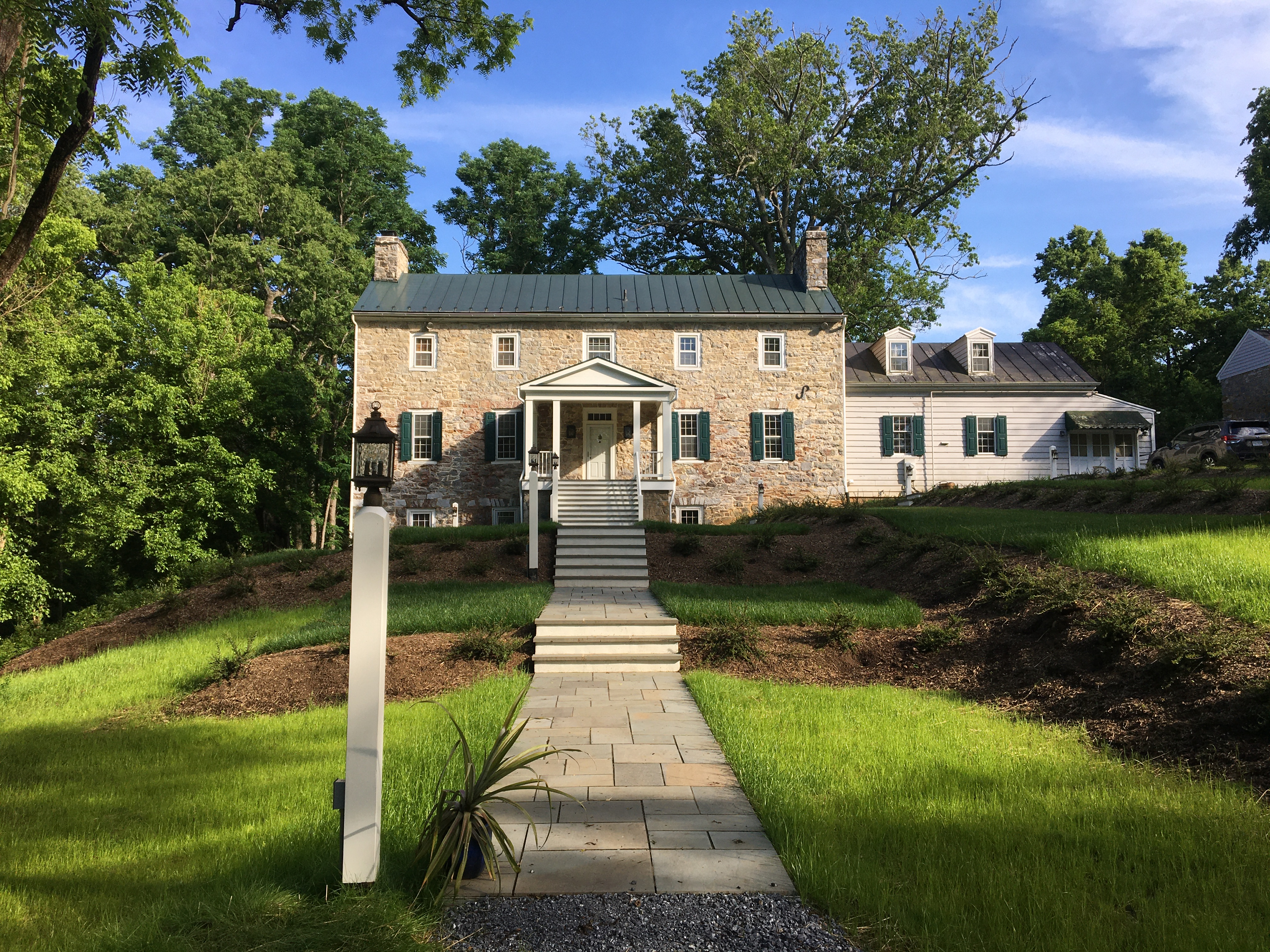
The River House (c. 1790)

== See also ==
- National Register of Historic Places listings in Clarke County, Virginia
