= Michael F. Urbanski =

American federal judge (born 1956)

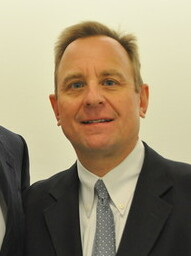
- Urbanski in 2011

Senior Judge of the United States District Court for the Western District of Virginia
- Incumbent
- Assumed office July 4, 2024

Chief Judge of the United States District Court for the Western District of Virginia
- In office July 3, 2017 – July 4, 2024
- Preceded by: Glen E. Conrad
- Succeeded by: Elizabeth K. Dillon

Judge of the United States District Court for the Western District of Virginia
- In office May 13, 2011 – July 4, 2024
- Appointed by: Barack Obama
- Preceded by: Norman K. Moon
- Succeeded by: Jasmine H. Yoon

Magistrate Judge of the United States District Court for the Western District of Virginia
- In office 2004 – May 13, 2011

Personal details
- Born: Michael Francis Urbanski; 1956 (age 69–70) Livorno, Italy
- Education: College of William & Mary (AB); University of Virginia (JD)

Michael Francis Urbanski (born 1956) is an American lawyer and jurist serving as a senior U.S. district judge of the United States District Court for the Western District of Virginia. He was appointed in 2011 by President Barack Obama. He previously served as a United States magistrate judge of the same court.

== Early life and education ==
Born in Livorno, Italy, where his father was stationed in the U.S. Army, Urbanski attended Denbigh High School in Newport News, Virginia. Urbanski earned an Artium Baccalaureus degree in 1978 from The College of William & Mary and a Juris Doctor in 1981 from the University of Virginia School of Law.

From 1981 until 1982, Urbanski served as a law clerk to Judge James Clinton Turk of the United States District Court for the Western District of Virginia.

== Career ==
From 1982 until 1984, Urbanski served as an associate in Washington, D.C. for the law firm Vinson & Elkins. From 1984 until 2004, practiced with the Woods Rogers law firm in Roanoke, Virginia, serving first as an associate from 1984 until 1988, and then as a principal from 1989 until 2004.

=== Federal judicial service ===
In 2004, Urbanski was selected by the judges on the United States District Court for the Western District of Virginia to be a United States magistrate judge.

On December 1, 2010, President Barack Obama nominated Urbanski to a vacant seat on the United States District Court for the Western District of Virginia that had been created by the decision by Judge Norman K. Moon to assume senior status in July 2010. The Senate Judiciary Committee reported Urbanski's nomination out of committee on March 10, 2011. The United States Senate confirmed him on May 12, 2011 by a 94–0 vote. He received his judicial commission on May 13, 2011. He became chief judge on July 3, 2017 and served until July 4, 2024.

In July 2023, Urbanski gave a one-year notice that he would be taking senior status. Virginia's senators recommended Jasmine Yoon for Urbanski's position, and President Joe Biden nominated her in January 2024. She was confirmed in March 2024. Urbanski assumed senior status on July 4, 2024.

Legal offices
Preceded by Norman K. Moon	Judge of the United States District Court for the Western District of Virginia; 2011–2024	Succeeded by Jasmine H. Yoon
Preceded by Glen E. Conrad	Chief Judge of the United States District Court for the Western District of Virginia; 2017–2024	Succeeded by Elizabeth K. Dillon
