= Thomas J. Michie =

American judge

Judge of the United States District Court for the Western District of Virginia
- In office June 30, 1961 – April 9, 1973
- Appointed by: John F. Kennedy
- Preceded by: Roby C. Thompson
- Succeeded by: Seat abolished pursuant to 71 Stat. 586

Mayor of Charlottesville, Virginia
- In office September 1, 1958 – August 31, 1960
- Preceded by: Jack Davis
- Succeeded by: Louie Scribner

Personal details
- Born: Thomas Johnson Michie; June 7, 1896 Northport, New York, U.S.
- Died: April 9, 1973 (aged 76)
- Education: University of Virginia (AB, AM, LLB)

Thomas Johnson Michie (June 7, 1896 – April 9, 1973) was an American attorney and United States district judge of the United States District Court for the Western District of Virginia.

== Education and career ==
Born on June 7, 1896, in Northport, New York, Michie was the son and nephew of the founders of The Michie Company, a lawbook publisher based in Charlottesville, Virginia. Michie received an Artium Baccalaureus degree in 1917 from the University of Virginia, an Artium Magister degree in 1920 from the same institution and a Bachelor of Laws in 1921 from the University of Virginia School of Law. He was a United States Army Second Lieutenant from 1917 to 1919.

Michie entered private practice in Charlottesville from 1921 to 1926. He was an attorney for the Koppers Company in Pittsburgh, Pennsylvania from 1926 to 1942, serving as chief counsel from 1937 to 1942. He was a United States Army Air Corps Lieutenant Colonel from 1942 to 1946. He returned to private practice in Charlottesville from 1946 to 1961, also serving as a Lecturer at the University of Virginia School of Law during the same period. The law firm he founded during this period remains in existence. He was the Mayor of Charlottesville from 1958 to 1960. As Mayor, Michie counseled the white citizens of Charlottesville to accept desegregation "as good citizens should." Michie was "a strong, strong leader in trying to work out an acceptable pattern of integration."

=== Family ===
Michie's son, Thomas J. Michie Jr. (D) served in the Virginia House of Delegates from 1971 to 1980 and then as state senator from 1980 to 1992. In 1942, Michie published a history of his family, The Michies, going back to a Scottish immigrant, known as "Scotch John" Michie.

== Federal judicial service ==
Michie was nominated by President John F. Kennedy on May 11, 1961, to a seat on the United States District Court for the Western District of Virginia vacated by Judge Roby C. Thompson. He was confirmed by the United States Senate on June 27, 1961, and received his commission on June 30, 1961. On November 6, 1967, President Lyndon B. Johnson certified Michie involuntarily as disabled in accordance with the act of September 2, 1957, 71 Stat. 586, which entitled the president to appoint an additional judge for the court and provided that no successor to the judge certified as disabled be appointed. Hiram Emory Widener Jr. was appointed to the additional judgeship. Michie remained in active status and continued to render a reduced level of service. His service terminated on April 9, 1973, due to his death. Due to the provisions of 71 Stat. 586, Michie's seat was abolished upon his death.

=== Notable cases and practices ===
In 1963, Michie began the tradition of conducting naturalization ceremonies at Monticello on Independence Day. Michie was a member of the Board of Trustees of the Thomas Jefferson Memorial Foundation, owner of Monticello.

Along with his colleagues, including Judges Ted Dalton and John Paul, Michie implemented the decision of the Supreme Court in Brown v. Board of Education in Western Virginia. In 1961, Michie ordered the admission of black students to the high school in Lynchburg, Virginia. In 1965, Michie ruled that the school board of Giles County, Virginia violated the Fourteenth Amendment by the dismissal of all of its African-American teachers in the course of integrating its school system. In connection with the civil rights demonstrations in Danville, Virginia in 1963, Michie chose to abstain from exercising jurisdiction over a petition filed by William Kunstler to obtain a federal court injunction against the criminal prosecution of the demonstrators.

Legal offices
Preceded by Roby C. Thompson	Judge of the United States District Court for the Western District of Virginia; 1961–1973	Succeeded by Seat abolished
