= Judge Barksdale =

Judge Barksdale may refer to:

- Alfred D. Barksdale (1892–1972), Virginia state court judge and judge of the United States District Court for the Western District of Virginia
- Rhesa Barksdale (born 1944), judge of the United States Court of Appeals for the Fifth Circuit
