= John P. Fishwick Jr. =

American attorney (b. 1957)

John Fishwick
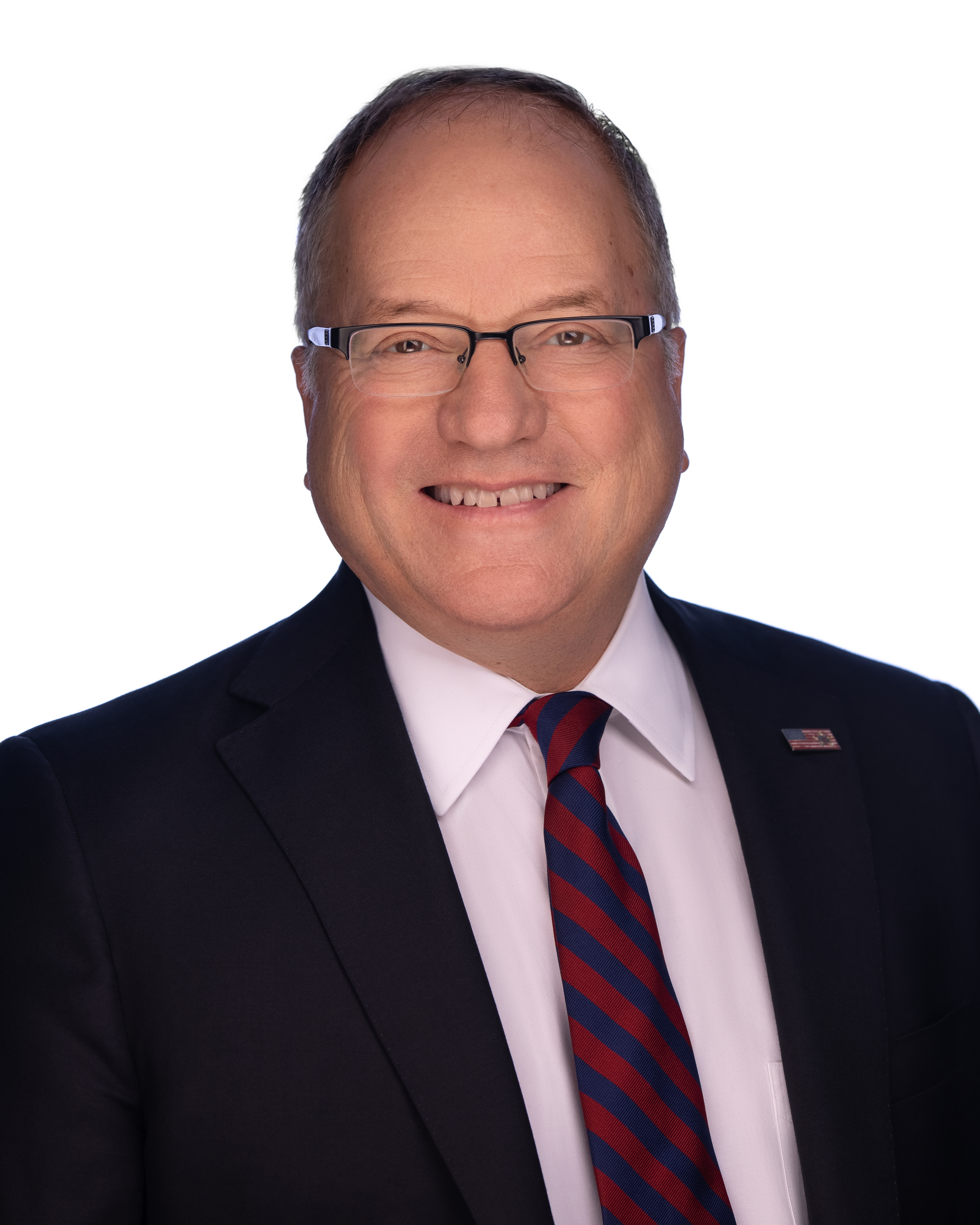

United States Attorney for the Western District of Virginia
- In office December 21, 2015 – January 6, 2017
- Appointed by: Barack Obama
- Preceded by: Timothy J. Heaphy
- Succeeded by: Thomas T. Cullen

Personal details
- Born: John Palmer Fishwick Jr. March 31, 1957 (age 69) Roanoke, Virginia, U.S.
- Party: Democratic
- Education: Harvard University (BA); Washington and Lee University (JD)
- Occupation: Attorney

John Palmer Fishwick Jr. (born March 31, 1957) is an attorney in Roanoke, Virginia who was United States Attorney for the Western District of Virginia between 2015 and 2017.

== Early life and education ==
Fishwick was born in Roanoke, Virginia in 1957. His father, John Fishwick Sr., was a railroad executive and community leader in Roanoke.

Fishwick graduated from Harvard University in 1979 and received his Juris Doctor from the Washington and Lee University School of Law in 1983.

== Professional career ==
Following law school graduation, Fishwick worked as a law clerk for James Clinton Turk, then Chief Judge of the United States District Court for the Western District of Virginia. Prior to becoming a United States Attorney, John was in private practice in Roanoke, Virginia where he tried personal injury and federal criminal cases.

In October 2015, Fishwick was one of President Barack Obama's six nominees to United States Attorney posts. Fishwick was confirmed unanimously by the Senate Judicial Committee and was sworn in as the U.S. Attorney for the Western Virginia District in December 2015. Fishwick focused his efforts on prosecuting violent criminals and countering the growing heroin epidemic. He resigned on January 6, 2017.

Fishwick returned to private practice at his newly created firm, Fishwick & Associates in Roanoke. He led the effort to have stockholders mandate an annual physical for the CEO of CSX Transportation.

== Civic activities ==
In 2018, Fishwick led the efforts to rename tennis courts in Roanoke after Carnis Poindexter, an African-American tennis player from Roanoke. In 2022, he led a successful campaign to rename Roanoke's federal courthouse building after Reuben E. Lawson, a civil rights lawyer.
