= E. Duncan Getchell =

American lawyer

Earle Duncan Getchell, Jr. (born October 12, 1949 in Mobile, Alabama, and died May 1, 2024 in Richmond, Virginia) was an American lawyer and a former nominee to the United States Court of Appeals for the Fourth Circuit. He was the Solicitor General of Virginia in the Administration of Kenneth T. Cuccinelli, II, Attorney General of Virginia from 2010 through 2014, and also served as Deputy Counselor to Virginia Governor Glenn Youngkin until his death in May of 2024. In 2007, President George W. Bush nominated Getchell to the Fourth Circuit, but he withdrew his nomination in 2008 after it did not receive a hearing.

== Background ==
Getchell attended Emory University on an Air Force ROTC Scholarship and graduated with high honors. He then graduated with distinction from Duke University Law School, where he was on the staff and editorial board of the Duke Law Journal.

After law school, Mr. Getchell worked as an associate at McGuire, Woods & Battle for one year before serving as an Air Force JAG Officer in the Office of the General Counsel for two years, attaining the rank of captain. He served in the U.S. Air Force Reserve 1971–1977, with active duty assignment 1975–1977. After his tenure with the Air Force, Mr. Getchell returned to McGuire, Woods & Battle in 1977 and remained there for over thirty years. He was made a partner in 1981 and then headed the firm's appellate litigation. Mr. Getchell is a fellow of the American Academy of Appellate Lawyers, an elected member of The American Law Institute, and a permanent member of the Fourth Circuit Judicial Conference.

In late 2009, Virginia Attorney General Ken Cuccinelli named him Solicitor General of Virginia. In 2014, Mr. Getchell returned to practice at McGuireWoods LLP. In 2021, Mr. Getchell retired from private practice and shortly thereafter was appointed Deputy Counselor to the Governor by then Governor-elect Glenn Youngkin.

== Fourth Circuit nomination ==
On September 6, 2007, President George W. Bush nominated Getchell to a seat on the United States Court of Appeals for the Fourth Circuit vacated by Judge H. Emory Widener, Jr., who had taken senior status on July 17, 2007. From September 2003 until January 2007, William J. Haynes, II had been nominated for the position, but his nomination had met stiff opposition from Senate Democrats over his role as general counsel of the United States Department of Defense in the formulation of rules concerning the use of torture in Iraq. Getchell was nominated as Haynes' replacement.

In 2006, Virginia’s two U.S. Senators at the time – John Warner and George Allen, both Republicans – had recommended three candidates from Virginia for two open seats on the Fourth Circuit Court of Appeals. Getchell was on that list. But before Bush acted, Allen was defeated for re-election by Democrat Jim Webb. In July 2007, Warner and Webb submitted a new list of five names, and Getchell was not on it. Bush nominated Getchell anyway, noting that he was rated “highly qualified” by the Virginia State Bar. Warner and Webb did not support him, so his nomination never received a hearing.

Getchell withdrew his nomination from consideration on January 23, 2008. On May 8, 2008, Judge Glen E. Conrad was nominated instead, but his nomination expired at the end of Bush's term.

== See also ==
- George W. Bush judicial appointment controversies

== Sources ==
- Official Justice Department Resume
- Official White House Biography
- Biography from McGuireWoods
- Alliance for Justice Report on E. Duncan Getchell
