= Judge Conrad =

Judge Conrad may refer to:

- Glen E. Conrad (1949–2021), judge of the United States District Court for the Western District of Virginia
- Robert J. Conrad (born 1958), judge of the United States District Court for the Western District of North Carolina
