= Floyd H. Roberts =

American judge

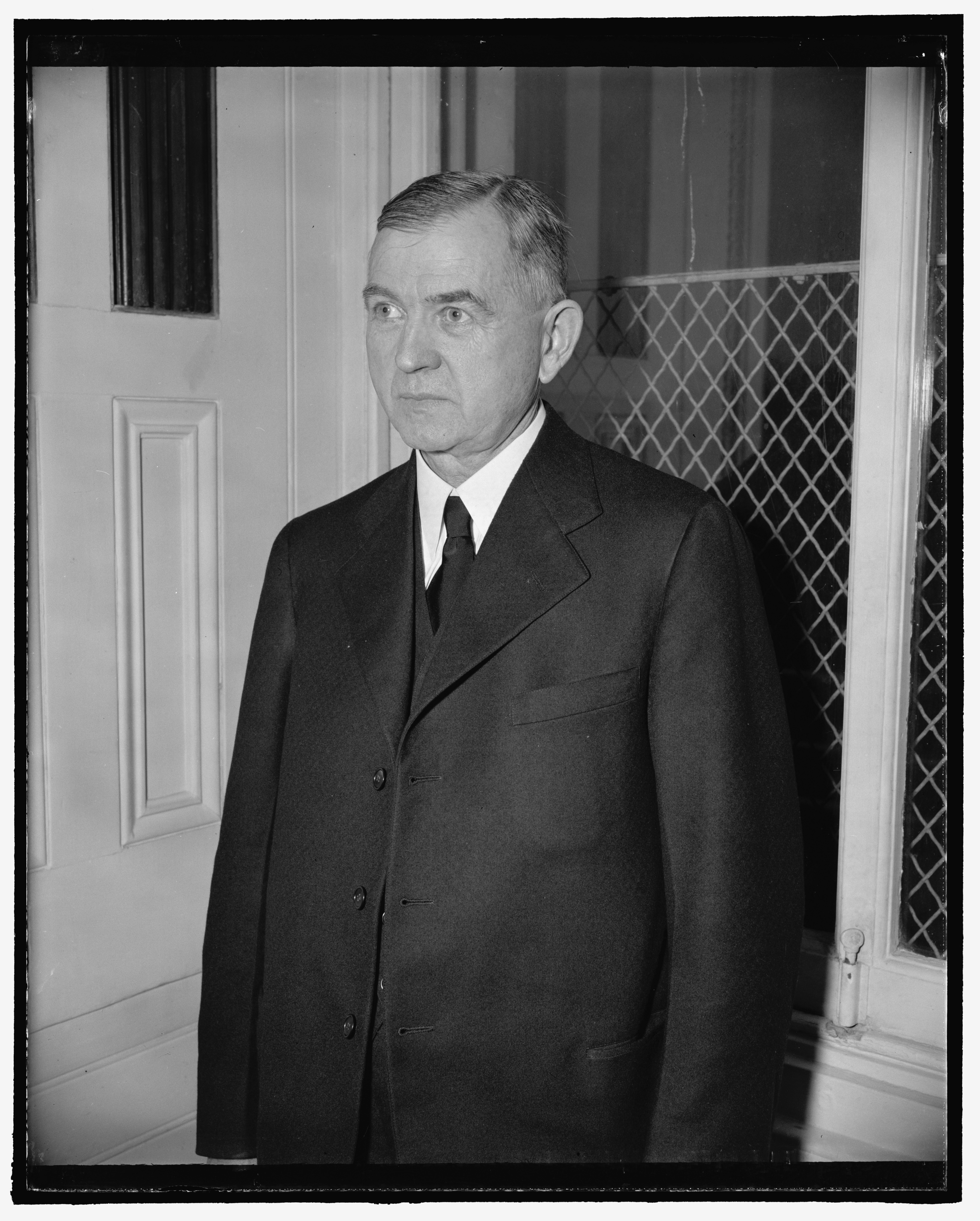

Judge of the United States District Court for the Western District of Virginia
- In office July 6, 1938 – February 6, 1939
- Appointed by: Franklin D. Roosevelt
- Preceded by: Seat established by 52 Stat. 584
- Succeeded by: Armistead Mason Dobie

Personal details
- Born: Floyd Hurt Roberts; March 29, 1879 Bristol, Virginia
- Died: January 29, 1967 (aged 87)
- Education: University of Virginia School of Law

Floyd Hurt Roberts (March 29, 1879 – January 29, 1967) was a United States district judge of the United States District Court for the Western District of Virginia.

== Education and career ==
Born on March 29, 1879, in Bristol, Virginia, Roberts attended the University of Virginia School of Law. He entered private practice in Bristol in 1904.

== Unsuccessful federal judicial nomination and recess appointment ==
Roberts received a recess appointment from President Franklin D. Roosevelt on July 6, 1938, to the United States District Court for the Western District of Virginia, to a new seat authorized by 52 Stat. 584. He was nominated to the same position by President Roosevelt on January 5, 1939. His service terminated on February 6, 1939, due to his resignation, after his nomination was rejected by the United States Senate that same day. He would otherwise have been eligible to continue serving until August 5, 1939, the day the first session of the 76th United States Congress adjourned.

=== Circumstances of his nomination ===
Roosevelt reportedly "made the decision to nominate Roberts in order to discipline" Virginia's senators, Harry F. Byrd and Carter Glass "for their consistent opposition to the New Deal and in an effort to assure a friendly Virginia delegation to the 1940 Democratic convention." In the "broader political context" of 1938, Roosevelt tried to oppose the renomination of Democrats who opposed his New Deal. The timing of the Roberts' nomination corresponded with Roosevelt's efforts across the board to reassert his authority over Democratic legislators. At stake were not only the immediate prospects for Roosevelt's legislative agenda, but also the prospect of a future struggle over the presidential nomination in 1940, as Roosevelt sought to use federal patronage to woo Democratic supporters away from Democratic opponents of the New Deal, in Virginia and elsewhere.

Roberts had the support of Congressman John W. Flannagan Jr., but both Virginia senators, Harry F. Byrd and Carter Glass, disapproved of Roberts' selection. They preferred another state court judge, A.C. Buchanan, or Assistant United States Attorney Frank S. Tavenner Jr., among others seeking the position. Months prior, Roosevelt had debated about who should have "veto power" over federal appointments in Virginia, suggesting that newly elected Governor James H. Price should have that power rather than the United States senators. Charles J. Harkrader, a member of the Senate of Virginia and publisher of the Bristol Herald Courier made this White House discussion public in March 1938. When Senator Glass objected that he had not been consulted over Roberts' selection, Roosevelt responded "that he was happy to consult Glass, but reserved the right to consult others, including, if he wished, 'Nancy Astor, the Duchess of Windsor, the WPA, a Virginia moonshiner, Governor Price or Charlie McCarthy.'"

Virginian R. Walton Moore, a former congressman and president of the Virginia Bar Association, then serving as counselor in the State Department, "led the administration's effort to secure" the Roberts nomination, but Moore badly underestimated the vigor of Glass and Byrd's opposition. Senator Glass, in his remarks before the Senate, declared that the Roberts nomination was "personally obnoxious" to him, invoking the magic words that guaranteed the confirmation's denial. At Roberts' confirmation hearing, witnesses testifying to his qualifications included Governor Price, former Governors Westmoreland Davis and E. Lee Trinkle, and the head of the Virginia Bar Association. The Judiciary Committee recommended against confirming Roberts, by vote of 14—3, "on the grounds that his nomination was 'personally offensive' to the two Virginia Senators." The Senate vote against Roberts was 72—9, with Harry S. Truman among other Democrats siding with Glass and against Roosevelt. Commenting on Roosevelt's position, Senator Glass declared: "Ninety-six Senators have the right of veto over Presidential nominations in specified cases, and on last Monday seventy-two of them exercised their right of veto on the President's nominee for Judge of the Western District of Virginia."

As of February 6, 1939, the day of the Senate vote, "Judge Roberts was now out of a job, and the administration was seen as having suffered a stunning political defeat." The day after the Senate vote, Roosevelt wrote and made public a lengthy letter to Roberts, declaring his thanks for "the honorable, efficient, and in every way praiseworthy service that you have rendered to the people of the United States in general and to the people of the Western District of Virginia in particular" and that "not one single person who has opposed your confirmation has lifted his voice in any shape, manner or form against your personal integrity and ability."

Commenting on who might be nominated after Roberts by Roosevelt, Senator Glass predicted: "I think he'll send up a more objectionable one – if he can find it." Roosevelt solved the problem of filling the judgeship by naming the dean of the University of Virginia Law School, Armistead Mason Dobie, then state court judge Alfred D. Barksdale, to the position. Roberts returned to private practice in Bristol, and litigated cases as counsel before his successors as judge in both state and federal court.

== Death and legacy ==
Roberts died on January 27, 1967. His wife also died by the end of the year. They are buried in Bristol's Mountain View Cemetery. A portrait of Judge Roberts hangs in the courtroom of the Circuit Court for the City of Bristol.

== Sources ==
Legal offices
Preceded by Seat established by 52 Stat. 584	Judge of the United States District Court for the Western District of Virginia; 1938–1939	Succeeded by Armistead Mason Dobie
