= Glen Morgan Williams =

American judge (1920–2012)

Senior Judge of the United States District Court for the Western District of Virginia
- In office November 21, 1988 – November 4, 2012

Judge of the United States District Court for the Western District of Virginia
- In office September 17, 1976 – November 21, 1988
- Appointed by: Gerald Ford
- Preceded by: Ted Dalton
- Succeeded by: Samuel Grayson Wilson

Magistrate Judge of the United States District Court for the Western District of Virginia
- In office 1968–1975

Member of the Virginia Senate from the 16th district
- In office January 13, 1954 – January 11, 1956
- Preceded by: J. Marion Smith
- Succeeded by: Roy V. Wolfe Jr.

Personal details
- Born: February 17, 1920 Jonesville, Virginia, U.S.
- Died: November 4, 2012 (aged 92) Johnson City, Tennessee, U.S.
- Party: Republican
- Spouse(s): Betty Calton; Jane Slemp
- Children: 4, including Judith Jagdmann
- Education: Milligan College (AB); University of Virginia (JD)

Military service
- Allegiance: United States
- Branch/service: United States Navy
- Years of service: 1942–1946
- Battles/wars: World War II

Glen Morgan Williams (February 17, 1920 – November 4, 2012) was a United States district judge of the United States District Court for the Western District of Virginia.

== Education and career ==
Born in Jonesville, Virginia, Williams received an Artium Baccalaureus degree from Milligan College in 1940, and enrolled in the fall of 1941 at the University of Virginia School of Law. After the outbreak of World War II, he enlisted in the United States Navy, having never seen the ocean. During his officer training, he was a roommate of Herman Wouk, who told of their experiences in the opening chapter of The Caine Mutiny. Williams was a Lieutenant in the United States Navy during World War II, from 1942 to 1946. After his discharge, he returned to law school and received a Juris Doctor from the University of Virginia School of Law in 1948. Before his graduation, he was elected Commonwealth's attorney of Lee County, Virginia in 1948, and served in that position until 1952. He was in private practice in Jonesville from 1952 to 1976. He was a member of the Virginia Senate from 1954 to 1956, elected to finish the term of J. Marion Smith, who died in office in 1953. Williams was a part-time United States magistrate judge for the United States District Court for the Western District of Virginia from 1963 to 1975. In 1964, Williams ran as the Republican nominee for Congress in Virginia's Ninth District but lost to the incumbent, W. Pat Jennings.

== Federal judicial service ==
Williams was a federal judge on the United States District Court for the Western District of Virginia. Williams was nominated by President Gerald Ford on September 8, 1976, to a seat on the United States District Court for the Western District of Virginia vacated by Judge Theodore Roosevelt Dalton, after Senator William L. Scott derailed the nomination of the President's first choice. He was confirmed by the United States Senate on September 17, 1976, and received his commission the same day. He assumed senior status on November 21, 1988. Williams took inactive senior status in February 2010.

=== Law clerks ===
Williams' former law clerks and interns include Cynthia D. Kinser, the first woman to serve as Chief Justice of the Supreme Court of Virginia; George Allen, who served as Governor of Virginia and a member of the United States Senate; Karen Gould, the first woman to serve as executive director of the Virginia State Bar; Virginia Circuit Court judges Randall Lowe, John Kilgore, Fred Rowlett, and Eric Theissen; United States Magistrate Judge Cynthia Eddy of the Western District of Pennsylvania; United States Bankruptcy Judge Trish Brown of the District of Oregon; and General District Court Judge Lucas Hobbs.

== Notable cases ==
Williams' most famous cases involved the coal mining industry. He wrote an opinion addressing the constitutionality of the Surface Mining Control and Reclamation Act of 1977. The Supreme Court agreed in part and disagreed in part with his conclusions. He dealt with the civil disobedience of the United Mine Workers of America in connection with the Pittston Coal strike in 1989–1990. He enjoined the members of the Bituminous Coal Operators Association to pay more for the health care of 100,000 retired and disabled miners, in a case that led to the passage of the Coal Act, 26 U.S.C. 9701, et seq.

== Death ==
Williams donated his papers to the Appalachian School of Law. He died November 4, 2012, at the age of 92, in Johnson City, Tennessee.

Legal offices
Preceded by Theodore Roosevelt Dalton	Judge of the United States District Court for the Western District of Virginia; 1976–1988	Succeeded by Samuel Grayson Wilson
