= Lloyd M. Robinette =

American politician

Member of the Virginia Senate from the 16th district
- In office January 13, 1932 – November 2, 1951
- Preceded by: Ryland G. Craft
- Succeeded by: J. Marion Smith

Personal details
- Born: Lloyd Mileham Robinette; March 26, 1881 Blackwater, Virginia, U.S.
- Died: November 2, 1951 (aged 70) Jonesville, Virginia, U.S.
- Party: Democratic
- Education: Roanoke College (AB); University of Virginia (LLB)
- Occupation: Lawyer; politician

Lloyd Mileham Robinette (March 26, 1881 – November 2, 1951) was a Virginia lawyer and politician. A Democrat, Robinette agreed with President Franklin D. Roosevelt's New Deal and was one of the leading opponents within Virginia of the powerful Byrd Organization, who U.S. Senator Harry F. Byrd called "anti's". Robinette represented his native Lee County, Virginia and adjacent Scott County for nearly two decades in the Virginia Senate, until his suicide days before the 1951 election.

== Early and family life ==
Lloyd Robinette was born in Blackwater, Virginia to Narcissa Lindsey Robinette (1850-1892), and her husband, former Confederate veteran Samuel R. Robinette (1839-1926). His father had served in Company B of the 25th Virginia Cavalry before being captured in 1864 and imprisoned in Indiana until the end of the American Civil War. Although his mother was born in Illinois, her family descended from Irish emigrants to Bedford County, Virginia centuries before; his parents met and married in Tennessee in 1870. His father's ancestors had been Huguenots who fled France to Bavaria, then England before emigrating to Pennsylvania and eventually southwestern Virginia. Lloyd Robinette was eligible for membership in the Sons of the American Revolution on both sides of his family, but instead chose to participate in the Sons of Confederate Veterans, eventually leading the William E. Jones Camp. His seven siblings included older brother Charles J. Robinette (1875-1925), younger brothers Lewis Emerson Robinette (1883-1946) and Amos Oscar Robinette (1891-1971), as well as sisters Mary Robinette (b. 1872), Sarah Caldona Robinette Livingston (1877-1918), Ida May Robinette (1885-1909) and Lilie B. Robinette (b. 1887).

Lloyd Robinette was educated in the public schools and Jonesville Academy before attending Roanoke College, where he was editor-in-chief of the Roanoke Collegian (among other journalistic and social endeavors) and received an A.B. degree in 1906. He then studied law at the University of Virginia School of Law, where he was a member of Phi Alpha Delta and his high grades earned membership in the Order of the Coif before he graduated with an LLB degree in 1909. Robinette never married.

== Career ==
Before completing his formal education, Robinette taught for five years in the local Lee County public schools. After graduating from law school and admission to the Virginia bar, Robinette remained in Charlottesville as an instructor in law from 1909-1911. He returned to Lee County and served as commissioner of accounts (probate) before voters elected him as Commonwealth Attorney (prosecutor), in which capacity he served from 1921 until 1924. He then returned to his private legal practice. Robinette was also active in the Masons, helped collect funds for the U.S. armed forces during both World Wars, and also served as chairman of the local Red Cross Chapter.

Lee and Scott County voters elected Robinette to the Virginia Senate in 1931, where he succeeded Republican Ryland G. Craft. He was re-elected to that part-time position numerous times. in 1947 he defeated Republican C.S. Pendleton with 92,11 votes to 8,375.

== Death and legacy ==
On Friday morning, November 2, 1951, Robinette died of a self-inflicted gunshot wound to the temple at his Jonesville home. Republican multi-term Virginia House delegate J. Marion Smith of Pennington Gap and Jonesville (whose many jobs included farmer and rancher, Lee County Clerk, Lee County Sun editor, North Fork Coal Company treasurer), succeeded him in the Virginia Senate, officially winning the election the following Tuesday with 10,383 votes to Robinette's 9,605.

Senate of Virginia
Preceded by Ryland G. Craft	Virginia Senator for 16th District (Lee and Scott Counties); 1932–1951	Succeeded by J. Marion Smith
