= Jackson L. Kiser =

American attorney and jurist (1929–2020)

Senior Judge of the United States District Court for the Western District of Virginia
- In office April 30, 1997 – October 21, 2020

Chief Judge of the United States District Court for the Western District of Virginia
- In office 1993–1997
- Preceded by: James Clinton Turk
- Succeeded by: Samuel Grayson Wilson

Judge of the United States District Court for the Western District of Virginia
- In office December 3, 1981 – April 30, 1997
- Appointed by: Ronald Reagan
- Preceded by: Seat established by 92 Stat. 1629
- Succeeded by: Norman K. Moon

Personal details
- Born: June 24, 1929 Welch, West Virginia, U.S.
- Died: October 21, 2020 (aged 91)
- Education: Concord College (BA); Washington & Lee University (LLB)

Jackson Lintecum Kiser (June 24, 1929 – October 21, 2020) was an American attorney and jurist who served as a United States district judge of the United States District Court for the Western District of Virginia.

== Early life and education ==
Born in Welch, West Virginia, Kiser earned a Bachelor of Arts degree from Concord College in 1951 and a Bachelor of Laws from Washington and Lee University School of Law in 1952.

== Career ==
He served as an attorney for the Judge Advocate General's Corps from 1952 to 1955. Afterward, he served as a captain in the United States Army Reserve from 1955 to 1961. Later, he was a United States commissioner for the United States District Court for the Western District of Virginia from 1956 to 1958. He then worked as an assistant United States Attorney of the Western District of Virginia from 1958 to 1961. He was in private practice in Martinsville, Virginia, from 1961 to 1982.

=== Federal judicial service ===
On November 4, 1981, President Ronald Reagan nominated Kiser to a new seat on the United States District Court for the Western District of Virginia created by 92 Stat. 1629. He was confirmed by the United States Senate on December 3, 1981, and received his commission the same day. He served as Chief Judge from 1993 to 1997. He assumed senior status on April 30, 1997, and relocated his chambers from Roanoke, Virginia to Danville, Virginia. Kiser died October 21, 2020, after a brief illness.

=== Notable cases ===
Over the course of his judicial career, Kiser heard and decided a number of highly important judicial questions. Most notably, he was the trial judge for two cases that eventually reached the United States Supreme Court: United States v. Virginia, in which the Supreme Court held Virginia Military Institute's male-only admissions policy unconstitutional, and United States v. Morrison, in which the High Court struck down portions of a federal law for exceeding the scope of Congress' authority under the Commerce Clause. In 2015, Judge Kiser dismissed a challenge to Virginia's effective ban on uranium mining, holding that Virginia's actions were not preempted by the Atomic Energy Act. That decision was affirmed by the United States Court of Appeals for the Fourth Circuit and the United States Supreme Court.

== Sources ==
Legal offices
Preceded by Seat established by 92 Stat. 1629	Judge of the United States District Court for the Western District of Virginia; 1981–1997	Succeeded by Norman K. Moon
Preceded by James Clinton Turk	Chief Judge of the United States District Court for the Western District of Virginia; 1993–1997	Succeeded by Samuel Grayson Wilson
