= In a Shallow Grave =

- Film poster
- Directed by: Kenneth Bowser
- Written by: Kenneth Bowser
- Based on: In a Shallow Grave by James Purdy
- Produced by: Kenneth Bowser
- Starring: Michael Biehn; Patrick Dempsey
- Cinematography: Jerzy Zieliński
- Edited by: Nicholas C. Smith
- Music by: Jonathan Sheffer
- Production companies: American Playhouse; Film Trustees Ltd. Lorimar Productions
- Distributed by: Skouras Pictures
- Release date: April 1988 (Los Angeles International Film Festival)
- Running time: 92 minutes
- Country: United States
- Language: English
- Budget: $1.2 million

In a Shallow Grave is a 1988 American romantic drama film written and directed by Kenneth Bowser and starring Michael Biehn and Patrick Dempsey. It is based on James Purdy's 1976 novel of the same name.

== Cast ==
- Michael Biehn as Garnet Montrose
- Maureen Mueller as Georgina Rance
- Patrick Dempsey as Potter Daventry
- Michael Beach as Quintus Pearch
- Thomas B. Mason as Edgar Doust
- Mike Pettinger as Milkman
- Prentiss Rowe as Postman
- Ron Rosenthal as Army Doctor
- Muriel Moore as Mrs. Gondess
