= James Harry Michael Jr. =

American judge

J. Harry Michael Jr.

Senior Judge of the United States District Court for the Western District of Virginia
- In office October 31, 1995 – August 29, 2005

Judge of the United States District Court for the Western District of Virginia
- In office September 30, 1980 – October 31, 1995
- Appointed by: Jimmy Carter
- Preceded by: Seat established by 92 Stat. 1629
- Succeeded by: James Parker Jones

Member of the Virginia Senate
- In office January 10, 1968 – September 30, 1980
- Preceded by: Edward O. McCue Jr.
- Succeeded by: Tom Michie
- Constituency: 22nd district (1968‍–‍1972); 25th district (1972‍–‍1980)

Personal details
- Born: James Harry Michael Jr. October 17, 1918 Charlottesville, Virginia, U.S.
- Died: August 29, 2005 (aged 86) Charlottesville, Virginia, U.S.
- Party: Democratic
- Education: University of Virginia (BS, LLB)

James Harry Michael Jr. (October 17, 1918 – August 29, 2005) was a United States district judge of the United States District Court for the Western District of Virginia.

== Early life, education and military service ==
Born in Charlottesville, Virginia, Michael received a Bachelor of Science degree from the University of Virginia in 1940 and a Bachelor of Laws from the University of Virginia School of Law in 1942. Following graduation during World War II, Michael served as a lieutenant in the United States Navy, in the southwest Pacific Theater, from 1942 to 1946. He also served in the United States Naval Reserve from 1948 to 1969, achieving the rank of commander and head of the Charlottesville reserve unit.

== Legal and political career ==
Michael had a private legal practice in Charlottesville from 1946 to 1980. A member of the Raven Society and Omicron Delta Kappa since his school days, he was a lecturer at the University of Virginia from 1948 to 1953, as executive director of the University of Virginia Institute of Public Affairs in 1952, and as secretary of the Charlottesville Committee on Foreign Relations from 1950-1975. He served part-time as a judge of the Charlottesville Juvenile and Domestic Relations Court from 1954 to 1962, and as the school board's counsel and special council through 1967. He was a Special Master in Patent Cases for the United States District Court for the Western District of Virginia from 1960 to 1970. Michael also served as chairman of the Council of State Governments in 1976 and was a fellow of the Wilton Hall Foundation in England in 1971.

Aligned with the Democratic party, Michael served on the Charlottesville School Board from 1954 through 1967, during Massive Resistance. Early in this tenure, the school board faced a lawsuit to enforce the Brown v. Board of Education Supreme Court decisions, as well as the policies of successive Byrd organization governors to close schools in any district which sought to comply. In September 1958, Governor Lindsay Almond closed Lane High School and Venable Elementary School in Charlottesville under that policy. However, Governor Almond allowed those schools to reopen in early February, 1959, after joint decisions of the Virginia Supreme Court and Virginia federal district courts on January 19, 1959, caused him to break with that policy. Michael also served on the Board of Trustees of Church Schools in the Episcopal Diocese of Virginia.

In 1967, Michael won election to the Virginia Senate from the 22nd district, which consisted of Albemarle, Fluvanna, Greene, Cumberland, Powehatan and Madison Counties as well as the city of Charlottesville. For the previous five decades, that district had been represented by fellow Democrat and lawyer Edward McCue, a stalwart in the Byrd Organization. Michael would represent Charlottesville and several adjoining counties part time position for little over a decade, from 1968 to 1980. The district number and boundaries changed in the reapportionment following the 1970 census (the new 25th district adding Nelson and Orange Counties, but Powhatan and Cumberland Counties moved to the new 17th district and Madison County to the new 26th district), and he resigned before the start of the 1981 session and Thomas J. Miche Jr, who had represented Albemarle, Greeneand Fluvanna Counties and the City of Charlottesville in the House of Delegates, was elected to fill his unexpired term. 83, Democrats also selected Michael as their nominee for lieutenant governor in 1973 but he lost to Republican John N. Dalton.

== Federal judicial service ==
President Jimmy Carter, a fellow Democrat, on April 9, 1980, nominated Michael to the United States District Court for the Western District of Virginia, to a new seat created by 92 Stat. 1629. The United States Senate confirmed his appointment on September 29, 1980, and Michael received his commission the next day. He became known for his annual speeches at Monticello to newly naturalized citizens, explaining what it means to be an American. Judge Michael assumed senior status on October 31, 1995, and continued on that reduced workload until his death nearly two decades later. One of his more famous cases involved a 1993 antitrust lawsuit brought by Virginia Vermiculite challenging a property donation by W.R. Grace & Co. to a Virginia nonprofit responsible for the Green Springs National Historic Landmark District, and the 4th Circuit Court of Appeals and U.S. Supreme Court upheld his summary judgement against Virginia Vermiculite in 2003.

== Death and legacy ==
Michael survived his wife, Barbara Puryear Michael, and died in Charlottesville on August 29, 2005, survived by a son, daughter and two grandchildren. Michael's papers are held at the Albert and Shirley Small Special Collections Library at the University of Virginia.

== Sources ==
Legal offices
Preceded by Seat established by 92 Stat. 1629	Judge of the United States District Court for the Eastern District of Virginia; 1980–1995	Succeeded by James Parker Jones
