= Robert S. Ballou =

American judge (born 1962)

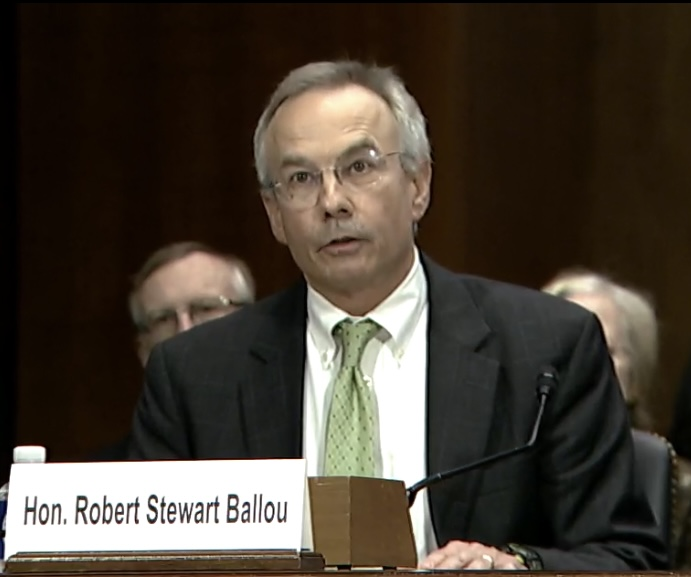

Judge of the United States District Court for the Western District of Virginia
- Incumbent
- Assumed office March 9, 2023
- Appointed by: Joe Biden
- Preceded by: James Parker Jones

Magistrate Judge of the United States District Court for the Western District of Virginia
- In office 2011 – March 9, 2023

Personal details
- Born: Robert Stewart Ballou; 1962 (age 63–64) Roanoke, Virginia, U.S.
- Education: University of Virginia (BA, JD)

Robert Stewart Ballou (born 1962) is an American lawyer serving as a United States district judge of the United States District Court for the Western District of Virginia. He previously served as a United States magistrate judge for the same court.

== Education ==
Ballou earned a Bachelor of Arts from the University of Virginia in 1984 and a Juris Doctor from the University of Virginia School of Law in 1987.

== Career ==
From 1987 to 1988, Ballou served as a law clerk for Judge Peter Beer of the United States District Court for the Eastern District of Louisiana. From 1988 to 1991, he worked as an associate at Christian, Barton, Epps, Brent & Chappell in Richmond, Virginia. From 1992 to 2011, he was a partner at Johnson, Ayers & Matthews in Roanoke, Virginia. In private practice, Ballou specialized in civil litigation, but sometimes accepted personal injury cases.

=== Federal judicial service ===
Ballou served as a United States magistrate judge from 2011 to 2023.

In August 2021, Ballou was one of two candidates recommended to the president by U.S. Senators Mark Warner and Tim Kaine. On July 13, 2022, President Joe Biden nominated Ballou to serve as a United States district judge of the United States District Court for the Western District of Virginia. President Biden nominated Ballou to the seat vacated by Judge James Parker Jones, who assumed senior status on August 30, 2021. Ballou's nomination is supported by Senators Warner and Kaine. On November 15, 2022, a hearing on his nomination was held before the Senate Judiciary Committee. On December 8, 2022, his nomination was reported out of committee by a 16–6 vote. On January 3, 2023, his nomination was returned to the President under Rule XXXI, Paragraph 6 of the United States Senate. He was renominated on January 23, 2023. On February 9, 2023, his nomination was reported out of committee by a 16–5 vote. On March 6, 2023, the Senate invoked cloture on his nomination by a 59–35 vote. On March 7, 2023, his nomination was confirmed by a 59–37 vote. He received his judicial commission on March 9, 2023.

Legal offices
Preceded by James Parker Jones	Judge of the United States District Court for the Western District of Virginia; 2023–present	Incumbent
