= James Parker Jones =

American judge (born 1940)

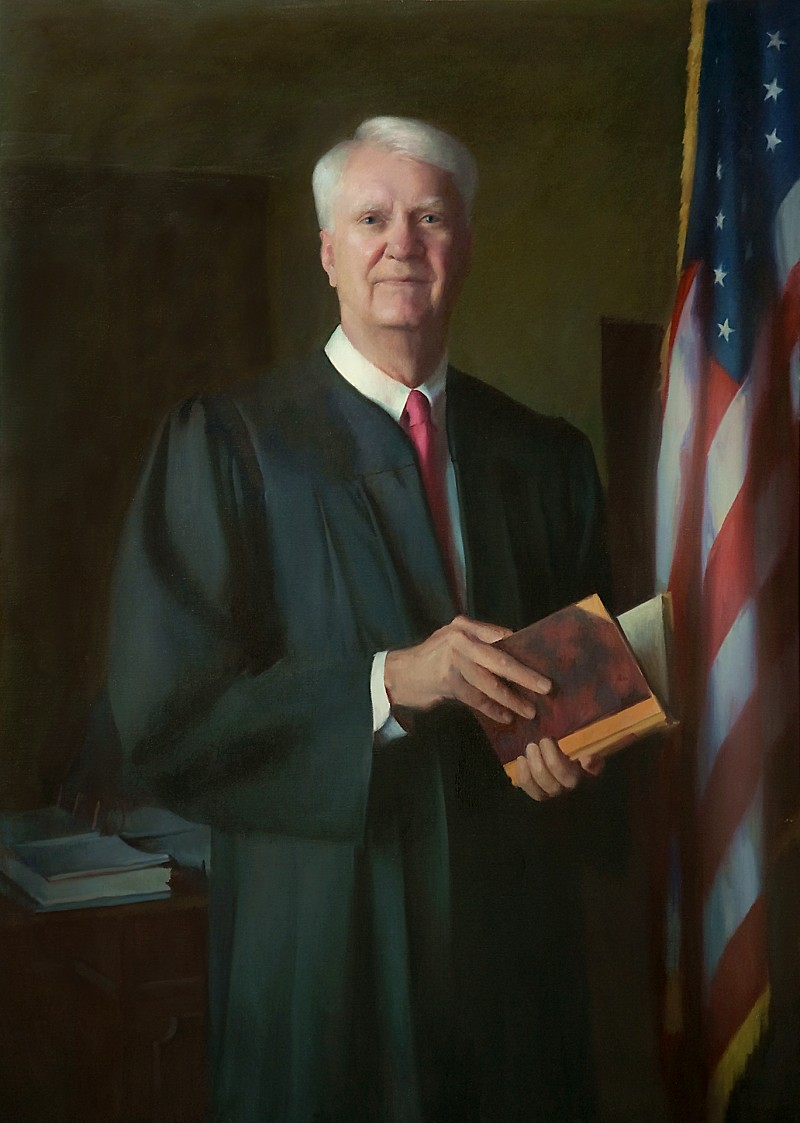

Senior Judge of the United States District Court for the Western District of Virginia
- Incumbent
- Assumed office August 30, 2021

Judge of the United States Foreign Intelligence Surveillance Court
- In office May 19, 2015 – May 18, 2022
- Appointed by: John Roberts
- Preceded by: Mary A. McLaughlin
- Succeeded by: Kenneth M. Karas

Chief Judge of the United States District Court for the Western District of Virginia
- In office 2004–2010
- Preceded by: Samuel Grayson Wilson
- Succeeded by: Glen E. Conrad

Judge of the United States District Court for the Western District of Virginia
- In office August 1, 1996 – August 30, 2021
- Appointed by: Bill Clinton
- Preceded by: James Harry Michael Jr.
- Succeeded by: Robert S. Ballou

Member of the Virginia Senate from the 39th district
- In office January 12, 1983 – January 13, 1988
- Preceded by: Rick Boucher
- Succeeded by: William C. Wampler Jr.

Personal details
- Born: July 3, 1940 (age 86) Tampa, Florida, U.S.
- Party: Democratic
- Education: Duke University (AB); University of Virginia (LLB)

James Parker Jones (born July 3, 1940) is an American lawyer and jurist serving as a senior United States district judge of the United States District Court for the Western District of Virginia. He served as a judge of the United States Foreign Intelligence Surveillance Court from 2015 to 2022. He served as a judge of the United States Alien Terrorist Removal Court from 2016 to 2021.

== Early life and education ==
Jones was born in Tampa, Florida. He received an Artium Baccalaureus degree in psychology from Duke University in 1962 and a Bachelor of Laws from the University of Virginia School of Law in 1965.

== Career ==
Jones was an assistant commonwealth attorney general of Virginia from 1965 to 1966. He was a law clerk for Judge Clement Haynsworth of the United States Court of Appeals for the Fourth Circuit from 1966 to 1968. He was in private practice in Abingdon, Virginia from 1968 to 1971, and in Bristol, Virginia, from 1971 to 1995. He was a member of the Senate of Virginia from 1983 to 1988. He also served on the Virginia State Board of Education from 1990 to 1996.

=== Federal judicial service ===
==== Expired district court nomination under Jimmy Carter ====
On May 16, 1979, President Jimmy Carter nominated Jones to a seat on the United States District Court for the Western District of Virginia. However, the United States Senate did not process Jones' nomination before Carter lost his bid for re-election, and President Ronald Reagan chose not to renominate Jones to the seat.

==== Renomination under Clinton ====
On December 12, 1995, President Bill Clinton nominated Jones to serve as a United States district judge of the United States District Court for the Western District of Virginia to fill the seat vacated by Judge James Harry Michael Jr., who had taken senior status. The United States Senate confirmed Jones on July 18, 1996, and he received his commission on August 1, 1996. Jones served as chief judge from 2004 to 2010. He assumed senior status on August 30, 2021. He served as a judge of the United States Foreign Intelligence Surveillance Court from 2015 to 2022 and as a judge of the United States Alien Terrorist Removal Court from 2016 to 2021.

== Personal life ==
Jones married Mary Duke Trent, the granddaughter of Mary Duke Biddle and Anthony Joseph Drexel Biddle Sr., in 1964.

== Notable cases ==
In 2007, Jones levied a fine of $634.5 million against Purdue Pharma L.P., the maker of OxyContin, and three of its executives for misleading the public regarding the safety of prescription pain medication.

Legal offices
Preceded by James Harry Michael Jr.	Judge of the United States District Court for the Western District of Virginia; 1996–2021	Succeeded by Robert S. Ballou
Preceded by Samuel Grayson Wilson	Chief Judge of the United States District Court for the Western District of Virginia; 2004–2010	Succeeded by Glen E. Conrad
Preceded by Mary A. McLaughlin	Judge of the United States Foreign Intelligence Surveillance Court; 2015–2022	Succeeded by Kenneth M. Karas
