= Jasmine H. Yoon =

American federal judge (born 1980)

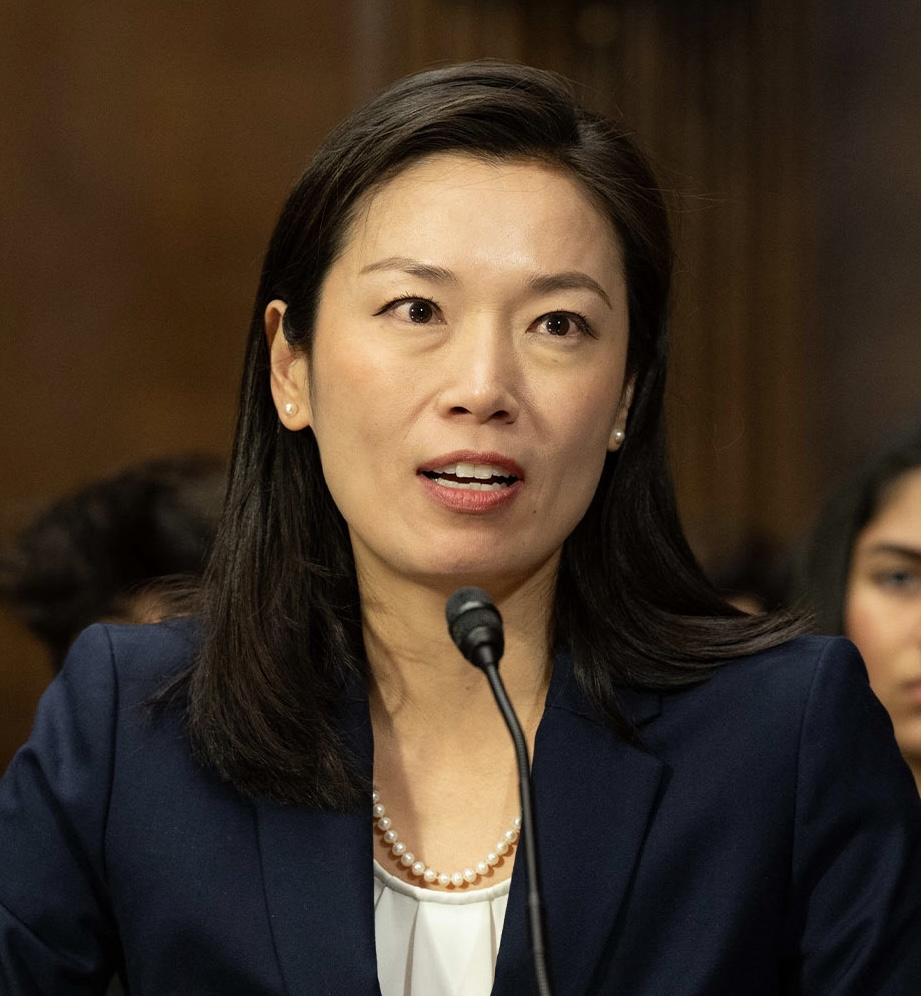
- Yoon in 2024

Judge of the United States District Court for the Western District of Virginia
- Incumbent
- Assumed office July 8, 2024
- Appointed by: Joe Biden
- Preceded by: Michael F. Urbanski

Personal details
- Born: Hyejung Yoon; 1980 (age 45–46) Ulsan, South Korea
- Spouse: Christopher R. Kavanaugh
- Education: University of Virginia (BA, JD)

Jasmine Hyejung Yoon (born 1980) is an American lawyer and jurist serving as a U.S. district judge of the United States District Court for the Western District of Virginia. She was appointed in 2024 by President Joe Biden. She previously was the vice president of Corporate Integrity, Ethics, and Investigations at Capital One.

== Education ==
Yoon received her Bachelor of Arts from the University of Virginia in 2003, where she was a Jefferson Scholar, and her Juris Doctor from the University of Virginia School of Law in 2006.

== Career ==
From 2006 to 2009, she was an associate at Crowell & Moring LLP in Washington, D.C. in its White Collar and Regulatory Enforcement group. From 2009 to 2010, she served as a law clerk for Judge James C. Cacheris of the United States District Court for the Eastern District of Virginia. From 2010 to 2016, Yoon was an assistant U.S. attorney for the Eastern District of Virginia as a member of the White Collar Crimes and Public Corruption Unit. From 2019 to 2022, Yoon was an Interim University Counsel and Associate University Counsel at the University of Virginia in Charlottesville. From 2022 to 2024, she was the Vice President of Corporate Integrity, Ethics, and Investigations at Capital One.

=== Federal judicial service ===
On January 10, 2024, President Joe Biden announced his intent to nominate Yoon as a United States district judge of the United States District Court for the Western District of Virginia. On February 1, 2024, President Biden nominated Yoon to a seat being vacated by Judge Michael F. Urbanski, who subsequently assumed senior status on July 4, 2024. On February 8, 2024, a hearing on her nomination was held before the Senate Judiciary Committee. On March 7, 2024, her nomination was reported out of committee by a 14–7 vote. On March 11, 2024, the United States Senate invoked cloture on her nomination by a 52–38 vote. On March 12, 2024, her nomination was confirmed by a 55–41 vote. She received her judicial commission on July 8, 2024. Yoon became the first Asian American judge to serve on the Western District of Virginia. On October 4, 2024, a formal investiture ceremony was held at the University of Virginia School of Law.

== Personal life ==
Yoon is married to Christopher R. Kavanaugh. who served as United States Attorney for the Western District of Virginia from 2021 to 2024.

== See also ==
- List of Asian American jurists

Legal offices
Preceded by Michael F. Urbanski	Judge of the United States District Court for the Western District of Virginia; 2024–present	Incumbent
