= J. Marion Smith =

American politician (1880–1953)

Member of the Virginia Senate from the 16th district
- In office January 9, 1952 – May 30, 1953
- Preceded by: Lloyd M. Robinette
- Succeeded by: Glen M. Williams

Member of the Virginia House of Delegates from Lee County
- In office January 14, 1948 – January 9, 1952
- Preceded by: A. P. Hamblen
- Succeeded by: Walter B. Greene

Personal details
- Born: James Marion Smith; October 26, 1880 Lee County, Virginia, U.S.
- Died: May 30, 1953 (aged 72) Pennington Gap, Virginia, U.S.
- Party: Republican
- Spouses: Hannah Gilbert Farley; Ida Mae Nelms

James Marion Smith (October 26, 1880 – May 30, 1953) was an American farmer, newspaper editor, and politician who served in both houses of the Virginia General Assembly. A Republican, he was elected to the Virginia House of Delegates in 1947 and reelected in 1949. In 1951, he challenged longtime incumbent Lloyd M. Robinette for the 16th district seat in the Virginia Senate. Robinette's name remained on the ballot despite his suicide days before the general election. Smith won by a narrow margin and served until his death.
