= Thomas B. Mason =

American actor

Thomas Mason
- Born: January 12, 1919; Lynchburg, Virginia
- Died: March 9, 2007 (aged 88); Roanoke, Virginia

Thomas Boyd Mason (January 12, 1919 – March 9, 2007) was an American United States Attorney for the Western District of Virginia (1961–1969), and an actor.

== Biography ==
Mason was appointed United States Attorney for the Western District of Virginia by John F. Kennedy in 1961. Prior to this appointment, Mason and Kennedy had served together in the South Pacific as naval officers during World War II, and Mason was subsequently a district campaign coordinator for Kennedy's presidential bid. Mason served as U.S. Attorney for two terms, until 1969. The current U.S. attorney's offices in Roanoke are named for Mason.

After his second term, he took a job at Norfolk and Western Railway working as a liaison to the General Assembly. He retired in 1983.

== Achievements ==
Mason graduated from the University of Virginia School of Law in 1941. He worked as a general practice lawyer in Lynchburg for 10 years. From 1956 to 1961 he worked for the People's National Bank and Trust Company in Lynchburg as both trust officer and later, as vice president.

Aside from his successes in law and politics, Mason is also well known for his talents on stage. Mason began acting while a freshman at Hampden-Sydney College. In 1971, he began acting again with Hollins College Theatre, Showtimers and Mill Mountain Theatre. He was especially known for his stage portrayals of Elwood P. Dowd in Harvey, and Norman Thayer in On Golden Pond.

Mason appeared in four feature films: Crimes of the Heart, In a Shallow Grave, Mississippi Burning and Gods and Generals. He also appeared in made-for-television movies.

Friends credited Mason's charisma, sharp wit, love of life and genuine interest in people that propelled him to success. "Tom was a citizen of the world," said former state Del. Clifton Woodrum III, who knew Mason from his time as federal prosecutor. "Anything that involved people, he would excel at. … The worst mood I ever saw him in was cheerful."

Legal offices
Preceded by John Strickler	United States Attorney for the Western District of Virginia; 1961–1969	Succeeded by Leigh B. Hanes
