= United States v. Russell (2025) =

- Court: U.S. District Court for the District of Maryland
- Started: 2025
- Docket nos.: 1:25-cv-02029

Court membership
- Judge sitting: Thomas T. Cullen

United States v. Russell was a lawsuit by the second Trump administration against all 15 federal judges in Maryland. The suit challenges an order which enjoins the administration from removing or altering the legal status of habeas petitioners who have filed their petition in the District Court of Maryland until 4 p.m. on the second business day after the habeas corpus petition is filed. In August 2025, Judge Cullen dismissed the lawsuit.

== See also ==
- Arrest of Hannah Dugan
- Nken v. Holder
