= Christopher R. Kavanaugh =

American lawyer (born 1980)

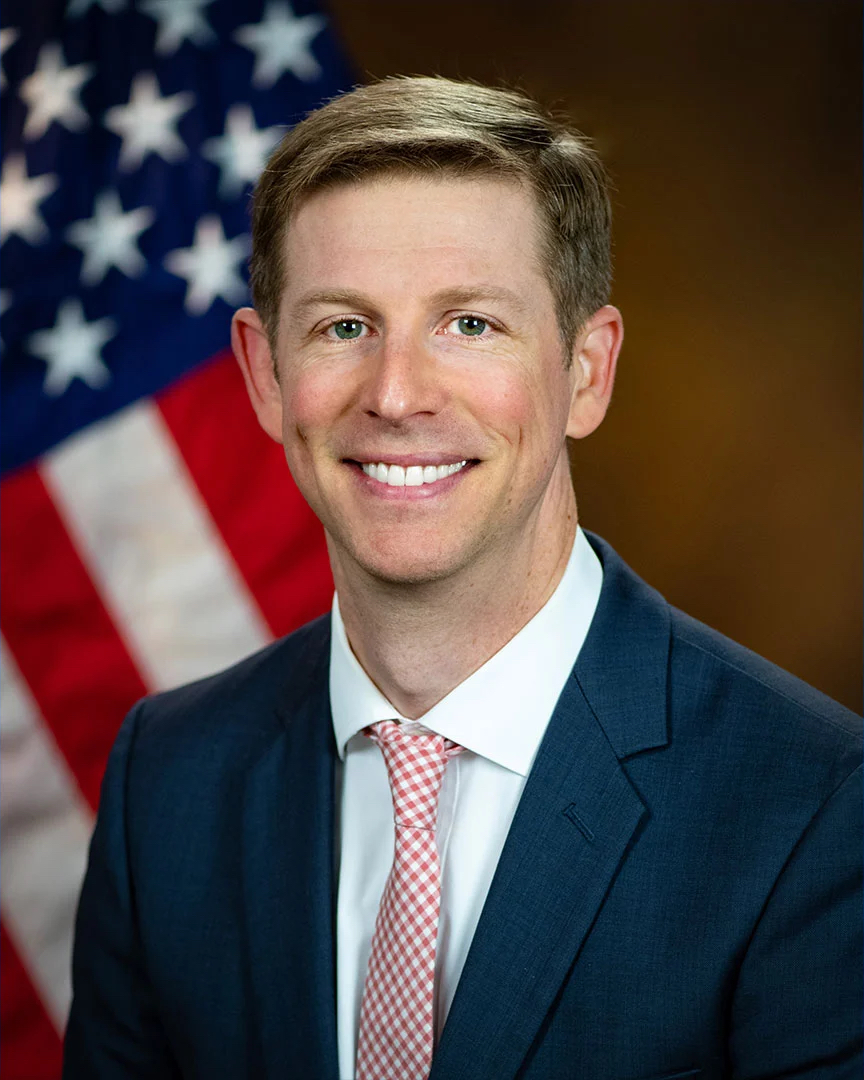

United States Attorney for the Western District of Virginia
- In office October 7, 2021 – December 20, 2024
- Appointed by: Joe Biden
- Preceded by: Thomas T. Cullen; Daniel P. Bubar (acting)
- Succeeded by: Zachary T. Lee (acting)

Personal details
- Born: Christopher Robert Kavanaugh; 1980 (age 45–46) Gastonia, North Carolina, U.S.
- Spouse: Jasmine H. Yoon
- Education: Georgia Institute of Technology (BE); University of Virginia (JD)

Christopher Robert Kavanaugh (born 1980) is an American attorney who served as the United States Attorney for the Western District of Virginia from 2021 to 2024.

== Education ==
Kavanaugh received his Bachelor of Engineering from Georgia Tech in 2002 and a Juris Doctor from the University of Virginia School of Law in 2006.

== Career ==
Kavanaugh was a law clerk for Judge James C. Cacheris of the United States District Court for the Eastern District of Virginia from 2006 to 2007. From 2007 to 2014, Kavanaugh was an Assistant United States Attorney in the United States Attorney's Office for the District of Columbia.

Kavanaugh served as an assistant U.S. attorney for the Western District of Virginia from 2014 to 2021. In this role, he was the chief national security prosecutor, senior litigation counsel, and counsel to the United States attorney for the Western District of Virginia. He has served as senior counsel for the United States deputy attorney general. Since 2011, he has been an adjunct professor at the University of Virginia School of Law, where he teaches federal criminal practice and trial advocacy.

=== U.S. attorney for the Western District of Virginia ===
In March 2021, Senators Tim Kaine and Mark Warner recommended Kavanaugh and one other candidate to the White House. On August 10, 2021, President Joe Biden nominated Kavanaugh to be the United States attorney for the Western District of Virginia. On September 30, 2021, his nomination was reported out of committee by voice vote. On October 5, 2021, his nomination was confirmed in the United States Senate by voice vote. On the evening of October 7, 2021, he was sworn into office by deputy attorney general Lisa Monaco. On August 28, 2024, he announced his intent to resign from his position as United States Attorney for the Western District of Virginia effective at the end of the year. He resigned from office on December 20, 2024.

=== Private Practice ===
Since 2025, Kavanaugh has been a partner at Cleary Gottlieb in Washington, DC.

== Personal life ==
Kavanaugh is married to Jasmine H. Yoon, the former vice president of corporate integrity, ethics, and investigations at Capital One and a judge for the United States District Court for the Western District of Virginia.

He is not related to United States Supreme Court Justice Brett Kavanaugh.

Legal offices
| Preceded by Daniel P. Bubar | United States Attorney for the Western District of Virginia; 2021–2024 | Succeeded by Zachary T. Lee; Acting |
