= Samuel Grayson Wilson =

American judge (born 1949)

Chief Judge of the United States District Court for the Western District of Virginia
- In office 1997–2004
- Preceded by: Jackson L. Kiser
- Succeeded by: James Parker Jones

Judge of the United States District Court for the Western District of Virginia
- In office May 14, 1990 – July 31, 2014
- Appointed by: George H. W. Bush
- Preceded by: Glen Morgan Williams
- Succeeded by: Elizabeth K. Dillon

Magistrate Judge of the United States District Court for the Western District of Virginia
- In office 1976–1981

Personal details
- Born: 1949 (age 76–77) Norfolk, Virginia, U.S.
- Education: University of Richmond (BA); Wake Forest University (JD)

Samuel Grayson Wilson (born 1949) is a former United States district judge of the United States District Court for the Western District of Virginia.

== Education and career ==
Born in Norfolk, Virginia, Wilson received a Bachelor of Arts degree from the University of Richmond in 1971 and a Juris Doctor from Wake Forest University School of Law in 1974. He was an assistant commonwealth's attorney of Roanoke, Virginia from 1974 to 1976, and was an Assistant United States Attorney of the Western District of Virginia in 1976. He was a United States magistrate judge of the Western District of Virginia from 1976 to 1981, returning to private practice in Roanoke, Virginia from 1981 to 1990.

== Federal judicial service ==
On March 6, 1990, Wilson was nominated by President George H. W. Bush to a seat on the United States District Court for the Western District of Virginia vacated by Judge Glen Morgan Williams. Wilson was confirmed by the United States Senate on May 11, 1990, and received his commission on May 14, 1990. He served as Chief Judge from 1997 to 2004. Wilson retired from the federal bench effective July 31, 2014.

Legal offices
Preceded by Glen Morgan Williams	Judge of the United States District Court for the Western District of Virginia; 1990–2014	Succeeded by Elizabeth K. Dillon
Preceded by Jackson L. Kiser	Chief Judge of the United States District Court for the Western District of Virginia; 1997–2004	Succeeded by James Parker Jones
