= United States District Court for the Western District of Virginia =

United States federal district court in Virginia

Coordinates: 37°16′7″N 79°56′40″W

- (W.D. Va.)
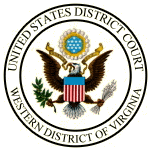
- Location: Richard H. Poff Federal Building (Roanoke) More locations: Charlottesville; Harrisonburg; Lynchburg; Abingdon; Big Stone Gap; Danville
- Appeals to: Fourth Circuit
- Established: February 4, 1819
- Judges: 4
- Chief Judge: Elizabeth K. Dillon

Officers of the court
- U.S. Attorney: Robert Tracci (acting)
- U.S. Marshal: Thomas L. Foster
- www.vawd.uscourts.gov

Map of the United States District Courts in Virginia, showing the boundaries of the Eastern and Western Districts, and their divisions.

The United States District Court for the Western District of Virginia (in case citations, W.D. Va.) is a United States district court.

Appeals from the Western District of Virginia are taken to the United States Court of Appeals for the Fourth Circuit (except for patent claims and claims against the U.S. government under the Tucker Act, which are appealed to the Federal Circuit).

The court is seated at multiple locations in Virginia: Abingdon, Charlottesville, Danville, Harrisonburg, Lynchburg and Roanoke.

== History ==
The United States District Court for the District of Virginia was one of the original 13 courts established by the Judiciary Act of 1789, 1 Stat. 73, on September 24, 1789.

On February 13, 1801, the Judiciary Act of 1801, 2 Stat. 89, divided Virginia into three judicial districts: the District of Virginia, which included the counties west of the Tidewater and south of the Rappahannock River; the District of Norfolk, which included the Tidewater counties south of the Rappahannock; and the District of Potomac, which included the counties north and east of the Rappahannock as well as Maryland counties along the Potomac. Just over a year later, on March 8, 1802, the Judiciary Act of 1801 was repealed and Virginia became a single District again, 2 Stat. 132, effective July 1, 1802.

The District of Virginia was subdivided into Eastern and Western Districts on February 4, 1819, by 3 Stat. 478. At that time, West Virginia, was still part of Virginia, and was encompassed in Virginia's Western District, while the Eastern District essentially covered what is now the entire state of Virginia. With the division of West Virginia from Virginia during the American Civil War, the Western District of Virginia became the District of West Virginia, and those parts of the Western District that were not part of West Virginia were combined with the Eastern District to form again a single District of Virginia on June 11, 1864, by 13 Stat. 124. Congress again divided Virginia into Eastern and the Western Districts on February 3, 1871, by 16 Stat. 403.

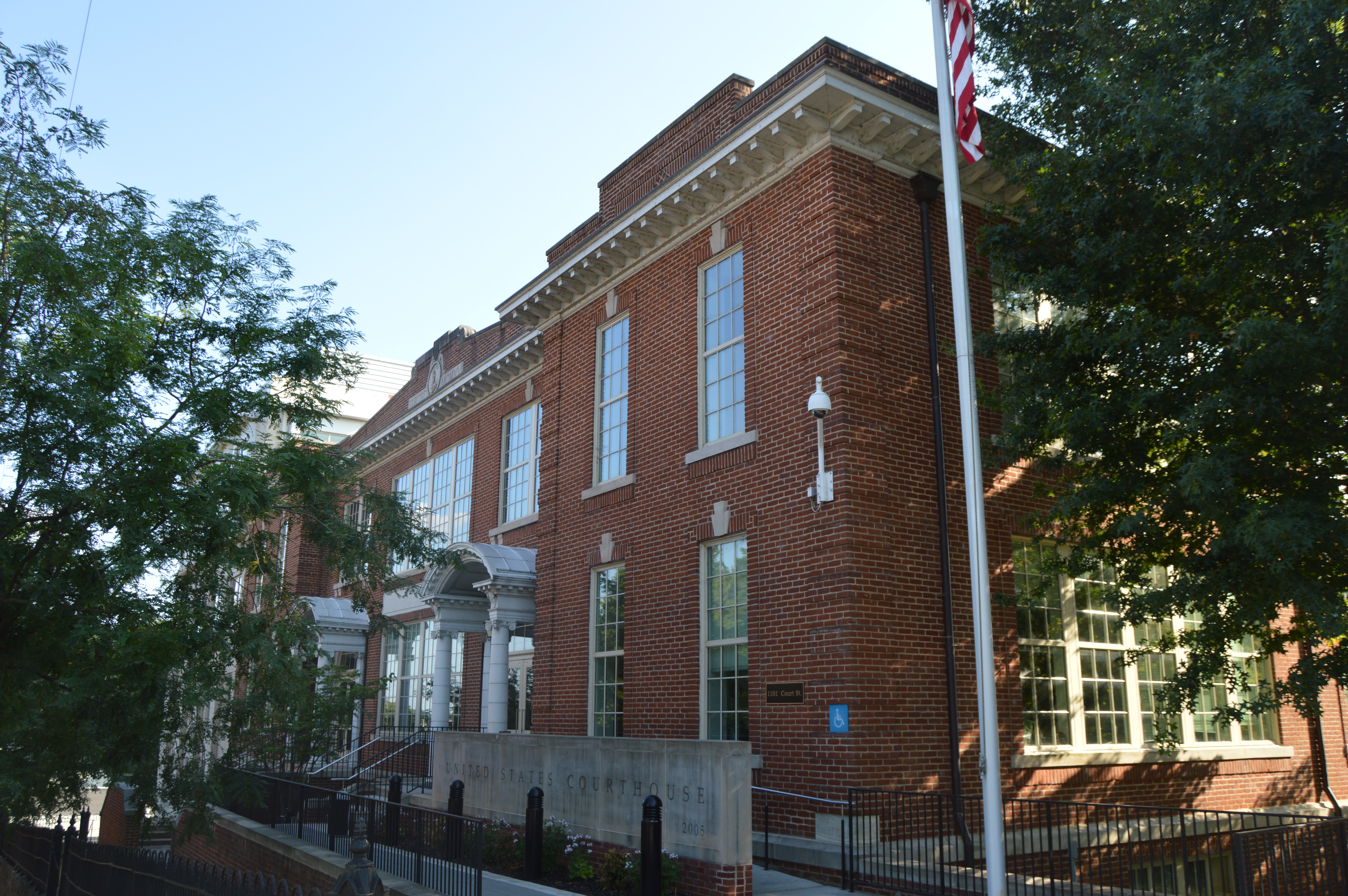
District courthouse in Lynchburg

== Counties of jurisdiction ==
The Western District of Virginia covers the counties of Albemarle, Alleghany, Amherst, Appomattox, Augusta, Bath, Bedford, Bland, Botetourt, Buchanan, Buckingham, Campbell, Carroll, Charlotte, Clarke, Craig, Culpeper, Cumberland, Dickenson, Floyd, Fluvanna, Franklin, Frederick, Giles, Grayson, Greene, Halifax, Henry, Highland, Lee, Louisa, Madison, Montgomery, Nelson, Orange, Page, Patrick, Pittsylvania, Pulaski, Rappahannock, Roanoke, Rockbridge, Rockingham, Russell, Scott, Shenandoah, Smyth, Tazewell, Warren, Washington, Wise, and Wythe; and the independent cities of Bedford, Bristol, Buena Vista, Charlottesville, Covington, Danville, Galax, Harrisonburg, Lexington, Lynchburg, Martinsville, Norton, Radford, Roanoke, Salem, Staunton, Waynesboro, and Winchester.

== Current judges ==
As of July 8, 2024:

| # | Title | Judge | Duty station | Born | Term of service | | | Appointed by |
| # | Title | Judge | Duty station | Born | Active | Chief | Senior | Appointed by |
|---|---|---|---|---|---|---|---|---|
| 27 | Chief Judge | Elizabeth K. Dillon | Roanoke | 1960 | 2014–present | 2024–present | — | Obama |
| 28 | District Judge | Thomas T. Cullen | Roanoke | 1977 | 2020–present | — | — | Trump |
| 29 | District Judge | Robert S. Ballou | Roanoke | 1962 | 2023–present | — | — | Biden |
| 30 | District Judge | Jasmine H. Yoon | Charlottesville | 1980 | 2024–present | — | — | Biden |
| 23 | Senior Judge | James Parker Jones | Abingdon | 1940 | 1996–2021 | 2004–2010 | 2021–present | Clinton |
| 24 | Senior Judge | Norman K. Moon | Lynchburg | 1936 | 1997–2010 | — | 2010–present | Clinton |
| 26 | Senior Judge | Michael F. Urbanski | Roanoke | 1956 | 2011–2024 | 2017–2024 | 2024–present | Obama |

== Former judges ==
| # | Judge | Born–died | Active service | Chief Judge | Senior status | Appointed by | Reason for termination |
|---|---|---|---|---|---|---|---|
| 1 | John G. Jackson | 1777–1825 | 1819–1825 | — | — | Monroe | death |
| 2 | Philip C. Pendleton | 1779–1863 | 1825–1825 (Note: Recess appointment; the United States Senate later rejected the appointment.) | — | — | J.Q. Adams | resignation |
| 3 | Alexander Caldwell | 1774–1839 | 1825–1839 (Note: Recess appointment; formally nominated on December 13, 1825, confirmed by the Senate on January 3, 1826, and received commission the same day.) | — | — | J.Q. Adams | death |
| 4 | Isaac S. Pennybacker | 1805–1847 | 1839–1845 (Note: Recess appointment; formally nominated on January 29, 1840, confirmed by the Senate on February 17, 1840, and received commission the same day.) | — | — | Van Buren | resignation |
| 5 | John Brockenbrough | 1806–1877 | 1846–1861 | — | — | Polk | resignation |
| 6 | John Jay Jackson Jr. | 1824–1907 | 1861–1864 | — | — | Lincoln | reassignment |
| 7 | Alexander Rives | 1806–1885 | 1871–1882 | — | — | Grant | retirement |
| 8 | John Paul | 1839–1901 | 1883–1901 | — | — | Arthur | death |
| 9 | Henry C. McDowell Jr. | 1861–1933 | 1901–1931 (Note: Recess appointment; formally nominated on December 5, 1901, confirmed by the Senate on December 18, 1901, and received commission the same day.) | — | 1931–1933 | T. Roosevelt | death |
| 10 | John Paul Jr. | 1883–1964 | 1932–1958 | 1948–1958 | 1958–1964 | Hoover | death |
| 11 | Floyd H. Roberts | 1879–1967 | 1938–1939 (Note: Recess appointment; the Senate later rejected the appointment.) | — | — | F. Roosevelt | not confirmed |
| 12 | Armistead Mason Dobie | 1881–1962 | 1939–1940 | — | — | F. Roosevelt | elevation |
| 13 | Alfred D. Barksdale | 1892–1972 | 1939–1957 (Note: Recess appointment; formally nominated on January 11, 1940, confirmed by the United States Senate on February 1, 1940, and received commission on February 5, 1940.) | — | 1957–1972 | F. Roosevelt | death |
| 14 | Roby C. Thompson | 1898–1960 | 1957–1960 | 1958–1960 | — | Eisenhower | death |
| 15 | Theodore Dalton | 1901–1989 | 1959–1976 | 1960–1971 | 1976–1989 | Eisenhower | death |
| 16 | Thomas J. Michie | 1896–1973 | 1961–1973 | — | — | Kennedy | death |
| 17 | Hiram Emory Widener Jr. | 1923–2007 | 1969–1972 | 1971–1972 | — | Nixon | elevation |
| 18 | James Clinton Turk | 1923–2014 | 1972–2002 | 1973–1993 | 2002–2014 | Nixon | death |
| 19 | Glen Morgan Williams | 1920–2012 | 1976–1988 | — | 1988–2012 | Ford | death |
| 20 | James Harry Michael Jr. | 1918–2005 | 1980–1995 | — | 1995–2005 | Carter | death |
| 21 | Jackson L. Kiser | 1929–2020 | 1981–1997 | 1993–1997 | 1997–2020 | Reagan | death |
| 22 | Samuel Grayson Wilson | 1949–present | 1990–2014 | 1997–2004 | — | G.H.W. Bush | retirement |
| 25 | Glen E. Conrad | 1949–2021 | 2003–2017 | 2010–2017 | 2017–2021 | G.W. Bush | death |

== Chief judges ==
Chief judges have administrative responsibilities with respect to their district court. Unlike the Supreme Court, where one justice is specifically nominated to be chief, the office of chief judge rotates among the district court judges. To be chief, a judge must have been in active service on the court for at least one year, be under the age of 65, and have not previously served as chief judge.

A vacancy is filled by the judge highest in seniority among the group of qualified judges. The chief judge serves for a term of seven years, or until age 70, whichever occurs first. The age restrictions are waived if no members of the court would otherwise be qualified for the position.

When the office was created in 1948, the chief judge was the longest-serving judge who had not elected to retire, on what has since 1958 been known as senior status, or declined to serve as chief judge. After August 6, 1959, judges could not become or remain chief after turning 70 years old. The current rules have been in operation since October 1, 1982.

== Succession of seats ==
Seat 1
Seat established on February 4, 1819 by 3 Stat. 478
| Jackson | 1819–1825 |
| Pendleton | 1825–1825 |
| Caldwell | 1826–1839 |
| Pennybacker | 1840–1845 |
| Brockenbrough | 1846–1861 |
| Jackson, Jr. | 1861–1864 |
Seat reassigned to the District of West Virginia on June 11, 1864 by 13 Stat. 124

Seat 2
Seat established on February 3, 1871 by 16 Stat. 403
| Rives | 1871–1882 |
| Paul | 1883–1901 |
| McDowell, Jr. | 1901–1931 |
| Paul, Jr. | 1932–1958 |
| Dalton | 1959–1976 |
| Williams | 1976–1988 |
| Wilson | 1990–2014 |
| Dillon | 2014–present |

Seat 3
Seat established on May 31, 1938 by 52 Stat. 584
| Roberts | 1938–1939 |
| Dobie | 1939–1940 |
| Barksdale | 1940–1957 |
| Thompson | 1957–1960 |
| Michie | 1961–1973 |
Seat abolished on April 9, 1973 pursuant to the provisions of 71 Stat. 586

Seat 4
Seat established on July 14, 1969 pursuant to the provisions of 71 Stat. 586 (temporary)
| Widener, Jr. | 1969–1972 |
Seat became permanent upon the abolition of Seat 3 on April 9, 1973
| Turk | 1972–2002 |
| Conrad | 2003–2017 |
| Cullen | 2020–present |

Seat 5
Seat established on October 20, 1978 by 92 Stat. 1629
| Michael, Jr. | 1980–1995 |
| Jones | 1996–2021 |
| Ballou | 2023–present |

Seat 6
Seat established on October 20, 1978 by 92 Stat. 1629
| Kiser | 1981–1997 |
| Moon | 1997–2010 |
| Urbanski | 2011–2024 |
| Yoon | 2024–present |

== U.S. Attorney and U.S. Marshal ==
The U.S. attorney for the Western District of Virginia represents the federal government in the court. As of August 20, 2025 the acting United States attorney is Robert Tracci.

The current U.S. marshal for the Western District of Virginia is Thomas L. Foster.

== Former U.S. attorneys ==
- Edwin S. Duncan (1824–1829)
- William A. Harrison (1829–1834)
- Washington G. Singleton (1834–1842)
- William Kinney (1842–1843)
- Moses C. Good (1843–1846)
- George H. Lee (1846–1848)
- George W. Thompson (1848–1850)
- Benjamin H. Smith (1850–1853)
- Flaming B. Miller (1853–1861)
- Thomas W. Harrison (1861)
- Aquilla B. Caldwell (1861–1862)
- Benjamin H. Smith (1862)
- Warren S. Lurty (1877–1882)
- D.S. Lewis (1882–1885)
- Henry C. Allen (1885–1889)
- William E. Craig (1889–1893)
- A. J. Montague (1893–1898)
- Thomas M. Alderson (1898–1902)
- Thomas L. Moore (1902–1910)
- Barnes Gillespie (1910–1914)
- Richard E. Byrd (1914–1920)
- Joseph J. Chitwood (1920–1921)
- Thomas J. Muncy (1921–1922)
- Lewis P. Summers (1922–1924)
- Joseph C. Shaffer (1924–1929)
- John Paul (1929–1932)
- Joseph C. Shaffer (1932–1933)
- Joseph H. Chitwood (1933–1940)
- Frank S. Tavenner Jr. (1940–1948)
- Howard C. Gilmer Jr. (1948–1953)
- John Strickler (1953–1961)
- Thomas B. Mason (1961–1969)
- Leigh B. Hanes (1969–1976)
- Paul R. Thomson Jr. (1976–1980)
- John S. Edwards (1980–1981)
- John P. Alderman (1981–1990)
- E. Montgomery Tucker (1990–1993)
- Robert P. Crouch Jr. (1993–2001)
- John L. Brownlee (2001–2008)
- Timothy J. Heaphy (2009–2015)
- John P. Fishwick Jr. (2015–2017)
- Thomas T. Cullen (2018–2020)
- Daniel P. Bubar (2020–2021; acting)
- Christopher R. Kavanaugh (2021–2024)
- Zachary T. Lee (2024–2025; acting)
- Todd Gilbert (2025; acting)
- Robert Tracci (2025–; acting)

== See also ==
- Courts of Virginia
- List of current United States district judges
- List of United States federal courthouses in Virginia
- United States Attorney for the District of Virginia
