= Armistead Mason Dobie =

American judge (1881–1962)

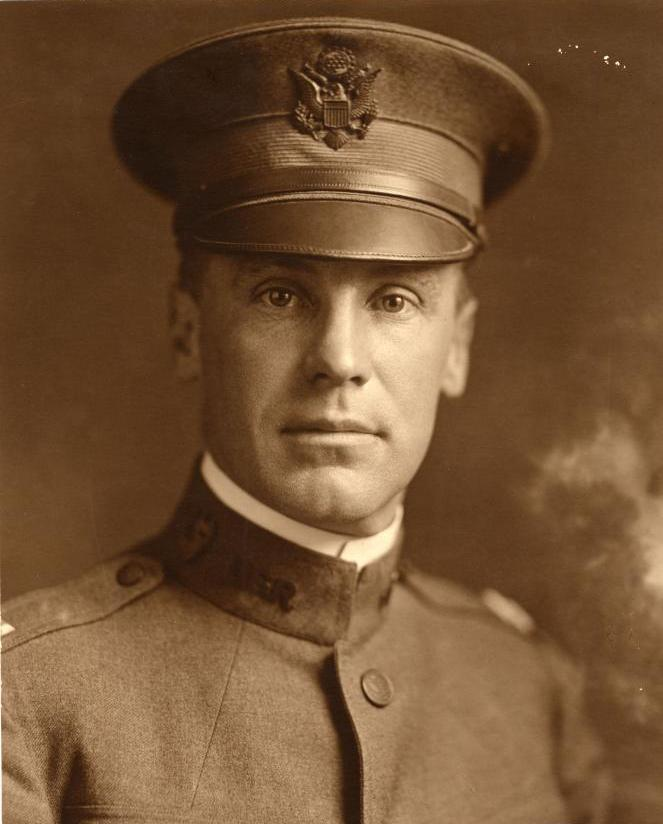
- Armistead M. Dobie in military uniform 1917–1919

Senior Judge of the United States Court of Appeals for the Fourth Circuit
- In office February 1, 1956 – August 7, 1962

Judge of the United States Court of Appeals for the Fourth Circuit
- In office December 19, 1939 – February 1, 1956
- Appointed by: Franklin D. Roosevelt
- Preceded by: Elliott Northcott
- Succeeded by: Clement Haynsworth

Judge of the United States District Court for the Western District of Virginia
- In office June 2, 1939 – February 8, 1940
- Appointed by: Franklin D. Roosevelt
- Preceded by: Floyd H. Roberts
- Succeeded by: Alfred D. Barksdale

2nd Dean of the University of Virginia School of Law
- In office 1932–1939
- Preceded by: William Minor Lile
- Succeeded by: F. D. G. Ribble

Personal details
- Born: Armistead Mason Dobie; April 15, 1881 Norfolk, Virginia, U.S.
- Died: August 7, 1962 (aged 81) Charlottesville, Virginia, U.S.
- Resting place: University of Virginia Cemetery
- Education: University of Virginia (BA, MA); University of Virginia School of Law (LLB)

Armistead Mason Dobie (April 15, 1881 – August 7, 1962) was an American academic and judge. He was a law professor and dean of the University of Virginia School of Law. Dobie also served as a United States circuit judge of the United States Court of Appeals for the Fourth Circuit and was the United States District Judge of the United States District Court for the Western District of Virginia.

== Early life and education ==
Dobie was born on April 15, 1881, in Norfolk, Virginia. He received a Bachelor of Arts degree from the University of Virginia in 1901, a Master of Arts degree from the same institution in 1902, and a Bachelor of Laws degree from the University of Virginia School of Law in 1904. While at the university, he was a member of the O.W.L. Society.and a charter member of the Raven Society.

During World War I, Dobie served in France as assistant chief of staff of the 80th Division of the United States Army from 1917 to 1919. He took a one-year leave of absence from teaching at the University of Virginia to earn a doctorate in juridical science (SJD) at Harvard University, under Felix Frankfurter.

== Career ==
=== Private practice ===
Dobie was in private practice in St. Louis, Missouri from 1904 to 1907.

=== Academia ===
Dobie was an adjunct professor at the University of Virginia School of Law in 1907, and a full professor from 1909 to 1939. He was its dean from 1932 to 1939.

Dobie is credited with first introducing the case method of instruction to Virginia." He was widely published on a variety of legal and non-legal topics, and was an expert on federal court jurisdiction, and a member of the original drafting committee of the Federal Rules of Civil Procedure.

In his years at the university, Dobie was known for his lectures. His annual Easter lecture became known as the "Dobie lecture," which law students reportedly attended along with dates. He was highly involved in university events, including giving pep talks to the football team before Homecoming games.

=== Federal judicial service ===
A dispute between Franklin D. Roosevelt and Virginia's senators Carter Glass and Harry F. Byrd Sr. resulted in the rejection of Roosevelt's recess appointment of Floyd H. Roberts to a newly created seat on the United States District Court for the Western District of Virginia. Then Solicitor General Robert H. Jackson recalled that Roosevelt "thought Glass and Byrd would support Dobie and thereby break the deadlock without loss of face to anybody." Moreover, Roosevelt authorized Jackson to put out the word that Roosevelt would support Dobie for an upcoming vacancy on the United States Court of Appeals for the Fourth Circuit. When Jackson went to meet with Dobie at the Farmington Country Club, Dobie agreed to the President's offer, and soon thereafter Senators Glass and Byrd offered their support. Another account relates Judge Dobie's appointment this way: "Years earlier, Roosevelt's son wanted to attend the University of Virginia, and Judge Dobie helped him gain admission. Thus, although Roosevelt had previously promised the next Fourth Circuit opening to Senator Byrnes of South Carolina, the President had to back out of that promise to reward Judge Dobie for his efforts on behalf of Roosevelt's son."

Dobie was nominated by President Franklin D. Roosevelt on May 16, 1939, to a seat on the United States District Court for the Western District of Virginia vacated by Judge Floyd H. Roberts. He was confirmed by the United States Senate on May 25, 1939, and received his commission on June 2, 1939. His service terminated on February 8, 1940, due to his elevation to the Fourth Circuit.

Dobie received a recess appointment from President Franklin D. Roosevelt on December 19, 1939, to a seat on the United States Court of Appeals for the Fourth Circuit vacated by Judge Elliott Northcutt. He was nominated to the same position by President Franklin D. Roosevelt on January 11, 1940. He was confirmed by the United States Senate on February 1, 1940, and received his commission on February 5, 1940. He assumed senior status on February 1, 1956. His service terminated on August 7, 1962, due to his death.

=== Fourth Circuit service ===
On the Court of Appeals, Dobie worked with Judges John J. Parker and Morris Ames Soper. Their civil rights decisions included Alston v. School Board. A fourth seat on the Court was not added until 1961. "Judge Dobie sat for over 1400 Fourth Circuit cases, yet he authored only six dissents. However, as a remarkable testament to Judge Dobie's legal mind, the United States Supreme Court adopted the reasoning of four of his six dissents when the Court subsequently overruled the Fourth Circuit majority in those particular cases."

== Death and legacy ==
Dobie died August 7, 1962, in Charlottesville, Virginia. "A bachelor until just four years before his death, Judge Dobie spent his entire life thoroughly engrossed in the noble endeavor to learn, interpret, and apply the law to the daily lives of the people who came before his court. Apparent from his many decisions, the praise of his colleagues, and the admiration of the students he taught, Judge Dobie's love of the law permeated and influenced countless lives. As John S. Battle, the former Governor of Virginia and student of Judge Dobie, stated at a memorial for Judge Dobie in the Fourth Circuit courtroom in 1963, 'Judge Dobie is not dead; thousands of students of the law who sat at his feet will not forget him, and the learned opinions he wrote while a member of [the Fourth Circuit] will not die.'"

Legal offices
Preceded by Floyd H. Roberts	Judge of the United States District Court for the Western District of Virginia; 1939–1940	Succeeded by Alfred D. Barksdale
Preceded by Elliott Northcott	Judge of the United States Court of Appeals for the Fourth Circuit; 1940–1956	Succeeded by Clement Haynsworth
