= Roby C. Thompson =

American judge

Chief Judge of the United States District Court for the Western District of Virginia
- In office 1958–1960
- Preceded by: John Paul Jr.
- Succeeded by: Theodore Roosevelt Dalton

Judge of the United States District Court for the Western District of Virginia
- In office August 30, 1957 – July 29, 1960
- Appointed by: Dwight D. Eisenhower
- Preceded by: Alfred D. Barksdale
- Succeeded by: Thomas J. Michie

Personal details
- Born: Roby Calvin Thompson; March 30, 1898 Saltville, Virginia
- Died: July 29, 1960 (aged 62) Abingdon, Virginia
- Resting place: Knollkreg Memorial Park, Abingdon, Virginia
- Children: 2 sons
- Parent: John H. Thompson
- Education: University of Virginia School of Law (LL.B.)

Roby Calvin Thompson (March 30, 1898 – July 29, 1960) was a United States district judge of the United States District Court for the Western District of Virginia.

== Early life and education ==
Thompson was born at Allison Gap near Saltville, in Washington County, Virginia, the eldest son of the former Minnie Moore (1878-1966) and her saltmaking laborer husband John Harvey Thompson (1875-1954) Probably a distant relative, John H. Thompson had represented Smyth County in the Virginia House of Delegates for one term during the final years of the Civil War (1863–5), and represented both Smyth and adjoining Washington County in the Virginia Constitutional Convention of 1868. However, this boy's still-living grandfather at the time was North Carolina born Calvin Thompson (1846-1926; hence this man's middle name). After a primary education locally, Thompson traveled to Charlottesville for further studies and received a Bachelor of Laws from University of Virginia School of Law in 1922.

== Career ==
Upon admission to the Virginia bar, Thompson practiced law in Abingdon and adjoining counties from 1922 to 1957. He served as a deputy clerk of the United States District Court in Abingdon from 1928 to 1938. Washington County voters elected him commonwealth attorney (prosecutor) at the end of the Great Depression, and he served from 1939 to 1947. Thompson served as Abingdon's city attorney from 1940 to 1957.

== Federal judicial service ==
President Dwight D. Eisenhower nominated Thompson on August 16, 1957, to a seat on the United States District Court for the Western District of Virginia vacated by Judge Alfred D. Barksdale, who was deeply disturbed by Massive Resistance. He was confirmed by the United States Senate on August 28, 1957, and received his commission on August 30, 1957. He served as Chief Judge from 1958 to 1960. His service was terminated on July 29, 1960, due to his death in Abingdon.

=== Notable cases ===
Along with his colleague Theodore Roosevelt Dalton and Senior Judge John Paul Jr., Thompson presided over school integration cases in Western Virginia, implementing the Supreme Court's decision in Brown v. Board of Education. Thompson ordered the integration of the public schools in Floyd County, Virginia and Galax, Virginia in 1959 and Pulaski County, Virginia in 1960, noting that more than five years had passed since the Brown decision.

== Personal life ==
He married Mary Davis Geurrant (1906-2000) of Florida, who bore two sons and two daughters and outlived him by decades.

== Death and legacy ==
Thompson died in Charlottesville, Albemarle County, Virginia, survived by his mother as well as his wife and sons. He is buried at Knollkreg memorial park in Abingdon.

== Sources ==
Legal offices
Preceded by Alfred D. Barksdale	Judge of the United States District Court for the Western District of Virginia; 1957–1960	Succeeded by Thomas J. Michie
Preceded by John Paul Jr.	Chief Judge of the United States District Court for the Western District of Virginia; 1958–1960	Succeeded by Theodore Roosevelt Dalton
