= John L. Brownlee =

American lawyer

John Brownlee

United States Attorney for the Western District of Virginia
- In office October 12, 2001 – May 16, 2008
- Appointed by: George W. Bush
- Preceded by: Robert P. Crouch, Jr.
- Succeeded by: Tim Heaphy

Personal details
- Born: John Leslie Brownlee; January 31, 1965 (age 61)
- Party: Republican
- Spouse: Lee Ann Necessary
- Parents: Les Brownlee (father); Nancy Long (mother)
- Education: James Madison University; Washington & Lee University (BS); College of William & Mary (JD)
- Profession: Attorney

Military service
- Allegiance: United States
- Branch/service: United States Army
- Years of service: 1987–1991; 1997–2007
- Rank: Major
- Unit: Infantry Branch; J.A.G. Corps

John Leslie Brownlee is an American lawyer. He was the United States Attorney for the Western District of Virginia from 2001 to 2008.

== United States attorney ==
=== Investigation of Purdue Pharma ===
In a case against Purdue Pharma, under pressure from Purdue lawyer Rudy Giuliani, Brownlee agreed to modify the prosecution so that Purdue Pharma's holding company, Purdue Frederick, would plead to a single misbranding charge so that Purdue Pharma would not have a criminal conviction on their name, which would prevent them from doing business with the U.S. Government. Brownlee also gave Purdue Pharma immunity from further prosecution up to and for future offenses after this plea deal, continuing until 2007.

Despite this outcome, on July 31, 2007, Brownlee testified before the U.S. Senate Judiciary Committee regarding his investigation of Purdue and its executives." Ben Cardin stated that Brownlee's work "will have a major impact on corporate conduct in our country."

=== National security investigation ===
In March 2007, after a six-year investigation, ITT Corporation, the 12th largest supplier of sophisticated defense systems to the United States military, pleaded guilty to violating the International Traffic in Arms Regulations (ITAR). ITT was convicted of illegally transferring classified and controlled night vision technology to foreign countries, including China, and agreed to pay $100 million in penalties. Brownlee was the first federal prosecutor to convict a major defense contractor of violating the ITAR.

The investigation and prosecution of ITT Corporation created important industry reaction. Global Watch, a web based Newsletter of the International Import-Export Institute called the convictions "record breaking" and "precedent setting" and claimed that Brownlee's work would have a "significant long-term impact on the trade compliance community worldwide." The Wall Street Journal wrote that Brownlee's "ITT case is bound to send shivers through the U.S. defense industry, which increasingly views international trade as vital for long-term growth."

=== Use of the Violence Against Women Act ===
In 2005, Brownlee charged Brent Simmons with two counts of using a firearm during the commission of the violent crime of interstate stalking, made criminal by the 1996 Violence Against Women Act. After a 2-week trial in February 2005, the jury convicted Simmons of the two murders but was unable to reach a unanimous decision on the death penalty. Simmons was immediately sentenced by the trial court to life in prison without the possibility of parole.

=== First federal death penalty verdict in Western District of Virginia ===
In 2007, Brownlee and Assistant U.S. Attorney Tony Giorno prosecuted a federal inmate for committing a violent prison murder. The jury imposed the death penalty, the first federal death penalty conviction in the Western District of Virginia.

=== United States v. Frank Cassell ===
On November 2, 2006, a federal Grand Jury charged 20 defendants for their roles in a racketeering conspiracy that included the distribution of illegal drugs, theft of drugs and firearms under the custody of the Henry County Sheriff's Office, money laundering, and obstruction of justice. Thirteen of the twenty defendants were current or former employees of the Henry County, Virginia Sheriff's Office. Eighteen of the defendants, including the sheriff, were convicted of felony offenses, and two were placed on pre-trial diversion.

=== United States v. Carl B. Hutcherson ===
In May 2005, Carl B. Hutcherson, the mayor of Lynchburg, Virginia, was convicted of defrauding two social security disability recipients and a charitable organization, making false statements to bank officials and federal investigators and obstruction of justice.

=== Dismissal during U.S. attorneys controversy ===
Brownlee was included on the list of the second set of U.S. attorneys who were fired in 2006. He testified before the Senate that his placement on the list was related to his refusal of a request by his superiors at the DOJ to delay settlement of the Purdue Pharma case in 2006. Ultimately, he was not dismissed.

== Later life ==
=== 2009 election ===
In 2008, Brownlee announced that he was running for Attorney General of Virginia. At the May 30, 2009, Republican Convention, he yielded the nomination to Ken Cuccinelli.

=== Private practice ===
On July 17, 2013, it was announced that Brownlee had been retained to represent Virginia Governor and former fellow JAG Corps officer Robert F. McDonnell, with regard to a federal Grand Jury investigation.

== See also ==
- Virginia Attorney General Race, 2009
