= John Fishwick =

John P. Fishwick

Personal details
- Born: John Palmer Fishwick; September 29, 1916 Roanoke, Virginia, U.S.
- Died: August 9, 2010 (aged 93)
- Party: Democratic
- Spouse: Blair Wiley
- Children: John P. Fishwick, Jr.
- Education: Roanoke College (B.A.); Harvard University (J.D.)
- Occupation: Attorney, Businessperson

Military service
- Allegiance: United States
- Branch/service: United States Navy
- Years of service: 1942–1945
- Rank: Lieutenant Commander

John Palmer Fishwick (September 29, 1916 – August 9, 2010) was an American railroad executive and chief executive of Norfolk and Western Railway.

Born in Roanoke, Virginia, John was a graduate of Jefferson High School in downtown. He was one of four children, having two sisters and one brother, noted literary scholar and author, Marshall Fishwick. Fishwick attended Roanoke College, where he was a member of Kappa Alpha Order and was editor of the College's newspaper. He graduated in 1937 with a major in English and a minor in economics. Fishwick furthered his education at Harvard Law School, graduating in 1940. After completing law school he worked as an associate with Cravath, Swaine & Moore before joining the Navy in 1942. Fishwick left the United States Navy as a lieutenant commander. After World War II he joined Norfolk and Western in November 1945 and worked as assistant to the general counsel. In 1947, he was promoted to assistant general solicitor, and in 1951 he was promoted to assistant general counsel. In 1954, he was promoted yet again, this time to general solicitor. He was general counsel until his promotion to chief executive in 1970.

He was chief executive of Norfolk and Western from 1970 to 1981, playing a key role in the merger with Southern Railway that formed Norfolk Southern Railway. Following his retirement, he was a partner at Windels Marx Lane & Mittendorf until 1986.

Fishwick's wife, Blair, was a fellow Roanoke College graduate. They had three children together and she was a well known artist in the Roanoke area. She died in June, 1987. Mr. Fishwick married Doreen Hamilton in 1989. Fishwick's son, John Fishwick, Jr., was U.S. Attorney and a lawyer in Roanoke.

On July 16, 2018 the Roanoke City School Board announced that Stonewall Jackson Middle School in Roanoke, VA would be renamed John P. Fishwick Middle School.
