= Elizabeth K. Dillon =

American judge (born 1960)

Elizabeth Dillon
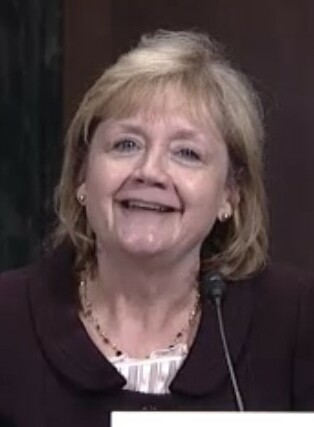
- Dillon in 2014

Chief Judge of the United States District Court for the Western District of Virginia
- Incumbent
- Assumed office July 4, 2024
- Preceded by: Michael F. Urbanski

Judge of the United States District Court for the Western District of Virginia
- Incumbent
- Assumed office December 19, 2014
- Appointed by: Barack Obama
- Preceded by: Samuel Grayson Wilson

Personal details
- Born: Elizabeth Kay Hillman; December 14, 1960 (age 65) Omaha, Nebraska, U.S.
- Education: Lenoir-Rhyne University (BA); Wake Forest University (JD)

Elizabeth Kay Dillon (née Hillman; born December 14, 1960) is the chief United States district judge of the United States District Court for the Western District of Virginia.

== Biography ==
Dillon received an Artium Baccalaureus degree, magna cum laude, in 1983 from Lenoir–Rhyne University. She received a Juris Doctor in 1986 from Wake Forest University School of Law. She began her legal career at Woods, Rogers & Hazlegrove, PLC, from 1986 to 1998. From 1999 to 2000, she was a shareholder at Guynn & Dillon, PC, a predecessor to her later law firm. From 2000 to 2003, she worked as an assistant city attorney for the City of Roanoke. From 2003 to 2014, she had been a shareholder at Guynn, Memmer & Dillon, PC, where she handled both trial and appellate matters in federal and state courts.

=== Federal judicial service ===
On September 18, 2014, President Barack Obama nominated Dillon to serve as a United States district judge of the United States District Court for the Western District of Virginia, to the seat vacated by Judge Samuel Grayson Wilson, who retired on July 31, 2014. She received a hearing before the United States Senate Committee on the Judiciary on November 13, 2014. On December 11, 2014, her nomination was reported out of committee by voice vote. On December 13, 2014 Senate Majority Leader Harry Reid filed a motion to invoke cloture on the nomination. On December 16, 2014, Reid withdrew his cloture motion on Dillon's nomination, and the Senate proceeded to vote to confirm Dillon by voice vote. She received her federal judicial commission on December 19, 2014. She became the chief judge on July 4, 2024, after Michael F. Urbanski assumed senior status.

=== Mountain Valley Pipeline ===
Dillon has been criticized for several decisions surrounding the Mountain Valley Pipeline in Southwest Virginia. On May 4, 2018, Dillon found 61 year old Theresa 'Red' Terry in contempt of court for protesting the pipeline while on her own land, threatening a $1,000/day fine and use of U.S. Marshals to forcibly remove her. The land has been in Terry's family for 7 generations On May 16, 2018, Dillon found two farmers in contempt of court for encouraging a tree sit on their property.

Legal offices
Preceded by Samuel Grayson Wilson	Judge of the United States District Court for the Western District of Virginia; 2014–present	Incumbent
Preceded by Michael F. Urbanski	Chief Judge of the United States District Court for the Western District of Virginia; 2024–present	Incumbent
