= Norman K. Moon =

American judge (born 1936)

Senior Judge of the United States District Court for the Western District of Virginia
- Incumbent
- Assumed office July 1, 2010

Judge of the United States District Court for the Western District of Virginia
- In office November 7, 1997 – July 1, 2010
- Appointed by: Bill Clinton
- Preceded by: Jackson L. Kiser
- Succeeded by: Michael F. Urbanski

Personal details
- Born: Norman Kenneth Moon; November 4, 1936 (age 89) Lynchburg, Virginia, U.S.
- Education: University of Virginia (BA, JD, LLM)

Norman Kenneth Moon (born November 4, 1936) is an American lawyer who has served as a senior United States district judge of the United States District Court for the Western District of Virginia.

== Education and career ==
Moon was born in Lynchburg, Virginia. He received a Bachelor of Arts from the University of Virginia in 1959 and his Juris Doctor from the University of Virginia School of Law in 1962. He was in private practice in Lynchburg from 1962 to 1974. He was a judge on the Twenty-fourth Judicial Circuit of Virginia from 1974 to 1985, serving as Chief Judge from 1983 to 1984. He was a judge on the Court of Appeals of Virginia from 1985 to 1997, serving as Chief Judge from 1993 to 1997. He received a Master of Laws from the University of Virginia School of Law in 1988.

=== Federal judicial service ===
On October 8, 1997, Moon was nominated by President Bill Clinton to a seat on the United States District Court for the Western District of Virginia vacated by Judge Jackson L. Kiser. Moon was confirmed by the United States Senate on November 7, 1997, and received his commission on November 12, 1997. He took senior status on July 1, 2010.

==== Notable decisions ====
- In May 2019, Moon rejected constitutional challenges to the Anti-Riot Act by accused Rise Above Movement rioters and accepted their conditional guilty pleas for criminal offenses at the 2017 Unite the Right rally. In August 2020, Moon's judgment was affirmed by the unanimous United States Court of Appeals for the Fourth Circuit.
- In 2022 he dismissed the lawsuit brought by former Charlottesville police chief Rashall Brackney alleging racism had forced her out of her position.
- In 2023 he reduced the $24 million punitive damages settlement against Unite the Right demonstrators to $350,000. The law requires that jurors not be told of the $350,000 maximum, but that any amount demanded over that be reduced to $350,000.
- In 2023 he dismissed the lawsuit brought by Jason Kessler following the Unite The Right rally in Charlottesville.

Legal offices
Preceded by Jackson L. Kiser	Judge of the United States District Court for the Western District of Virginia; 1997–2010	Succeeded by Michael F. Urbanski
