= Thomas T. Cullen =

American judge (born 1977)

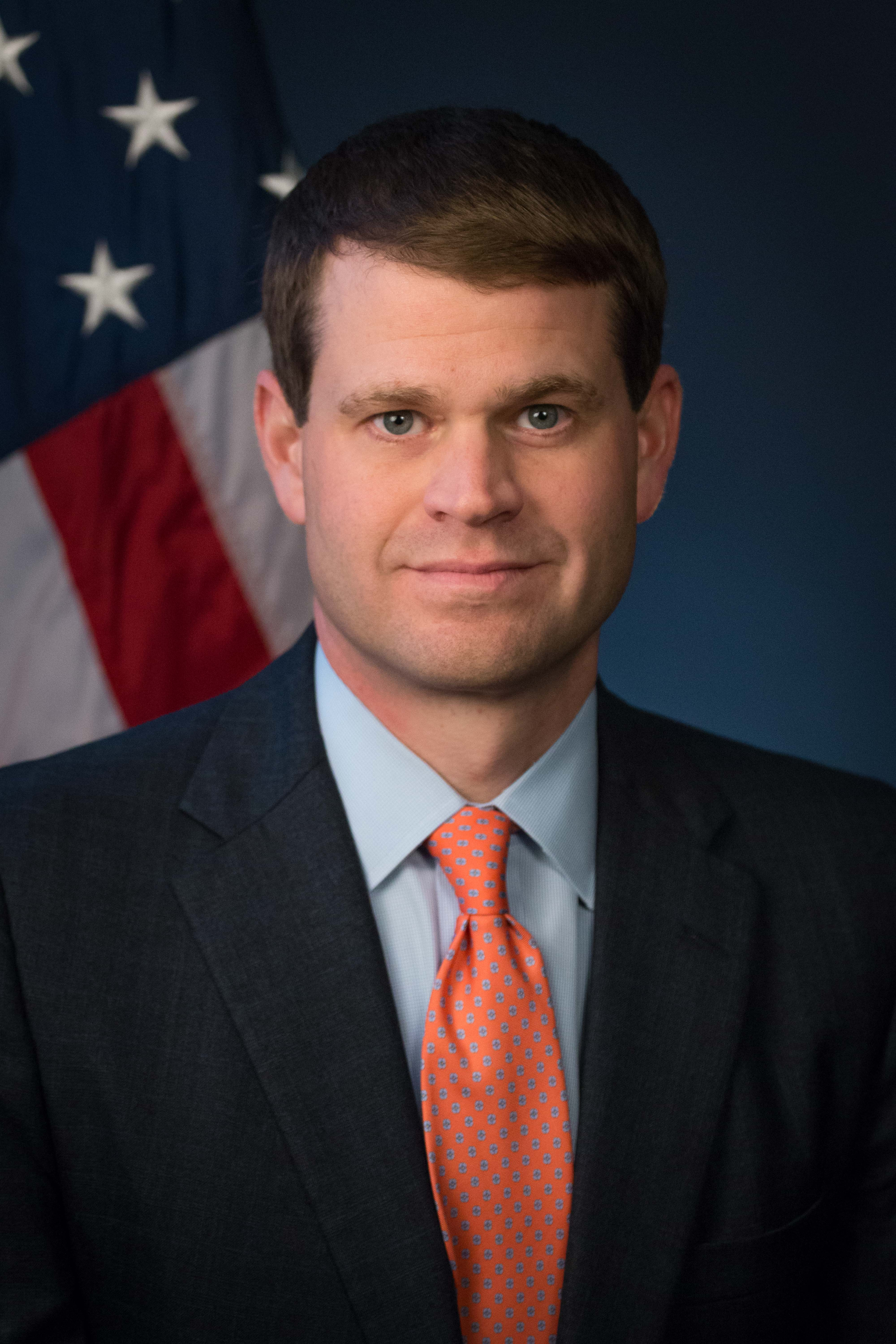

Judge of the United States District Court for the Western District of Virginia
- Incumbent
- Assumed office September 15, 2020
- Appointed by: Donald Trump
- Preceded by: Glen E. Conrad

United States Attorney for the Western District of Virginia
- In office March 30, 2018 – September 15, 2020
- President: Donald Trump
- Preceded by: John P. Fishwick Jr.
- Succeeded by: Christopher R. Kavanaugh

Personal details
- Born: 1977 (age 48–49) Richmond, Virginia, U.S.
- Parent: Richard Cullen (father)
- Education: Furman University (BA); College of William & Mary (JD)

Thomas Tullidge Cullen (born 1977) is an American attorney who has served as a United States district judge of the United States District Court for the Western District of Virginia since 2020. He served as a United States attorney for the same district from 2018 to 2020.

== Education and legal career ==
Cullen is a 1996 graduate of Collegiate School in Richmond, Virginia. He attended Furman University, where he was a four-year member of its Division I Track and Field team, and received his Bachelor of Arts cum laude in 2000. He received his Juris Doctor from the William & Mary School of Law in 2004, where he was inducted into the Order of the Coif. He was a law clerk to Judge Robert E. Payne of the United States District Court for the Eastern District of Virginia from 2004 to 2005 and for Judge Roger Gregory of the United States Court of Appeals for the Fourth Circuit from 2005 to 2006.

Cullen served as an assistant United States attorney for the Western District of North Carolina from 2006 to 2010 and for the Western District of Virginia from 2010 to 2013, where he was Deputy Criminal Chief. Before becoming U.S. Attorney, he was a principal/partner at Woods Rogers PLC in Roanoke, Virginia, from 2013 to 2018, representing clients in complex civil and criminal litigation.

=== U.S. Attorney ===
Cullen was recommended as a candidate for United States attorney by Virginia Senators Mark Warner and Tim Kaine. On March 22, 2018, his nomination was reported out of committee by voice vote. He was confirmed by voice vote later the same day. He was sworn in on March 30, 2018. As U.S. Attorney, Cullen directed the federal response to the deadly "Unite the Right" rally in Charlottesville, Virginia, successfully prosecuting several white supremacists who committed hate crimes and other acts of violence. His tenure as U.S. Attorney ended on September 15, 2020, when he became a federal district judge.

=== Federal judicial service ===
On December 18, 2019, President Donald Trump announced his intent to nominate Cullen to serve as a United States district judge of the United States District Court for the Western District of Virginia. The ABA Standing Committee on the Federal Judiciary rated Cullen as a "well-qualified" nominee, its highest possible rating. On February 4, 2020, his nomination was sent to the Senate. President Trump nominated Cullen to the seat vacated by Judge Glen E. Conrad, who assumed senior status on December 11, 2017. On March 4, 2020, a hearing on his nomination was held before the Senate Judiciary Committee. On May 14, 2020, his nomination was reported out of committee by a 17–5 vote. On September 9, 2020, the United States Senate invoked cloture on his nomination by a 77–18 vote. On September 10, 2020, his nomination was confirmed by a 79–19 vote. He received his judicial commission on September 15, 2020.

=== Notable rulings ===
In July 2025, the chief judge of the United States Court of Appeals for the Fourth Circuit appointed Cullen to preside over United States v. Russell, et al., the Trump administration's lawsuit against all of the active and semi-retired federal district judges in Maryland. On August 26, 2025, Cullen issued a 39-page opinion dismissing the case in favor of the judges. He concluded that the administration's suit violated the separation of powers, was prohibited by the doctrine of judicial immunity, and was not otherwise authorized by law. Cullen also cited numerous instances in which administration officials had publicly criticized federal judges, noting that "[a]lthough some tension between the coordinate branches of government is the hallmark of our constitutional system, this concerted effort by the Executive to smear and impugn individual judges who rule against it is both unprecedented and unfortunate."

== Book ==
In 2025, Cullen's debut novel, Charlie-Man, was published.

== Awards and honors ==
In 2022, Cullen was named a trustee at his alma mater, Furman University.

In 2024, he was named the Carter O. Lowance Fellow at William & Mary Law School.

In 2024, Furman University awarded Cullen an honorary doctorate in law.

== Personal life ==
His father is former Attorney General of Virginia Richard Cullen.

Legal offices
Preceded by John P. Fishwick Jr.	United States Attorney for the Western District of Virginia; 2018–2020	Succeeded by Christopher R. Kavanaugh
Preceded by Glen E. Conrad	Judge of the United States District Court for the Western District of Virginia; 2020–present	Incumbent
