= Timothy J. Heaphy =

American lawyer

Timothy Heaphy
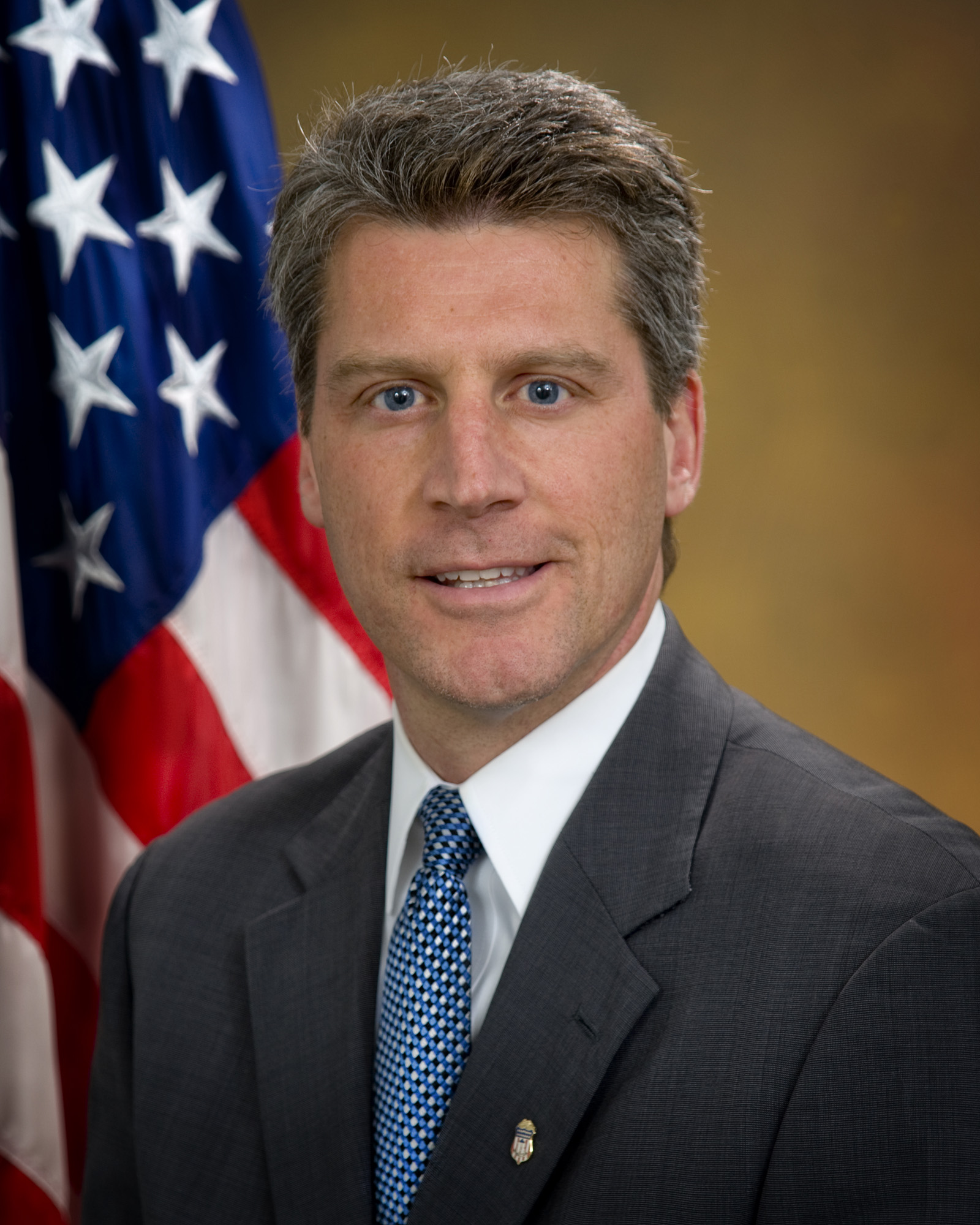

United States Attorney for the Western District of Virginia
- In office December 4, 2009 – January 1, 2015
- President: Barack Obama
- Preceded by: John L. Brownlee
- Succeeded by: John P. Fishwick Jr.

Personal details
- Born: 1964 (age 61–62) New Haven, Connecticut, U.S.
- Party: Democratic
- Education: University of Virginia (BA, JD)

Timothy J. Heaphy (born 1964) is a white-collar criminal defense attorney, law professor and a former United States attorney for the Western District of Virginia. He served as the lead investigator for the House Select Committee on the January 6 Attack.

== Education and early career ==
Heaphy was raised in a Maryland suburb of Washington D.C. He attended college at the University of Virginia where he played football. He is married to Lori Shinseki, the daughter of Eric Shinseki.

After graduating from the University of Virginia in 1986, Heaphy taught at a private school for a year and then joined the staff of Senator Joe Biden (D-Del.) He returned to Charlottesville, Virginia in 1988 to attend law school, graduating in 1991.

Heaphy was a law clerk to Judge John A. Terry of the District of Columbia Court of Appeals before joining the law firm of Morrison & Foerster in San Francisco.

== Federal career ==
Following a two-year stint at Morrison & Foerster, Heaphy joined the U.S. Attorney's Office for the District of Columbia.

In 2003, Heaphy joined the U.S. Attorney’s Office in the Western District of Virginia based in Charlottesville, Virginia. After three years, Heaphy returned to private practice, serving as a partner with the law firm of McGuireWoods. In 2009, Heaphy was nominated by President Barack Obama to become the United States attorney for the Western District of Virginia, assuming that post on December 11, 2009.

== Return to private practice ==
He left the U.S. Attorney's office in December 2014 to join Hunton & Williams.

In 2016, Heaphy founded a nonprofit organization that provides low-interest loans to formerly incarcerated persons, The Fountain Fund.

In 2017, Heaphy authored a report, commissioned by the city of Charlottesville, on its handling of the August 2017 Unite the Right rally.

Heaphy served as an assistant Virginia attorney general and as counsel for the University of Virginia before taking a leave of absence from both positions in August 2021 after being appointed as chief investigative counsel for the United States House Select Committee on the January 6 Attack. He was fired as university counsel while on leave from that position by Virginia's new Republican Attorney General Jason Miyares in January 2022.

== Awards ==
In 2003, The National Law Journal named Heaphy one of its 40 Important Lawyers Under 40.
