= Theodore Roosevelt Dalton =

American judge

Ted Dalton
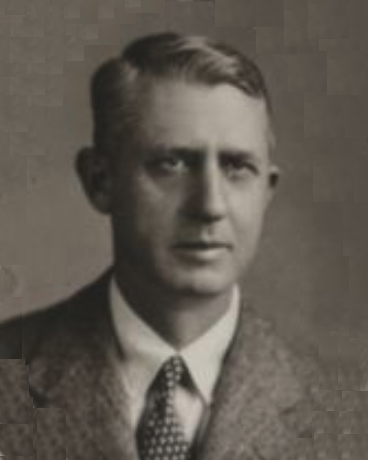

Senior Judge of the United States District Court for the Western District of Virginia
- In office October 12, 1976 – October 30, 1989

Chief Judge of the United States District Court for the Western District of Virginia
- In office 1960–1971
- Preceded by: Roby C. Thompson
- Succeeded by: Hiram Emory Widener Jr.

Judge of United States District Court for the Western District of Virginia
- In office August 13, 1959 – October 12, 1976
- Appointed by: Dwight D. Eisenhower
- Preceded by: John Paul Jr.
- Succeeded by: Glen Morgan Williams

Member of the Virginia Senate from the 21st district
- In office February 1944 – July 21, 1959
- Preceded by: Harvey B. Apperson
- Succeeded by: James Clinton Turk

Personal details
- Born: Theodore Roosevelt Dalton; July 3, 1901 Carroll County, Virginia, U.S.
- Died: October 30, 1989 (aged 88) Radford, Virginia, U.S.
- Party: Republican
- Children: John N. Dalton
- Education: College of William & Mary (BA, LLB)

Theodore Roosevelt Dalton (July 3, 1901 – October 30, 1989) was an American attorney and a United States district judge for the United States District Court for the Western District of Virginia. He was known as Virginia's "Mr. Republican."

== Education and career ==
Born on July 3, 1901 in Carroll County, Virginia, Dalton received an Artium Baccalaureus degree in 1924 from the College of William & Mary and a Bachelor of Laws in 1926 from William & Mary Law School. He entered private practice in Radford, Virginia from 1926 to 1959. His law partners included Richard Harding Poff and James Clinton Turk. In later years both, Poff and Dalton were mentioned as potential nominees to the Supreme Court of the United States, and Turk later became a federal judge as well. Dalton was Commonwealth's Attorney in Radford from 1928 to 1936. He was a member of the Senate of Virginia from 1944 to 1959.

== Political career ==
Dalton won his first Virginia Senate election as a write-in candidate in 1944 and became the leading Republican in Virginia during his fifteen years as a member of the Senate of Virginia. Senator Dalton ran unsuccessfully as the Republican candidate for Governor of Virginia in 1953 and 1957, in opposition to the fading but still dominant Democratic Byrd Organization led by United States Senator Harry F. Byrd. Both times Dalton proposed to abolish the poll tax. Dalton's first campaign was the high point of what appeared to be a new era for the Republican Party in Virginia. In the federal elections of 1952, three Virginia Republicans, including Dalton's old law partner Poff, were elected to Congress, and Dwight D. Eisenhower carried Virginia in the presidential election. In 1953, against Democrat Thomas Bahnson Stanley and Independent Howard Carwile, Dalton garnered 45 percent of the vote. His running mates in that election were both lawyers: Stephen Timberlake of Staunton as the candidate for lieutenant governor and Walter Edward Hoffman of Norfolk (another future federal judge) for Attorney General. Public finance for transportation proved a crucial issue, as Senator Byrd took back his promise to his friend Dalton not to intervene, after Dalton proposed road bonds at odds with Byrd's doctrine of "pay as you go."

School desegregation seemed the major issue in the 1957 election (in the wake of the 1954 and 1955 decisions in Brown v. Board of Education), and Dalton lost badly to Democrat J. Lindsay Almond. By 1956, Byrd Democrats including Almond had responded with "Massive Resistance", vowing to close schools to avoid integration. Passage of the Civil Rights Act of 1957 and efforts by the federal government to enforce desegregation in Little Rock Central High School were used against Republicans, and led to the widened margin of defeat for Dalton in his second statewide campaign. Dalton had criticized the Brown decisions, and proposed a pupil placement plan that would allow most schools to remain segregated "for maybe a hundred years." He also wrote to President Eisenhower, urging withdrawal of the troops from Little Rock, Arkansas. Nonetheless, Dalton managed just 36.5 percent of the vote. When Senator Byrd announced retirement plans in 1958, Senator Dalton cast the only vote in the General Assembly against a resolution urging Byrd to run again, which Byrd did.

Governor Mills E. Godwin Jr. selected Dalton to serve on the Virginia Commission for Constitutional Revision, the efforts of which led to the Virginia Constitution of 1971. Lewis F. Powell Jr., Oliver Hill, and former governors Albertis Harrison and Colgate Darden also served on that commission.

== Federal judicial service ==
Dalton was nominated by President Dwight D. Eisenhower on July 21, 1959 to a seat on the United States District Court for the Western District of Virginia vacated by Judge John Paul Jr., who took senior status and continued to sit on 3-judge panels required of desegregation decisions. The United States Senate confirmed Dalton's judicial appointment on August 12, 1959 and he received his commission on August 13, 1959. Dalton served as Chief Judge from 1960 to 1971, and assumed senior status on October 12, 1976. President Gerald Ford nominated Glen Morgan Williams as Dalton's successor, after Senator William L. Scott derailed the nomination of the President's first choice. Dalton's service terminated on October 30, 1989 due to his death in Radford.

=== Notable cases ===
Along with his colleagues, Dalton as federal judge presided over litigation that continued into the 1970s to implement the Brown decision in Virginia's public schools. Dalton ordered the desegregation plan for the public schools in Roanoke, Virginia, which ultimately led to the conversion of the Lucy Addison High School (for African Americans) into a desegregated middle school.

Dalton served on the three-judge panel in a case rejecting a constitutional challenge to Virginia's method of distributing state money for education to the various school districts across the state.

== Family ==
Dalton was born in Carroll County, Virginia to parents Currell Dalton (November 4, 1866 – November 29, 1919) and Loduska Vernon Martin (December 10, 1869 – 1920). His wife, Mary Turner, died September 1988. Dalton's grandmother Clarissa Goad Dalton (August 18, 1841 – February 28, 1907) was related to Dexter Goad (November 5, 1867 – July 1, 1939), the Republican clerk of court in Carroll County at the time of the courthouse shootings following the conviction of Floyd Allen in March 1912. Dalton's nephew whom he had adopted as his son, John Nichols Dalton, was elected as a Republican as Governor of Virginia in 1977. Their next-door neighbor in Radford was Charlotte Giesen, who became the first Republican woman elected to the House of Delegates in 1957.

== Honors ==
In 1968, Dalton was selected as an honorary member of the Order of the Coif of the law school of Washington and Lee University. Dalton also received an honorary doctorate of laws degree from the College of William & Mary in 1972.

== Death and legacy ==
Dalton died at Radford Community Hospital of complications from pneumonia. He outlived his son, John Dalton, by some three years. Dalton's former law clerks included Glen E. Conrad, who in 2003 succeeded United States District Judge Glen Williams on the United States District Court for the Western District of Virginia, but whose nomination to the United States Court of Appeals for the Fourth Circuit lapsed at the end of the term of President George W. Bush.

Dalton's personal papers are held by the Special Collections Research Center at the College of William & Mary.

Senate of Virginia
Preceded by Harvey B. Apperson	Virginia Senator for the 21st District; 1944–1959	Succeeded by James Clinton Turk
Party political offices
Preceded by Walter Johnson	Republican nominee for Governor of Virginia; 1953, 1957	Succeeded by H. Clyde Pearson
Legal offices
Preceded by John Paul Jr.	Judge of the United States District Court for the Western District of Virginia; 1959–1976	Succeeded by Glen Morgan Williams
Preceded by Roby C. Thompson	Chief Judge of the United States District Court for the Western District of Virginia; 1960–1971	Succeeded by Hiram Emory Widener Jr.
