= Glen E. Conrad =

American judge (1949–2021)

Senior Judge of the United States District Court for the Western District of Virginia
- In office December 11, 2017 – May 20, 2021

Chief Judge of the United States District Court for the Western District of Virginia
- In office 2010 – July 2, 2017
- Preceded by: James Parker Jones
- Succeeded by: Michael F. Urbanski

Judge of the United States District Court for the Western District of Virginia
- In office September 24, 2003 – December 11, 2017
- Appointed by: George W. Bush
- Preceded by: James Clinton Turk
- Succeeded by: Thomas T. Cullen

Magistrate Judge of the United States District Court for the Western District of Virginia
- In office 1976–2003

Personal details
- Born: Glen Edward Conrad; June 29, 1949 Radford, Virginia, U.S.
- Died: May 20, 2021 (aged 71)
- Education: College of William & Mary (BA, JD)

Glen Edward Conrad (June 29, 1949 – May 20, 2021) was a United States district judge of the United States District Court for the Western District of Virginia and a former federal judicial nominee to the United States Court of Appeals for the Fourth Circuit.

== Background ==
Born and raised in Radford, Virginia, Conrad was the son of an elementary school teacher mother and a father who worked in the post office. Conrad earned a Bachelor of Arts degree from the College of William & Mary in 1971, where he wrote his senior thesis on the Republican Party. While writing that thesis, Conrad met James Clinton Turk, the federal district judge whom he eventually would succeed on the United States District Court for the Western District of Virginia. Conrad then earned a Juris Doctor from the College of William and Mary's Marshall-Wythe School of Law in 1974. Conrad's first job was as an interpreter/host at Colonial Williamsburg in 1974. He then worked as a United States probation officer for the Western District of Virginia from 1975 until 1976. In 1976, Conrad became a United States magistrate judge of the United States District Court for the Western District of Virginia. He served in that capacity until 2003. Conrad applied for a federal judgeship in 1990.

== Federal judicial service ==
On April 28, 2003, President George W. Bush nominated Conrad to become a United States District Judge of the United States District Court for the Western District of Virginia. "I felt like I had done just about all I could do with the responsibilities I had," Conrad told the Roanoke Times. The United States Senate confirmed Conrad on September 22, 2003 by an 89–0 vote. Conrad received his commission on September 24, 2003. He served as Chief Judge from 2010–2017. He assumed senior status on December 11, 2017.

== Fourth Circuit nomination under Bush ==
On May 8, 2008, President George W. Bush nominated Conrad to the United States Court of Appeals for the Fourth Circuit, to fill the seat of Hiram Emory Widener Jr., who assumed senior status in July 2007 (Widener died in September 2007). Bush had previously nominated William J. Haynes II and E. Duncan Getchell, but both nominations failed after opposition from Democrats and some Republicans. Conrad's nomination to the Fourth Circuit expired upon the end of President Bush's presidency in January 2009.

== Notable cases ==
In February 2017, Conrad found that the Eighth Amendment to the United States Constitution did not prevent Virginia from criminally prohibiting those it identified as "habitual drunkards" from possessing alcohol. His judgment was ultimately reversed by the Fourth Circuit sitting en banc.

In August 2017, Conrad was involved in a case related to the far-right Unite the Right rally. The city of Charlottesville had attempted to prevent the organizers from holding the rally in Emancipation Park, and instead move them to McIntire Park based on their opinion that the larger space would allow for better separation of the two groups while still allowing for the rally to be held. Conrad granted an injunction due to several factors; Emancipation Park was the location for the statue of Robert Lee that was planned to be taken down, that resources would be needed at both parks for both the rally and the counterprotestors, and that the move to McIntire Park was due to the viewpoints of the organizer and not the safety of the public.

== Personal life ==
Conrad's wife, Mary Ann, is active in the Republican Party. Conrad died on May 20, 2021, aged 71.

== Sources ==
Legal offices
Preceded by James Clinton Turk	Judge of the United States District Court for the Western District of Virginia; 2003–2017	Succeeded by Thomas T. Cullen
Preceded by James Parker Jones	Chief Judge of the United States District Court for the Western District of Virginia; 2010–2017	Succeeded by Michael F. Urbanski
