= Hiram Emory Widener Jr. =

American judge (1923–2007)

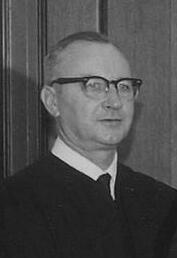
- Widener in 1973

Senior Judge of the United States Court of Appeals for the Fourth Circuit
- In office July 17, 2007 – September 19, 2007

Judge of the United States Court of Appeals for the Fourth Circuit
- In office October 17, 1972 – July 17, 2007
- Appointed by: Richard Nixon
- Preceded by: Albert Vickers Bryan
- Succeeded by: Barbara Milano Keenan

Chief Judge of the United States District Court for the Western District of Virginia
- In office 1971–1972
- Preceded by: Theodore Roosevelt Dalton
- Succeeded by: James Clinton Turk

Judge of the United States District Court for the Western District of Virginia
- In office July 14, 1969 – October 27, 1972
- Appointed by: Richard Nixon
- Preceded by: Seat established by 71 Stat. 586
- Succeeded by: James Clinton Turk

Personal details
- Born: Hiram Emory Widener Jr. April 20, 1923 Abingdon, Virginia. U.S.
- Died: September 19, 2007 (aged 84) Abingdon, Virginia, U.S.
- Education: United States Naval Academy (BS); Washington and Lee University; School of Law (LLB)

Hiram Emory Widener Jr. (April 20, 1923 – September 19, 2007) was a United States circuit judge of the United States Court of Appeals for the Fourth Circuit.

== Early life and career ==
Born on April 20, 1923, in Abingdon, Virginia, Widener received a Bachelor of Science degree from the United States Naval Academy in 1944 and then served in the United States Navy until 1949. In 1953 he received a Bachelor of Laws from Washington and Lee University School of Law. He was a Lieutenant in the United States Naval Reserve from 1951 to 1952, and was in private practice in Bristol, Virginia from 1953 to 1969. He was a Commissioner for the United States District Court for the Western District of Virginia from 1963 to 1966, and was a member of the Virginia Election Laws Study Commission from 1968 to 1969.

== Federal judicial service ==
Widener was nominated by President Richard Nixon on June 19, 1969, to the United States District Court for the Western District of Virginia, to a new seat authorized by 71 Stat. 586 following the certification of Thomas J. Michie as disabled. He was confirmed by the United States Senate on July 11, 1969, and received his commission on July 14, 1969. He served as Chief Judge from 1971 to 1972. His service terminated on October 27, 1972, due to his elevation to the Fourth Circuit.

Widener was nominated by President Nixon on September 25, 1972, to a seat on the United States Court of Appeals for the Fourth Circuit vacated by Judge Albert Vickers Bryan. He was confirmed by the Senate on October 12, 1972, and received commission on October 17, 1972. He assumed senior status on July 17, 2007. He was the last federal appeals court judge in active service to have been appointed by President Nixon. His service terminated on September 19, 2007, due to his death.

== Succession controversy ==
Widener announced his intent to take senior status upon confirmation of his successor in 2001. William J. Haynes II had been nominated to succeed Widener but was never given a vote in the Senate. In January 2007, Haynes withdrew his candidacy for nomination to replace Widener on the Fourth Circuit. He had long been opposed by Democrats and a few Republicans, and with the Democrats having regained control of the Senate, his chances for confirmation appeared to have completely vanished. On July 17, 2007, Widener took senior status unconditionally.

== Death ==
Widener died at his home outside Abingdon on September 19, 2007, a year after being diagnosed with lung cancer.

== See also ==
- List of United States federal judges by longevity of service

== Sources ==
- Washington Post obituary

Legal offices
Preceded by Seat established by 71 Stat. 586	Judge of the United States District Court for the Western District of Virginia; 1969–1972	Succeeded by James Clinton Turk
Preceded by Theodore Roosevelt Dalton	Chief Judge of the United States District Court for the Western District of Virginia; 1971–1972	Succeeded by James Clinton Turk
Preceded by Albert Vickers Bryan	Judge of the United States Court of Appeals for the Fourth Circuit; 1972–2007	Succeeded by Barbara Milano Keenan
