= James Clinton Turk =

American judge (1923–2014)

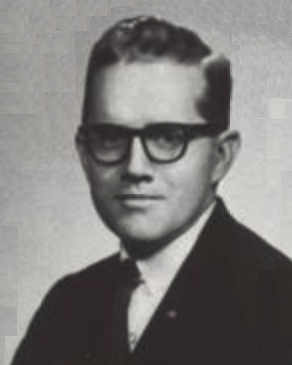

Senior Judge of United States District Court for the Western District of Virginia
- In office November 1, 2002 – July 6, 2014

Chief Judge of the United States District Court for the Western District of Virginia
- In office 1973–1993
- Preceded by: Hiram Emory Widener Jr.
- Succeeded by: Jackson L. Kiser

Judge of United States District Court for the Western District of Virginia
- In office October 17, 1972 – November 1, 2002
- Appointed by: Richard Nixon
- Preceded by: Hiram Emory Widener Jr.
- Succeeded by: Glen E. Conrad

Member of the Virginia Senate
- In office January 13, 1960 – October 1972
- Preceded by: Ted Dalton
- Succeeded by: John N. Dalton
- Constituency: 21st district (1960‍–‍1964); 20th district (1964‍–‍1966); 13th district (1966‍–‍1972); 37th district (1972)

Personal details
- Born: James Clinton Turk; May 3, 1923 Roanoke County, Virginia, U.S.
- Died: July 6, 2014 (aged 91) Radford, Virginia, U.S.
- Party: Republican
- Education: Roanoke College (AB); Washington and Lee University (LLB)

Military service
- Branch/service: United States Army
- Battles/wars: World War II

James Clinton Turk (May 3, 1923 – July 6, 2014) was a Virginia lawyer, state senator and for more than four decades, United States district judge of the United States District Court for the Western District of Virginia.

== Early and family life ==
Born in Roanoke County, Virginia, Turk grew up on a farm near Garden City, Virginia. His parents were a farmer and a schoolteacher; his brother Maynard also became a lawyer. Turk attended a one-room schoolhouse and later William Byrd High School in Vinton, Virginia, graduating in 1939. His first full-time job was with the Norfolk and Western Railroad. During World War II, he was a staff sergeant in the United States Army, from 1943 to 1946, and then served with the United States Army Reserve until the 1960s. Using his GI Bill, Turk received an Artium Baccalaureus degree from Roanoke College in Salem in 1949. He received a Bachelor of Laws from Washington and Lee University School of Law in 1952 (graduating second in his class). He was a member of Phi Beta Kappa, Omicron Delta Kappa and the Order of the Coif. He married Barbara Duncan, and they had five children.

== Political career ==
Turk was in private practice in Radford, Virginia from 1952 to 1972, mostly with the firm of Dalton, Poff & Turk. Voters in Franklin, Montomery and Roanoke Counties and the city of Radford elected Turk to represent them (part-time) in the Virginia State Senate in November 1959. He served until 1972, and was minority leader from 1965 to 1972. However, his district's boundaries and number changed drastically, both as a result of the Massive Resistance controversy engulfing Virginia, as well as reapportionments necessitated by census changes, the Voting Rights Act of 1965 and U.S. Supreme Court decisions (especially Davis v. Mann in 1963). Turk initially replaced fellow Republican Ted Dalton (his law partner) who had represented the same 21st district, and who had become U.S. District Judge for the Western District of Virginia (a position Turk later also secured). Turk also followed Dalton's footsteps in helping to end Massive Resistance and the domination of the Byrd Organization. For the 1963 elections, the district covering the same counties and city was renamed the 20th, and the 21st became what had been the 22nd. The restructuring in the 1965 elections was major: Montgomery and Franklin Counties and the city of Radford were now joined as the 13th district with Carroll and Floyd Counties and the city of Galax (which had been represented as the 14th district by Republican S. Floyd Landreth, who had been the only other Republican in the Senate when Turk began, and who now retired). Restructuring after the 1970 census also proved major: Turk was elected from the 37th district, which included the cities of Radford and Galax, as well as Carroll, Floyd, Grayson and Montgomery Counties. Upon Turk's resignation upon becoming a federal judge, as discussed below, John N. Dalton replaced him.

== Federal judicial service ==
On September 25, 1972, President Richard Nixon nominated Turk to a seat on the United States District Court for the Western District of Virginia vacated by Judge Hiram Emory Widener Jr. The United States Senate confirmed him on October 12, 1972, and he received his commission on October 17, 1972. Turk served as chief judge from 1973 to 1993, and assumed senior status on November 1, 2002, after nearly three decades on the bench. He nonetheless continued to hear many cases, stating in May (shortly before his death) that he was planning to reduce his workload in November. Perhaps his highest profile case involved Rev. Jerry Falwell and Hustler magazine publisher Larry Flynt. Observers noted that his courtesy and folksy demeanor sometimes caused underestimation of his sharp legal mind. Judge Turk's humility was also shown by his practice of always taking a trash bag on his neighborhood walks, in order to clean up after others.

== Death and legacy ==
Turk died on July 6, 2014, in Radford, survived by his wife, five children and many grandchildren. His eldest son Jimmy is a criminal defense attorney in Montgomery County, and his son Bobby Turk became a Montgomery County judge in 2000.

== Sources ==
Legal offices
| Preceded by Hiram Emory Widener Jr. | Judge of the United States District Court for the Western District of Virginia; 1972–2002 | Succeeded by Glen E. Conrad |
| Preceded by Hiram Emory Widener Jr. | Chief Judge of the United States District Court for the Western District of Virginia; 1973–1993 | Succeeded by Jackson L. Kiser |
