= Alfred D. Barksdale =

American judge

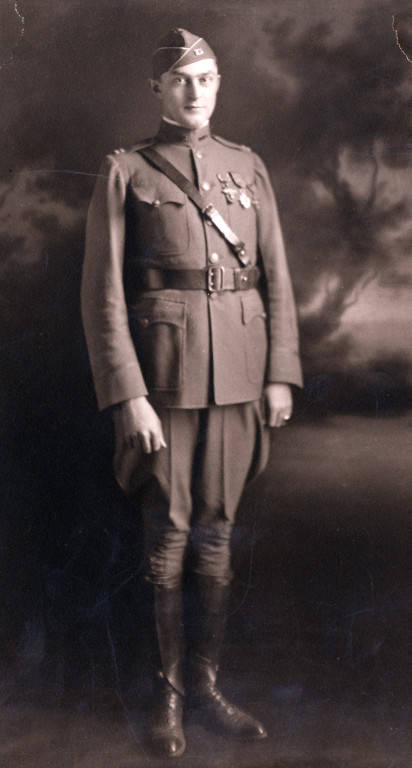
- Barksdale in uniform, 1919

Senior Judge of the United States District Court for the Western District of Virginia
- In office August 1, 1957 – August 16, 1972

Judge of the United States District Court for the Western District of Virginia
- In office December 19, 1939 – August 1, 1957
- Appointed by: Franklin D. Roosevelt
- Preceded by: Armistead Mason Dobie
- Succeeded by: Roby C. Thompson

Member of the Virginia Senate from the 12th district
- In office January 19, 1924 – January 10, 1928
- Preceded by: Robert A. Russell
- Succeeded by: Samuel C. Goggin

Personal details
- Born: Alfred Dickinson Barksdale; July 17, 1892 Houston, Virginia, US
- Died: August 16, 1972 (aged 80) Lynchburg, Virginia, US
- Education: Virginia Military Institute (B.S.); University of Virginia School of Law (LL.B.)

Military service
- Allegiance: United States
- Branch/service: United States Army
- Years of service: 1916–1922
- Rank: Captain
- Unit: 116th Infantry Regiment of the 29th Infantry Division
- Battles/wars: World War I
- Awards: Distinguished Service Cross; Croix de Guerre; Chevalier Legion of Honor

Alfred Dickinson Barksdale (July 17, 1892 – August 16, 1972), frequently known as A. D. Barksdale, was an American soldier, Virginia lawyer, state senator, state court judge, and a United States district judge of the United States District Court for the Western District of Virginia.

== Early family life and education ==
Born at "Giant Poplars" in Houston, Halifax County, Virginia to the former Hallie Bailey Craddock, and her husband, William P. Barksdale Sr. His paternal grandfather, Elisha Barksdale (1812–1887), had represented Halifax County in the Virginia House of Delegates for one term during the final years of the Civil War (1863-5), after purchasing the Union Iron Works with partners Jonathan B. Stovall and John P Barksdale in 1862. Though too young to enlist in the Confederate Army, as a militia cadet William Barksdale fought at the Battle of Staunton River Bridge in 1864 before receiving his degrees and becoming a Virginia lawyer, state senator for Halifax County (part time) and South Boston bank president during this boy's childhood (1897-1905), then circuit judge (initially perhaps the youngest at age 24, but elected to successive terms until his death in 1925). Albert Barksdale's mother died in 1900, but he had four elder brothers, one younger brother and four older sisters, and his father remarried. One brother become a surgeon in Lynchburg, another a Richmond Bank president and one of his sisters was supervisor of elementary education and Sunday school superintendent in Halifax County. Educated at the local public schools and the Cluster Springs Academy, Barksdale received his college education in Lexington, Virginia, graduating with a Bachelor of Science degree from Virginia Military Institute in 1911 at the age of 18. Barksdale then earned a Bachelor of Laws from the University of Virginia School of Law, where he was president of his class, in 1915.

== Career ==
Upon admission to the Virginia bar, Barksdale practiced law in Lynchburg, Virginia, from 1915 to 1916 before leaving to enter military service, for which he had trained at VMI.

=== Military service ===
During World War I, Barksdale served in the United States Army from 1916 to 1922, with the Virginia-based 116th Infantry Regiment of the 29th Infantry Division in Europe. Rising to the rank of captain, Barksdale received the Distinguished Service Cross, the Croix de Guerre, and the Chevalier Legion of Honor.

==== Distinguished Service Cross citation ====
"Alfred D. Barksdale, captain, 116th Infantry. For repeated acts of extraordinary heroism in action near Samogneux, France, October 8, 1918; near Molleville, France, October 12; and in the Bois de la Grand Montagne, France, October 15, 1918. Commanding a support company during the attack of October 8, Capt. Barksdale discovered that his battalion had advanced ahead of the unit on the right flank, and was suffering heavy losses from machine gun fire. Without orders he attacked and captured the guns, taking many prisoners. On October 12 he worked for over an hour, exposed to a terrific bombardment, binding the wounds of his men. On October 15 he advanced alone in a thick wood and, with the aid of his pistol, put out of action a destructive machine gun which was pouring such a deadly fire his men could not raise their heads."

==== University of Virginia presentation ====
At the centennial ceremonies for the University of Virginia, Captain Barksdale on behalf of the alumni presented the university with a plaque listing the names of 80 graduates killed in World War I.

=== Virginia state senator and judge ===
Barksdale returned to his private legal practice in Lynchburg from 1922 to 1938. Aligned with the Byrd Organization, and following his father's career path, he sat on the Democratic State Central Committee. Barksdale also won election to the Senate of Virginia, representing the 12th Virginia senatorial district (then Lynchburg and Campbell County and still a part-time position) from 1924 to 1928. His successor was Samuel Cook Goggin, the long-time clerk of the Bedford County court.

A decade later, during the Great Depression, the Virginia General Assembly elected Barksdale as Judge of the Virginia Circuit Court for the Sixth Judicial Circuit, and he served from 1938 to 1940.

=== Federal judicial service ===
Barksdale received a recess appointment from President Franklin D. Roosevelt on December 19, 1939, to a seat on the United States District Court for the Western District of Virginia vacated by Judge Armistead Mason Dobie. He was nominated to the same position by President Roosevelt on January 11, 1940. The United States Senate confirmed the appointment on February 1, 1940, and Barksdale received his commission on February 5, 1940. He assumed senior status on August 1, 1957. His service terminated on August 16, 1972, due to his death.

Assigned a school desegregation case involving Pulaski County, which had no high school for black students, but three secondary schools for white students, as well as manifestly unequal elementary schools, Barksdale insisted that no two schools are ever precisely equal, and that the arguments of Spottswood Robinson and Oliver Hill concerning desegregation would be the death knell for consolidated high schools (black students were bused up to sixty miles per day to attend a training academy in Christiansburg). The Fourth Circuit Court of Appeals soon reversed him in 1949, which stunned the Richmond News Leader, which printed an editorial by Douglas Southall Freeman acknowledging that 44 Virginia counties and cities had no accredited black high school.

== Personal life ==
Barksdale married Louisa Estill Winfree on December 15, 1934, and they had two daughters. His youngest daughter, Mary Owen Barksdale Garbee resides in Lynchburg, Va.

== Death and legacy ==
Barksdale died on August 16, 1972, in Lynchburg. His wartime papers from his World War I service are held by the VMI library, and those from his federal judicial service are held by the University of Virginia library. VMI established a scholarship in his name in 1974–1975.

== Sources ==
Legal offices
Preceded by Armistead Mason Dobie	Judge of the United States District Court for the Western District of Virginia; 1939–1957	Succeeded by Roby C. Thompson
