= List of elections in 1893 =

The following elections occurred in the year 1893.

- 1893 Honduran presidential election
- 1893 Liberian general election
- 1893 Newfoundland general election

== North America ==
=== Canada ===
- 1893 Edmonton municipal election
- 1893 Newfoundland general election
- 1893 Prince Edward Island general election

=== United States ===
- 1893 New York state election

==== United States Senate ====
- 1892 and 1893 United States Senate elections
- United States Senate election in California, 1893
- United States Senate election in Massachusetts, 1893
- United States Senate election in New York, 1893
- 1893 United States Senate election in Pennsylvania
- 1893 United States Senate election in Wisconsin

==== United States House of Representatives ====
- 1893 United States House of Representatives elections
- 1893 Massachusetts's 7th congressional district special election
- 1893 Michigan's 1st congressional district special election
- 1893 Ohio's 10th congressional district special election
- 1893 Pennsylvania's 2nd congressional district special election
- 1893 Pennsylvania's 8th congressional district special election
- 1893 Wisconsin's 4th congressional district special election

==== United States gubernatorial ====
- 1893 Iowa gubernatorial election
- 1893 Massachusetts gubernatorial election
- 1893 Ohio gubernatorial election
- 1893 Rhode Island gubernatorial election
- 1893 United States gubernatorial elections
- 1893 Virginia gubernatorial election

==== United States mayoral elections ====
- 1893 Boston mayoral election
- 1893 Chicago mayoral election
- 1893 Chicago mayoral special election

== Europe ==
- 1893 Bulgarian Constitutional Assembly election
- 1893 Bulgarian parliamentary election
- 1893 Faroese general election
- 1893 French legislative election
- 1893 German federal election
- 1893 Luxembourg general election
- March 1893 Serbian parliamentary election
- May 1893 Serbian parliamentary election
- 1893 Spanish general election
- 1893 Swedish general election
- 1893 Swiss federal election

== Oceania ==
=== Australia ===
- 1893 South Australian colonial election

=== New Zealand ===
- 1893 New Zealand general election
- 1893 City of Auckland by-election
- 1893 Inangahua by-election
- 1893 Thames by-election
- 1893 Wanganui by-election

== See also ==
- Category:1893 elections
