= 1893 United States gubernatorial elections =

- November 7, 1893; April 5, 1893 (RI)

5 governorships
	Majority party	Minority party
Party	Democratic	Republican
Seats before	27	14
Seats after	25	16
Seat change	▼2	▲2
Seats up	3	2
Seats won	1	4
	Third party
Party	Populist
Seats before	3
Seats after	3
Seat change	Steady
Seats up	0
Seats won	0
- Democratic gain Democratic hold Republican gain Republican hold

United States gubernatorial elections were held in 1893, in five states.

Virginia holds its gubernatorial elections in odd numbered years, every 4 years, following the United States presidential election year. Massachusetts and Rhode Island at this time held gubernatorial elections every year. They would abandon this practice in 1920 and 1912, respectively. Iowa and Ohio at this time held gubernatorial elections in every odd numbered year.

== Results ==
State	Incumbent	Party	Status	Opposing candidates
Iowa	Horace Boies	Democratic	Defeated, 42.00%	Frank D. Jackson (Republican) 49.74% J. M. Joseph (Populist) 5.77% Bennett Mitchell (Prohibition) 2.49%
Massachusetts	William E. Russell	Democratic	Retired, Republican victory	Frederic T. Greenhalge (Republican) 52.77% John E. Russell (Democratic) 42.99% Louis Albert Banks (Prohibition) 2.34% George H. Cary (Populist) 1.34% Patrick F. O'Neil (Socialist Labor) 0.56%
Ohio	William McKinley	Republican	Re-elected, 52.61%	Lawrence T. Neal (Democratic) 42.78% Gideon P. Macklin (Prohibition) 2.72% Edward J. Bracken (Populist) 1.89%
Rhode Island (held, 5 April 1893)	Daniel Russell Brown	Republican	No election, (Note: No candidate received a majority of the vote, and under the law the Legislature was required to elect the governor. However, the two houses refused to meet in Grand Committee and no choice was made. Governor Brown continued in office for the term.) 46.24%	David Sherman Baker Jr. (Democratic) 46.63% Henry B. Metcalf (Prohibition) 6.92% Scattering 0.22%
Virginia	Philip W. McKinney	Democratic	Term-limited, Democratic victory	Charles Triplett O'Ferrall (Democratic) 59.19% Edmund R. Cocke (Populist) 37.58% James R, Miller (Prohibition) 3.22% Scattering 0.01%

== Bibliography ==
- Glashan, Roy R. (1979). American Governors and Gubernatorial Elections, 1775-1978. Meckler Books. ISBN 0-930466-17-9.
- Gubernatorial Elections, 1787-1997. Washington, D.C.: Congressional Quarterly Inc. 1998. ISBN 1-56802-396-0.
- Dubin, Michael J. (2014). United States Gubernatorial Elections, 1861-1911: The Official Results by State and County. Jefferson, North Carolina: McFarland. ISBN 978-0-7864-4722-0.
- The World Almanac and Encyclopedia, 1894. New York, NY: The Press Publishing Co. 1894.
- The Tribune Almanac for 1894. New York, NY: The Tribune Association. 1894.
