= Judge Paul =

Judge Paul may refer to:

- Charles Ferguson Paul (1902–1965), judge of the United States District Court for the Northern District of West Virginia
- John Paul (judge) (1839–1901), judge of the United States District Court for the Western District of Virginia
- John Paul Jr. (judge) (1883–1964), judge of the United States District Court for the Western District of Virginia
- Maurice M. Paul (1932–2016), judge of the United States District Court for the Northern District of Florida
