= Senator Conrad (disambiguation) =

Kent Conrad (born 1948) was a U.S. Senator from North Dakota from 1987 to 2013. Senator Conrad may also refer to:

- Charles Magill Conrad (1804–1878), U.S. Senator from Louisiana from 1842 to 1843
- Danielle Conrad (born 1977), Nebraska State Senate
- George N. Conrad (1869–1937), Virginia State Senate
- Sally Conrad (born 1941), Vermont State Senate
- Silas A. Conrad (1840–1913), Ohio State Senate
- William N. Conrad (1889–1968), New York State Senate

== See also ==
- Conrad Burns (1935–2016), U.S. Senator from Montana from 1989 to 2007
