= 1897 Virginia gubernatorial election =

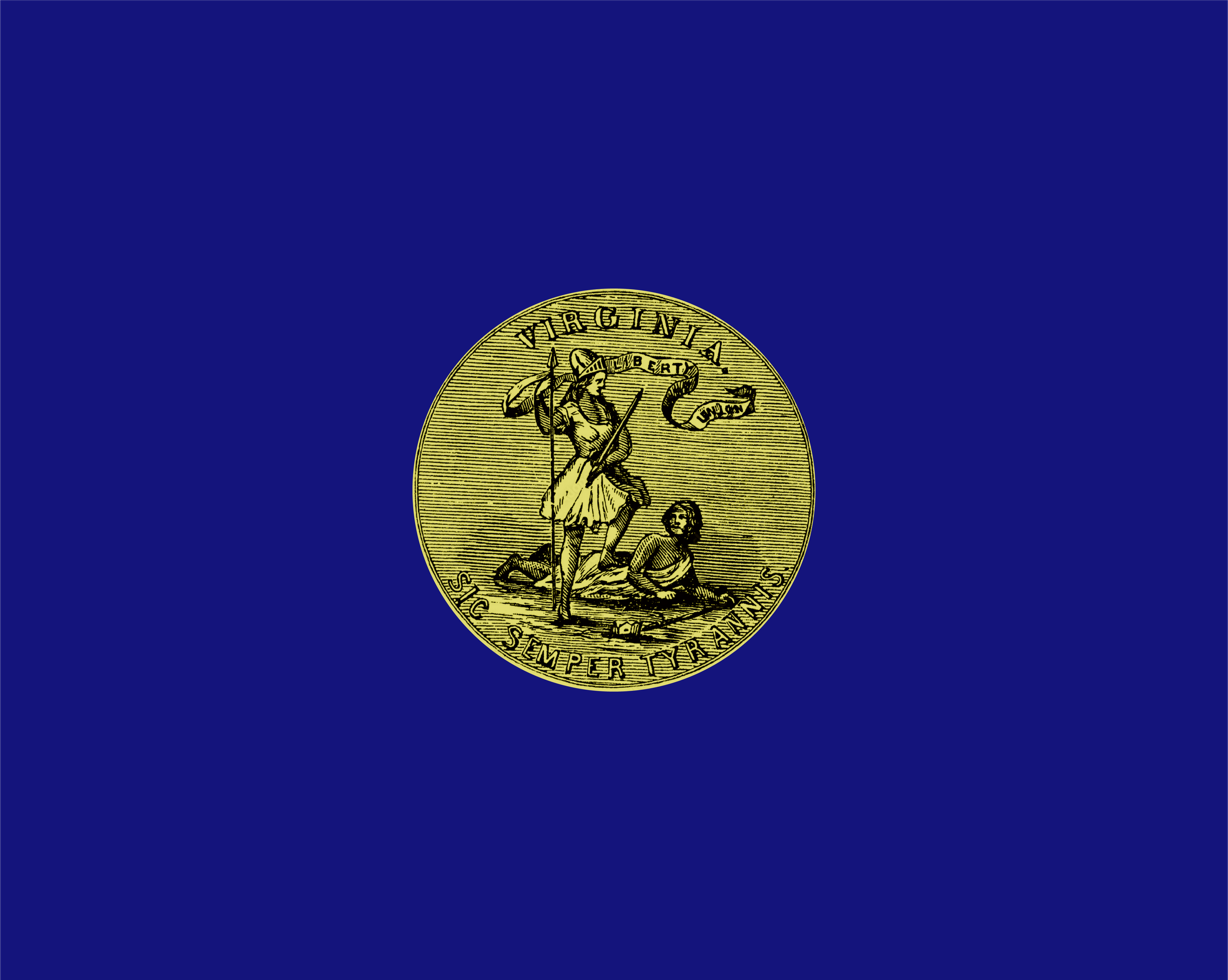
- November 2, 1897
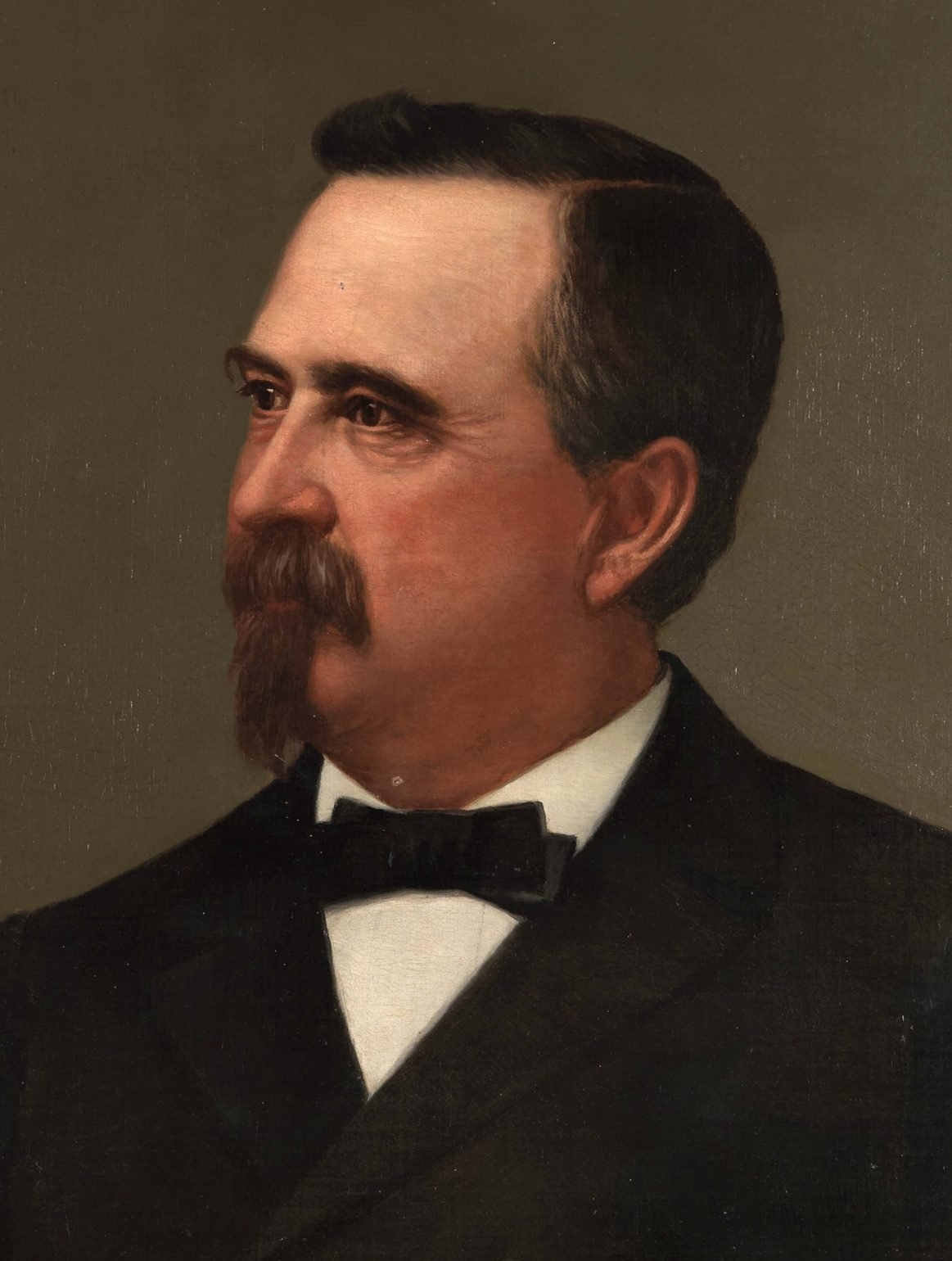

Nominee	James Hoge Tyler	Patrick H. McCaull
Party	Democratic	Republican
Popular vote	110,253	56,739
Percentage	64.59%	33.24%
- County results Tyler: 50–60% 60–70% 70–80% 80–90% >90% McCaull: 40–50% 50–60% 60–70%
Governor before election
Charles T. O'Ferrall
Democratic
Elected Governor
James Hoge Tyler
Democratic

The 1897 Virginia gubernatorial election was held on November 2, 1897, to elect the governor of Virginia.

== Results ==
Virginia gubernatorial election, 1897
Party	Candidate	Votes	%
Democratic	James Hoge Tyler	110,253	64.59%
Republican	Patrick H. McCaull	56,739	33.24%
Prohibition	L. A. Cutler	2,743	1.61%
Socialist Labor	J. J. Quantz	528	0.31%
Independent	James S. Cowden	414	0.24%
Write-ins		13	0.01%
Total votes		170,690	100.00%
Democratic hold			
