= Governor Tyler =

Governor Tyler may refer to:

- James Hoge Tyler (1846–1925), 43rd Governor of Virginia
- John Tyler Sr. (1747–1813), 15th Governor of Virginia
- John Tyler (1790–1862), 23rd Governor of Virginia before becoming the tenth president of the United States
