= John Paul (judge) =

American judge

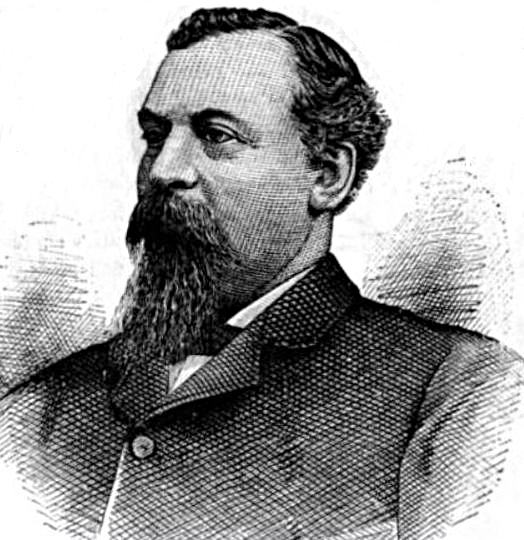

Judge of the United States District Court for the Western District of Virginia
- In office March 3, 1883 – November 1, 1901
- Appointed by: Chester A. Arthur
- Preceded by: Alexander Rives
- Succeeded by: Henry C. McDowell Jr.

Member of the U.S. House of Representatives from Virginia's 7th district
- In office March 4, 1881 – September 5, 1883
- Preceded by: John T. Harris
- Succeeded by: Charles Triplett O'Ferrall

Member of the Senate of Virginia from Rockingham County
- In office 1878–1881
- Preceded by: Samuel H. Moffett
- Succeeded by: Joseph B. Webb

Personal details
- Born: John Paul; June 30, 1839 Ottobine, Virginia, US
- Died: November 1, 1901 (aged 62) Harrisonburg, Virginia, US
- Resting place: Woodbine Cemetery, Harrisonburg, Virginia, US
- Party: Readjuster
- Children: John Paul Jr.
- Parents: Peter Paul (father); Maria Whitmer (mother)
- Education: University of Virginia School of Law (LL.B.)
- Occupation: farmer, lawyer, politician, judge

Military service
- Allegiance: Confederate States
- Branch/service: Confederate States Army
- Years of service: 1861–1865
- Rank: Colonel
- Battles/wars: American Civil War

John Paul (June 30, 1839 – November 1, 1901) was a United States representative from Virginia and a United States district judge of the United States District Court for the Western District of Virginia.

== Early life and education ==
Born on June 30, 1839, near Ottobine, Rockingham County, Virginia, to the former Maria Whitmer and her farmer husband, Peter Paul. His ancestors had fled religious persecution in France and traveled to Germany, and his grandfather Jacob Paul emigrated across the Atlantic Ocean in 1775, when he was just seventeen, then enlisted in the Revolutionary Army and served as a drummer boy at the Battle of Bunker Hill and later as a soldier with the rank of private. After the conflict, he emigrated to Rockingham County, where his wife gave birth to Peter Paul, this boy's father. His maternal ancestors, the Whitmers, were among the German emigrants who settled in the Shenandoah Valley in the late 18th century. Paul attended the common schools, then taught at a similar country school for a year in order to earn money for further education. In the fall of 1860, Paul traveled to the Valley's southern end and enrolled at Roanoke College in Salem. However, before the spring term finished, Virginia had seceded from the Union, and John Paul volunteered to fight for his native state, as described below. After surviving the conflict, the 26 year old Paul traveled to Charlottesville to study law under John B. Minor. He received a Bachelor of Laws in 1867 from the University of Virginia School of Law.

== American Civil War ==
During the Civil War, John Paul entered the Confederate States Army as a private in the Salem Artillery on May 1, 1861, along with his brother Paul (1846–1937). Although all agree he served until the final days of the war, accounts differ as to his term with the Salem Artillery and the subsequent cavalry unit. By one account, within a month, both brothers had transferred to the 1st Virginia Cavalry where their brother Peter Paul Jr. (1842–1906) had enlisted. Another account has him serving as lieutenant of Company I of the 5th Virginia Cavalry. Both accounts agree that during the Second Manassas Campaign, John Paul was severely wounded during a night charge at Catlett's Station on August 22, 1862. returned to action and was promoted to 3rd lieutenant, then was wounded again and captured during the Battle of Spotsylvania Courthouse on May 7, 1864, and imprisoned at Fort Delaware. He was released on June 16, 1865,

== Early career ==
Admitted to the bar, Paul began a private legal practice in Harrisonburg, the Rockingham County seat. In his second year, he successfully ran to become commonwealth's attorney (prosecutor), and won re-election until 1877, when Paul instead ran for legislative office. While the Commonwealth Attorney, Paul was allowed to have a civil practice, and he had a large and comparatively lucrative roster of bankruptcy cases. In 1877, voters from Rockingham and nearby counties elected Paul to the Senate of Virginia (a part-time position which allowed him to continue his legal practice) and re-elected him in 1879, at which time he aligned with the Readjuster Party. Paul also campaigned for the party's gubernatorial candidate, former CSA General Mahone, who did not win, but later became a U.S. Senator in part through Paul's advocacy in the state senate. Paul's father, Peter Paul, drowned in the Dry River on November 27, 1878, four days before the brother of his some-time rival, Sen. John F. Lewis, drowned in the South Shenandoah River. Col. (later Gov.) Charles T. O'Ferrall, who practiced law in Rockingham County before his political career, called Paul "one of the ablest prosecuting attorneys I have ever known".

== Congressional service ==
Between his Virginia senate victories, Paul ran for the U.S. House of Representatives in 1878, however, he failed to defeat unpopular incumbent congressman John T. Harris, who again served in the 46th United States Congress, in part because several other Readjusters also ran for the same seat. Although Paul outpolled fellow Readjusters Riddleberger, Henry C. Allen of Shenandoah County and Moffett months before the election, Rev. John E. Massey withdrew late in the campaign and Gen. John Echols of Staunton withdrew in the final days. However, this led to formal organization of the Readjuster party, and two years later Paul defeated Judge Henry C. Allen (who ran as a Democrat). He thus represented Virginia's 7th congressional district in the United States House of Representatives during the 47th United States Congress, serving from March 4, 1881, to March 3, 1883. However, both these campaigns were close and led to legal contests, which Paul won in 1881. He presented credentials as a member-elect to the 48th United States Congress and served from March 4, 1883, until September 5, 1883, despite another ongoing legal contest. Paul resigned after President Arthur appointed him as a federal judge as described below. Thus, Paul's opponent in that election, fellow CSA veteran Charles Triplett O'Ferrall received the seat.

== Federal judicial service ==
President Chester A. Arthur nominated Paul on February 27, 1883, to a seat on the United States District Court for the Western District of Virginia vacated by the late Judge Alexander Rives. The United States Senate on March 3, 1883, and received his commission the same day. He died in office on November 1, 1901, in Harrisonburg. He was interred in Woodbine Cemetery in Harrisonburg.

== Personal life ==
Paul married Kate Seymour Green of Warren County, who bore four sons and three daughters, of whom all but one son survived their father. His son John Paul Jr. became a Virginia state senator, United States representative, and a United States district judge of the United States District Court for the Western District of Virginia.

== Legacy ==
Paul dedicated a new courthouse in Harrisonburg in 1896, and delivered a carefully prepared historical address concerning the local bar. Paul donated part of the family's farm in Ottobine, Virginia to become the Paul State Forest.

== Electoral history ==
- 1880; Paul was elected to the U.S. House of Representatives with 49.3% of the vote, defeating Democrat Henry C. Allen (Virginia) and Republican William C. Moseley.
- 1882; Paul appeared re-elected with 50.2% of the vote, defeating Democrat Charles T. O'Ferrall (who was later declared the winner) and Republican James W. Cochran.

== Sources ==
- United States Congress. "John Paul (id: P000144)". Biographical Directory of the United States Congress.
- "Paul, John - Federal Judicial Center". www.fjc.gov.
- This article incorporates public domain material from Biographical Directory of the United States Congress. Federal government of the United States.

U.S. House of Representatives
Preceded by John T. Harris	Member of the U.S. House of Representatives from Virginia's 7th congressional district 1881–1883	Succeeded by Charles Triplett O'Ferrall
Legal offices
Preceded by Alexander Rives	Judge of the United States District Court for the Western District of Virginia; 1883–1901	Succeeded by Henry C. McDowell Jr.
