= John T. Harris =

American politician (1823–1899)

John Thomas Harris
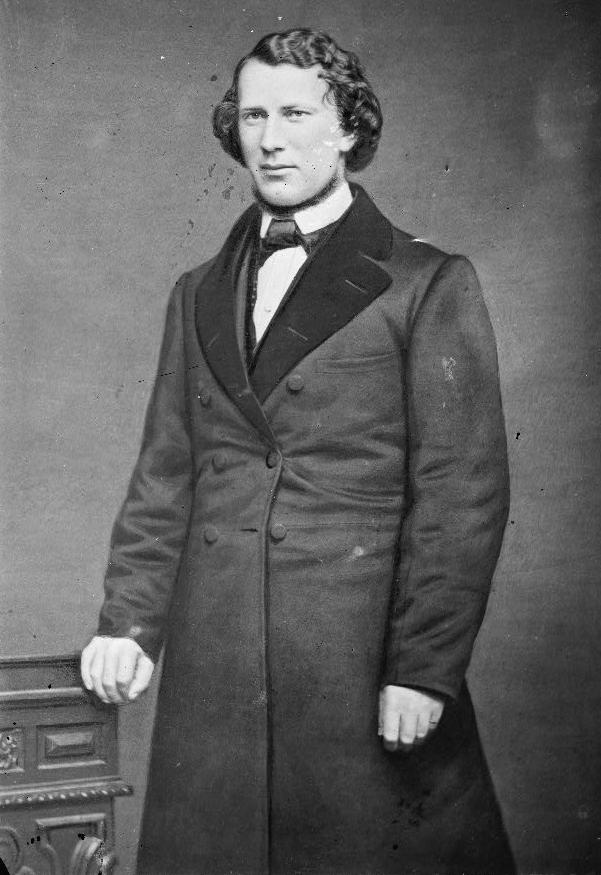

Member of the U.S. House of Representatives from Virginia
- In office March 4, 1859 – March 3, 1861
- Preceded by: John Letcher
- Succeeded by: Rees Bowen
- Constituency: 9th district
- In office March 4, 1871 – March 3, 1881
- Preceded by: William Milnes, Jr. (6th); Elliott M. Braxton (7th)
- Succeeded by: Thomas Whitehead (6th); John Paul (7th)
- Constituency: 6th district (1871-73); 7th district (1873-81)

Chairman of the Committee on Revision of Laws
- In office March 4, 1879 – March 3, 1881
- Preceded by: William Walsh
- Succeeded by: William C. Oates

Chairman of the Committee on Elections
- In office March 4, 1875 – March 3, 1879
- Preceded by: Horace B. Smith
- Succeeded by: William M. Springer

Member of the Virginia House of Delegates from Rockingham County
- In office 1863–1865; Alongside James Kenney

Personal details
- Born: May 8, 1823 Browns Gap, Albemarle County, Virginia, US
- Died: October 14, 1899 (aged 76) Harrisonburg, Virginia, US
- Party: Independent Democrat, Democrat
- Profession: Politician, Lawyer, Judge

John Thomas Harris (May 8, 1823 – October 14, 1899) was a nineteenth-century politician, lawyer and judge from Virginia. He was often referred to after the American Civil War as "Judge Harris", even after his election to Congress. He was the first cousin of John Hill.

== Early and family life ==
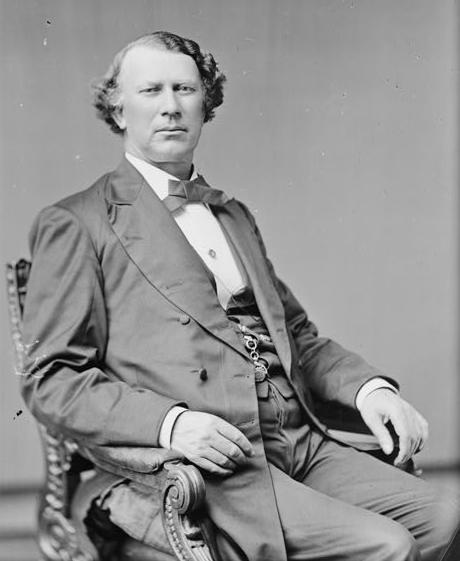
John T. Harris

Born in Browns Gap, Virginia, Harris completed academic studies and studied law.

== Career ==
Admitted to the Virginia bar in 1845, Harris began his legal practice in Harrisonburg, Virginia. He was elected the commonwealth attorney for Rockingham County, Virginia, and served from 1852 to 1859. The practice prospered so that he owned $9000 in real estate and lived with his wife and three young children lived with a 17 year old white woman and 23 year old Black man according to the 1860 census. By that time, he also owned $7000 in personal property, including three slaves (19, 13 and 5 year old Black girls).

Harris won election as an Independent Democrat to the United States House of Representatives in 1858, serving from 1859 to 1861. He ran for reelection, but the seat was terminated from Congress after Virginia's secession from the Union on April 17, 1861. Harris initially vehemently opposed secession, including in a large political rally in Rockbridge, but George Deneale took the opposite position, and Harris later lobbied voters to elect delegates who would allow a referendum on secession, which passed nearly unanimously in the county.

=== American Civil War ===
Rockbridge voters elected Harris to the Virginia House of Delegates, and served from 1863 to 1865.

=== Return to Congress ===
After the war's end, Harris became judge of the twelfth judicial circuit of Virginia from 1866 to 1869. He became known for his "frank and manly" acceptance of the war's results, including his charge to the grand jury on May 11, 1867, exhorting members to do their duty "without fear or favor."

Upon Virginia's adopting a new Constitution which forbad slavery and thus allowed its readmission to the Union in 1869, and restoration of civil rights to Confederate officials, Harris ran for the U.S. House of Representatives at a special election held in July 1869, but lost.

The following year, 1870, voters sent him back to the U.S. Congress as a Democrat, and he won re-election several times, serving from 1871 to 1881. However, the numbering of the district Harris represented changed from Virginia's 6th District to Virginia's 7th District in 1872 due to reapportionment after the 1870 census. A White supremacist he opposed Civil Rights for African Americans.

Harris chaired the Committee on Elections from 1875 to 1879 and chairman of the Committee on Revision of Laws from 1879 to 1881. Harris declined a unanimous renomination in 1880. After a contested election, his successor as Commonwealth Attorney (and former state Senator) John Paul succeeded him for one term, and was succeeded by the Charles Triplett O'Ferrall, whom Harris had defeated in 1872 and 1874.

Harris served as chairman of the Virginia Democratic Convention in 1884, and was a commissioner to the 1893 World's Columbian Exposition in Chicago, Illinois.

== Death and legacy ==
He died in Harrisonburg, Virginia, on October 14, 1899. His papers, including a diary, are held in the special collections division of the James Madison University library.

== Electoral history ==
- 1870; Harris was elected to the U.S. House of Representatives unopposed.
- 1872; Harris was re-elected with 61.79% of the vote, defeating Independent Charles T. O'Ferrall.
- 1874; Harris was re-elected with 73.6% of the vote, defeating Republican John F. Lewis and Independents John F. Early and O'Ferrall.
- 1876; Harris was re-elected with 73.28% of the vote, defeating Republican Everett W. Early.
- 1878; Harris was re-elected with 56.46% of the vote, defeating Conservative John Paul.

U.S. House of Representatives
Preceded by John Letcher	Member of the U.S. House of Representatives from Virginia's 9th congressional district 1859–1861	Succeeded by Rees Bowen^{(1)}
Preceded by William Milnes Jr.	Member of the U.S. House of Representatives from Virginia's 6th congressional district 1871–1873	Succeeded by Thomas Whitehead
Preceded by Elliott M. Braxton	Member of the U.S. House of Representatives from Virginia's 7th congressional district 1873–1881	Succeeded by John Paul
Notes and references
1. Because of Virginia's secession, the House seat was vacant for twelve years before Bowen succeeded Harris.
