= Paul State Forest =

State forest in Virginia, United States

- Location within Virginia
- Location: Rockingham County, Virginia
- Nearest city: Harrisonburg, VA
- Coordinates: 38°26′6.6″N 79°2′10″W
- Area: 173 acres (70 ha)
- Established: 1962
- Governing body: Virginia Department of Forestry
- Website: Paul State Forest

Paul State Forest is a Virginia state forest located in Rockingham County near the town of Ottobine. Its 173 acres (0.70 km^{2}) are used for a variety of purposes including research.

It had previously been part of the family farm of John Paul, Jr., a United States federal judge in Western Virginia, who donated it to the state in 1961.
