= John Paul Jr. (judge) =

American judge

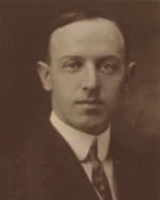

Senior Judge of the United States District Court for the Western District of Virginia
- In office August 1, 1958 – February 13, 1964

Chief Judge of the United States District Court for the Western District of Virginia
- In office 1948–1958
- Preceded by: Office established
- Succeeded by: Roby C. Thompson

Judge of the United States District Court for the Western District of Virginia
- In office January 14, 1932 – August 1, 1958
- Appointed by: Herbert Hoover
- Preceded by: Henry C. McDowell Jr.
- Succeeded by: Ted Dalton

United States Attorney for the Western District of Virginia
- In office 1929 – January 14, 1932
- Appointed by: Herbert Hoover
- Preceded by: Joseph C. Shaffer
- Succeeded by: Joseph C. Shaffer

Member of the U.S. House of Representatives from Virginia's 7th district
- In office December 15, 1922 – March 3, 1923
- Preceded by: Thomas W. Harrison
- Succeeded by: Thomas W. Harrison

Member of the Virginia Senate from the 8th district
- In office January 14, 1920 – December 15, 1922
- Preceded by: George N. Conrad
- Succeeded by: Ward Swank
- In office January 10, 1912 – January 12, 1916
- Preceded by: George B. Keezell
- Succeeded by: George N. Conrad

Personal details
- Born: December 9, 1883 Harrisonburg, Virginia, US
- Died: February 13, 1964 (aged 80) Ottobine, Virginia, US
- Party: Republican
- Parent: John Paul (father)
- Education: Virginia Military Institute (BA); University of Virginia School of Law (LLB)
- Occupation: Lawyer; farmer; politician; judge

John Paul Jr. (December 9, 1883 – February 13, 1964) was Virginia lawyer and farmer who served in the Virginia Senate and United States House of Representatives, before becoming a United States district judge of the United States District Court for the Western District of Virginia, and serving as Chief Judge during the Byrd Organization's Massive Resistance to the U.S. Supreme Court's decisions in Brown v. Board of Education.

== Early life and education ==
Born on December 9, 1883, in Harrisonburg, Rockingham County, Virginia, Paul attended both private and public schools. Although his father, John Paul, had been a twice wounded Confederate cavalry officer during the American Civil War, he had received a pardon, then won election to the Virginia senate as a Conservative and later Re-Adjuster. The elder John Paul then served in the U.S.Congress before becoming United States District Judge for the Western District of Virginia. Meanwhile, the younger John Paul received an education locally, then traveled to Lexington for further studies at the Virginia Military Institute and received a Bachelor of Arts degree in 1903 despite his father's death in 1901. Paul helped support his family by teaching at VMI in 1903 and 1904. Paul then traveled to Charlottesville for legal training, and earned a Bachelor of Laws degree in 1906 from University of Virginia School of Law.

== Early careers ==
Upon admission to the Virginia bar in 1906, Paul had a private practice in Harrisonburg from 1907 to 1917, and again from 1924 to 1929. Between those stints, Paul served as the city attorney for Harrisonburg, the Rockingham County seat which had become an independent city in its won right in 1916. Even during his judicial service described below, like his father before him, Paul operated his farm in Rockingham County.

=== Virginia state senator ===
Paul continued on his father's career path but affiliated with the Republican party. In 1911, voters from Rockingham County and surrounding areas elected Paul to the Senate of Virginia (a part time position). Instead of seeking re-election, he ran for the United States House of Representatives, but lost both in 1916 and 1918. In 1919 Paul again sought election to the Virginia senate, and won, then served until 1922.

=== World War I officer ===
The VMI graduate served in the United States Army during World War I, from May 1918 until May 1919. He rose to the rank of major in the American Expeditionary Forces, leading the Three Hundred and Thirteenth Field Artillery of the One Hundred and Fifty-fifth Field Artillery Brigade.

=== U.S. Congress ===
In 1922, Paul successfully contested the election of Thomas W. Harrison to the United States House of Representatives of the 67th United States Congress and served from December 15, 1922, to March 3, 1923. He was an unsuccessful candidate for reelection in 1922 to the 68th United States Congress. He was a delegate to the Republican National Conventions in 1912, 1916, 1920, and 1924.

=== Federal prosecutor ===
Paul was a special assistant to the Attorney General of the United States from 1923 to 1924. He was the United States Attorney for the Western District of Virginia from 1929 to 1932.

== Federal judicial service ==
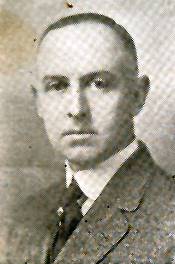
John Paul Jr.

President Herbert Hoover on December 15, 1931 nominated Paul to a seat on the United States District Court for the Western District of Virginia vacated by Judge Henry C. McDowell Jr. The United States Senate confirmed the appointment on January 11, 1932, and Judge Paul received his commission on January 14, 1932. He served as Chief Judge from 1948 to 1958. He assumed senior status on August 1, 1958, which permitted President Eisenhower to appoint (and the Senate to confirm) another judge to the seat, while Sr. Judge Paul continued with a reduced caseload. His successor, Ted Dalton, had been known as Virginia's "Mr. Republican" but in 1957 Virginia voters had overwhelmingly elected Democrat Lindsay Almond, whom the Byrd Organization supported, over Dalton. In 1960 Dalton became the Western District's Chief Judge when Roby C. Thompson, who had been nominated for another vacant seat in 1957, died in Abingdon.

Absalom Willis Robertson, despite his affiliation with the Byrd Organization, called Paul a dispenser of even handed justice.

=== Notable cases ===
In December 1934, Paul sat on a 3-judge panel with John J. Parker and William C. Coleman and wrote one of the two key legal decisions which permitted creation of Shenandoah National Park. Although plaintiff/appellant Robert H. Via (whose Huguenot ancestor had emigrated to Virginia in 1685) argued that Virginia could not use its eminent domain powers to condemn land to give to the United States to create the park, the U.S. Supreme Court upheld the decision in 'Via v. The State Commission on Conservation and Development of the State of Virginia'.

Paul also presided over the 50-day trial of the Franklin County moonshine conspiracy, said to be the longest trial in Virginia history to that time.

To Paul and his colleagues fell the task of implementing the Supreme Court's decision in Brown v. Board of Education in desegregation lawsuits in the Western District of Virginia. In August 1956, Paul issued a historic ruling ordering the desegregation of the Charlottesville public schools, and which soon set off Massive Resistance as by-now-United States Senator Harry Byrd vehemently disagreed with the United States Supreme Court ruling, and state officials obstructed its implementation. Paul also sat on the 3-judge panel that ordered the integration of the graduate schools of the University of Virginia in the Gregory Swanson case. He also ordered the desegregation of the schools in Warren County in 1958 and Grayson County in 1960.

== Death and legacy ==
In 1958, Chief Judge Paul took senior status (allowing President Eisenhower to fill his former seat), but continued to serve as a federal judge with a reduced workload until his death. In 1961, Paul donated part of his family's farm to become the Paul State Forest. On February 13, 1964, Judge Paul died at Ottobine, Rockingham County, Virginia. His alma mater, the University of Virginia Law School, received his papers and makes them available to researchers.

== Sources ==
- "John Paul Jr". Biographical Directory of the United States Congress.
- John Paul Jr. at The Virginia Elections and State Elected Officials Database Project, 1776-2007

U.S. House of Representatives
Preceded by Thomas W. Harrison	United States Representative from Virginia's 7th congressional district 1922–1923	Succeeded by Thomas W. Harrison
Legal offices
Preceded by Henry C. McDowell Jr.	Judge of the United States District Court for the Western District of Virginia; 1932–1958	Succeeded by Theodore Roosevelt Dalton
Preceded by Office established	Chief Judge of the United States District Court for the Western District of Virginia; 1948–1958	Succeeded by Roby C. Thompson
