= Henry C. McDowell Jr. =

American judge

Senior Judge of the United States District Court for the Western District of Virginia
- In office September 1, 1931 – October 8, 1933

Judge of the United States District Court for the Western District of Virginia
- In office November 12, 1901 – September 1, 1931
- Appointed by: Theodore Roosevelt
- Preceded by: John Paul
- Succeeded by: John Paul Jr.

Personal details
- Born: Henry Clay McDowell Jr. August 24, 1861 Louisville, Kentucky, US
- Died: October 8, 1933 (aged 72) Lexington, Kentucky, US
- Education: Yale University (B.A.); University of Virginia School of Law (LL.B.)

Henry Clay McDowell Jr. (August 24, 1861 – October 8, 1933) was a United States district judge of the United States District Court for the Western District of Virginia.

== Education and career ==
Born on August 24, 1861, in Louisville, Kentucky, McDowell received a Bachelor of Arts degree in 1881 from Yale University and a Bachelor of Laws in 1887 from the University of Virginia School of Law. He entered private practice in Lynchburg, Virginia from 1887 to 1901.

== Federal judicial service ==
On the recommendation of John Fox Jr. and Campbell Slemp, McDowell received a recess appointment from President Theodore Roosevelt on November 12, 1901, to a seat vacated by the death of Judge John Paul on the United States District Court for the Western District of Virginia. He was nominated to the same seat by President Roosevelt on December 5, 1901. His nomination was confirmed by the United States Senate on December 18, 1901, and he received his commission the same day. As Judge, McDowell lived in Lynchburg's prestigious Diamond Hill district.

In 1902, The New York Times reported that Judge McDowell had sentenced a labor organizer to jail for eight months for organizing activity aimed at the Virginia Iron Coal & Coke Company.

The late Judge H. Emory Widener Jr., in the foreword to the Washington & Lee Law Review's 1998 remembrance of Fourth Circuit judges, noted that Fox had helped convince Roosevelt to give the judgeship to McDowell, and went on to tell this story about a trial at the federal courthouse in Abingdon, Virginia:

Judge Henry Clay McDowell was presiding and, after a strenuous trial of several days, directed a verdict in favor of the defendant. The lawyer representing the plaintiff was Dan Trigg, a giant of the bar and the leading lawyer in Western Virginia. Judge McDowell bent over to tie his shoe, and the bench, at that time being elevated some two feet above the floor of the courtroom, screened him from the sight of everyone in the room. "Damn a federal judge anyhow," Mr. Trigg exclaimed, being audible to all. Judge McDowell, of course, heard the remark, but remained stooped over and left the courtroom by a door just behind the judge's chair so that no one knew he was in the room. He later summoned all the other lawyers in the courtroom to his chambers and said that he had heard Mr. Trigg's remark. He asked the lawyers if anyone in the room knew that he had heard it. When the lawyers advised him that no one had, he stated the rule that lawyers had a constitutional right to cuss the judge and, since Mr. Trigg didn't know he had been heard, he was not going to be fined.

Former Confederate John S. Mosby, who worked in the United States Department of Justice late in his career, supported McDowell for nomination to the Supreme Court, or at least to the Court of Appeals.

McDowell assumed senior status on September 1, 1931, and was succeeded by John Paul Jr., son of his predecessor.

== Death and legacy ==
Judge McDowell had a heart attack and died while visiting Lexington, Kentucky on October 8, 1933, at the age of 72. His former house in Lynchburg (1314 Clay Street) survives and is a contributing property to the Diamond Hill Historic District.

The New York Times reported in 1901 that the author John Fox Jr., also from Big Stone Gap, based a character in his book Blue-grass and Rhododendron: Outdoors in Old Kentucky on McDowell. The book was dedicated to McDowell, Bullitt, and Horace Ethelbert Cox, as "The First Three Captains of the Guard."

== Sources ==
- "McDowell, Henry Clay - Federal Judicial Center". www.fjc.gov.

Legal offices
| Preceded by John Paul | Judge of the United States District Court for the Western District of Virginia; 1901–1931 | Succeeded by John Paul Jr. |
