= Smith S. Turner =

American politician (1842–1898)

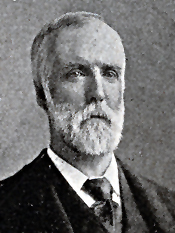

Member of the U.S. House of Representatives from Virginia's 7th district
- In office January 30, 1894 – March 3, 1897
- Preceded by: Charles T. O'Ferrall
- Succeeded by: James Hay

Member of the Virginia House of Delegates from Warren County
- In office 1869–1871
- Preceded by: District created
- Succeeded by: Samuel W. Thomas

Personal details
- Born: Smith Spangler Turner; November 21, 1842 Warren County, Virginia
- Died: April 8, 1898 (aged 55) Front Royal, Virginia
- Resting place: Prospect Hill Cemetery
- Party: Democratic
- Education: Virginia Military Institute
- Profession: Politician, lawyer

Military service
- Allegiance: Confederate States of America
- Branch/service: Confederate States Army
- Years of service: 1861–1865
- Unit: Army of Northern Virginia
- Battles/wars: American Civil War

Smith Spangler Turner (November 21, 1842 – April 8, 1898) was an American lawyer and Confederate veteran of the Civil War who served two terms as a U.S. representative from Virginia from 1894 to 1897.

== Biography ==
Turner was born in Warren County, Virginia.

=== Civil War ===
He was a cadet at the Virginia Military Institute, Lexington, Virginia, when the Civil War commenced, and was subsequently given an honorary diploma. He enlisted in the Confederate States Army in 1861. He served with General Stonewall Jackson as drill officer. He was an officer of George Pickett's division during the remainder of the war.

=== Early career ===
He taught mathematics in a female seminary in Winchester, Virginia from 1865 to 1867. He studied law. He was admitted to the bar in 1869 and commenced practice in Front Royal, Virginia. He served as member of the Virginia House of Delegates from 1869 to 1872. He served as prosecuting attorney for Warren County, Virginia from 1874 to 1879. He served as member of the State board of visitors of the Virginia Military Institute for eight years.

=== Congress ===
Turner was elected as a Democrat to the Fifty-third Congress to fill the vacancy caused by the resignation of Charles T. O'Ferrall. He was later re-elected in the general election with 52.12% of the vote, defeating Republican Robert J. Walker, Populist Jacob S. Hopkins, and Independent G.T. Barbee. He was subsequently reelected to the Fifty-fourth Congress and served from January 30, 1894, to March 3, 1897.

He was not a candidate for renomination in 1896.

== Death and burial ==
He died in Front Royal, Virginia, April 8, 1898. He was interred in Prospect Hill Cemetery.

== Sources ==
- United States Congress. "Smith S. Turner (id: T000427)". Biographical Directory of the United States Congress.

U.S. House of Representatives
Preceded by Charles Triplett O'Ferrall	Member of the U.S. House of Representatives from Virginia's 7th congressional district January 30, 1894 – March 3, 1897	Succeeded by James Hay
