= George B. Keezell =

American politician

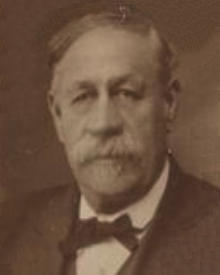
- Portrait of Keezell, 1922

Member of the Virginia House of Delegates for Rockingham and Harrisonburg
- In office January 11, 1922 – January 8, 1930 Serving with W.C. Hoover, Ralph H. Bader, Jacob R. Breneman
- Preceded by: William H. Ruebush
- Succeeded by: Jacob R. Breneman

Member of the Virginia Senate from the 8th district
- In office December 4, 1895 – January 10, 1912
- Preceded by: Thomas K. Harnsberger
- Succeeded by: John Paul Jr.
- In office January 4, 1884 – December 8, 1887
- Preceded by: Joseph B. Webb
- Succeeded by: John Acker

Personal details
- Born: George Bernard Keezell; July 20, 1854 Rockingham, Virginia, U.S.
- Died: June 22, 1931 (aged 76) Rockingham, Virginia, U.S.
- Party: Democratic
- Spouses: Mary Kate Hannah (m. 1886; died 1902); Belle Catherine Hannah (m. 1903; died 1924)
- Children: 7
- Occupation: Farmer; newspaper publisher; politician

George Bernard Keezell (July 20, 1854 – June 22, 1931) was a Virginia farmer, newspaperman and Democratic politician who served as a member of the Virginia Senate and later in the Virginia House of Delegates, in both representing his native Rockingham County.

== Early life and education ==
Born in Keezeltown in Rockingham County, at a home his grandfather (of the same name) had built in 1794, to the former Amanda Fitzallen Peale and her husband George Keezell (who had served in the War of 1812 and married late in life). George was an only child, the third generation to hold that family name. His father died when he was eight years old. Young George was educated in private schools locally, then for two years at Stuart Hall, a college in Baltimore.

== Career ==
Keezell began farming when he was 16, to support his mother. From 1912 until 1923 (during his part-time legislative service discussed below), Keezell engaged in newspaper work.

At age 21 he was selected as one of the local justices of the peace. In 1883 Keezell ran for state senate, and seemed to have lost to Republican Joseph B. Webb. However Keezell successfully challenged the results, and was seated in January 1884. Although he would be elected four times, so that his senatorial service was the longest of any man in his generation, for the second session of his first term, his senatorial district only included Rockingham County, and John Acker succeeded to that seat in 1887. Rockingham County voters again elected Keezell to represent them in the state senate nearly a decade later, in 1895 when he succeeded T.K. Harnsberger, and he was re-elected twice. Keezell resigned from the senate in 1910 to become Rockingham County's treasurer, whereupon Rockingham County voters selected county attorney (and Republican) John Paul to succeed him. More than a decade later, in 1921, Keezell won election as one of the two men representing Harrisonburg and Rockingham County in the Virginia House of Delegates, and was re-elected (with various men as co-delegates in the district) until 1929. Keezell served as chairman of the Rockingham County Democratic party for 25 years. He and George N. Earman also represented Rockingham County at the Virginia Constitutional Convention of 1902. Keezell also served as a presidential elector in 1904. Four successive governors also appointed him a member of the State Board of Fisheries. Keezell also took an active interest in education. He served on the senate committee for Public Institutions and Education, and was patron of the bill establishing the State Normal and Industrial School (now James Madison University) in Harrisonburg. He also served as chairman of its board of trustees.

== Personal life ==
In 1886 Keezell married M. Kate Hannah (1858-1902) of what had become Upshur County, West Virginia, and whose father had died fighting for the Union in Tennessee in 1863. Although their first child, George IV (b.1887) never survived infancy, three of their sons and two daughters survived both parents. In 1903, about a year after his first wife's death in 1902, Keezell married her elder sister, Belle C. Hannah (1850-1924).

== Death and legacy ==
Keezell surived both wives and died on June 21, 1931, and was buried, like his father and grandfather, his wives and some of his children, at the Keezletown cemetery.

Senate of Virginia
Preceded by Joseph B. Webb	Member of the Virginia Senate from the 8th district 1884–1887; 1895–1912	Succeeded by John Acker
Preceded by Thomas K. Harnsberger	Member of the Virginia Senate from the 8th district 1884–1887; 1895–1912	Succeeded by John Paul Jr.
Virginia House of Delegates
Preceded by William H. Ruebush	Member of the Virginia House of Delegates for Rockingham and Harrisonburg; 1922–1930	Succeeded by Jacob R. Breneman
Academic offices
Preceded by None	President of the Board of Trustees of the State Normal and Industrial School at Harrisonburg; 1908–1914	Succeeded by Richard B. Davis (as President of the Virginia Normal School Board)
