= 1889 Virginia gubernatorial election =

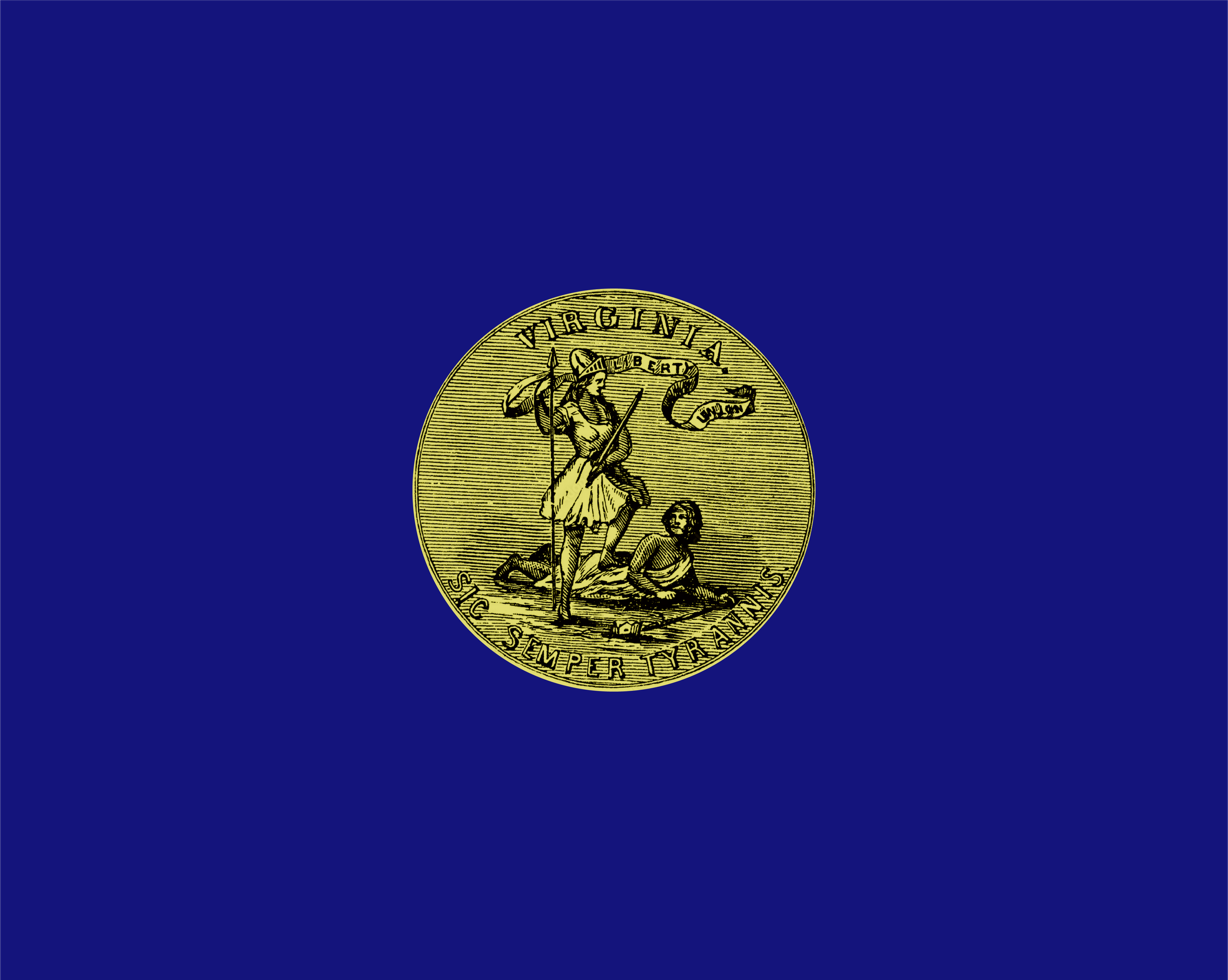
- November 5, 1889
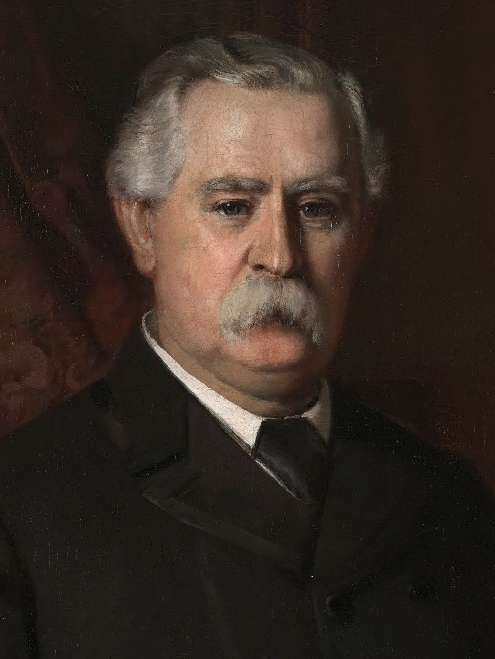

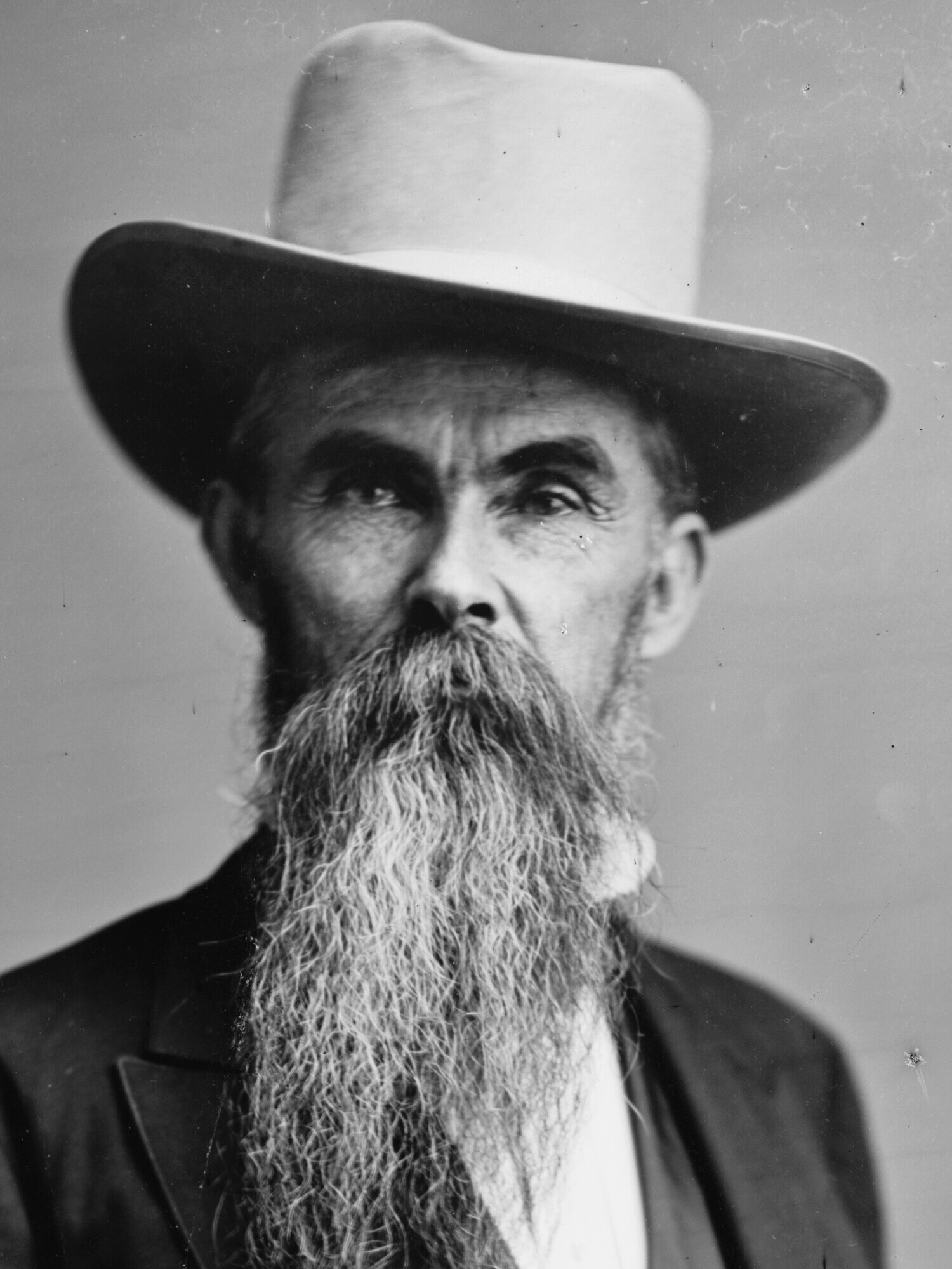
Nominee	Philip W. McKinney	William Mahone
Party	Democratic	Republican
Popular vote	163,180	121,240
Percentage	57.19%	42.49%
- County results McKinney: 50–60% 60–70% 70–80% 80–90% Mahone: 50–60% 60–70% No Data/Vote
Governor before election
Fitzhugh Lee
Democratic
Elected Governor
Philip W. McKinney
Democratic

The 1889 Virginia gubernatorial election was held on November 5, 1889, to elect the governor of Virginia.

== General election ==
=== Candidates ===
- William Mahone, former U.S. Senator (Republican)
- Philip W. McKinney, Commonwealth Attorney for Prince Edward County (Democratic)
- Thomas E. Taylor (Prohibition)

=== Results ===
Virginia gubernatorial election, 1889
Party	Candidate	Votes	%
Democratic	Philip W. McKinney	163,180	57.19%
Republican	William Mahone	121,240	42.49%
Prohibition	Thomas E. Taylor	897	0.31%
Total votes		285,317	100.00%
Democratic hold			
