= Thomas Whitehead (politician) =

American politician (1825–1901)

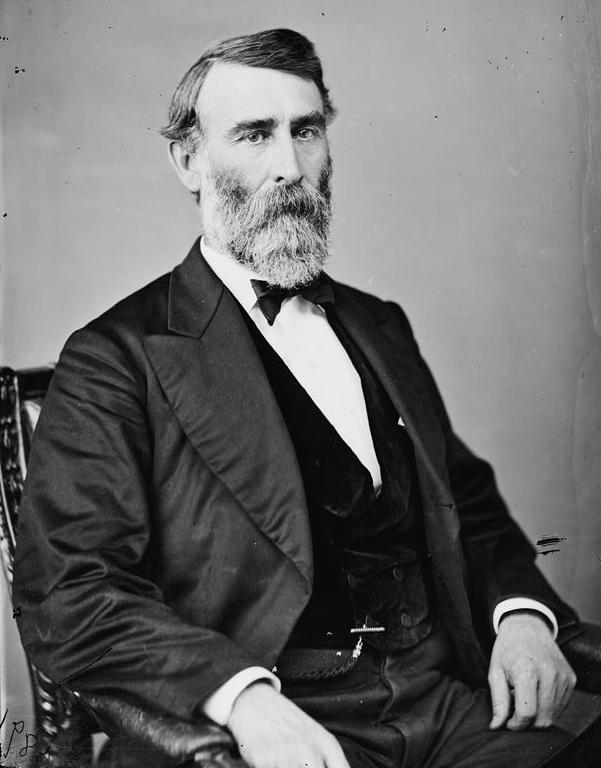

Member of the U.S. House of Representatives from Virginia's 6th district
- In office March 4, 1873 – March 3, 1875
- Preceded by: John T. Harris
- Succeeded by: John R. Tucker

Personal details
- Born: December 27, 1825 Lovingston, Virginia
- Died: July 1, 1901 (aged 75) Lynchburg, Virginia
- Party: Democratic
- Spouse: Martha Henry Garland
- Profession: Politician, Lawyer, Merchant, Editor

Military service
- Allegiance: Confederate States
- Branch/service: Confederate States Army
- Years of service: 1861–1865
- Rank: Captain
- Unit: 2nd Virginia Cavalry
- Battles/wars: American Civil War

Thomas Whitehead (December 27, 1825 – July 1, 1901) was a nineteenth-century politician, lawyer, editor and merchant from Virginia.

== Early life and education ==
Born in Lovingston, Virginia, Whitehead received a limited education as a child, later engaged in mercantile pursuits, studied law and was admitted to the bar in 1849, commencing practice in Amherst, Virginia.

== Career ==
=== American Civil War ===
During the American Civil War, he served in the Confederate Army as captain of Company E, 2nd Virginia Cavalry from 1862 to 1865, was twice wounded and was promoted to Major on April 15, 1865. Afterwards, he was elected to the Virginia Senate, but Reconstruction prevented him from taking seat. Whitehead was elected prosecuting attorney for Amherst County, Virginia in 1866 and again in 1869, resigning in 1873.

=== Post-war ===
He was elected as a Democrat to the United States House of Representatives in 1872, serving from 1873 to 1875 and afterwards was editor of the Lynchburg News in 1876 and of the Lynchburg Advance in 1880.

== Later life and death ==
Whitehead resumed practicing law and was elected commissioner of agriculture for Virginia in 1888, serving until his death on July 1, 1901, near Lynchburg, Virginia. He was interred in Spring Hill Cemetery in Lynchburg.

== Electoral history ==
1872; Whitehead was elected to the U.S. House of Representatives with 51.40% of the vote, defeating Independent J. Foote Johnson.

U.S. House of Representatives
Preceded by John T. Harris	Member of the U.S. House of Representatives from Virginia's 6th congressional district March 4, 1873 – March 3, 1875	Succeeded by John R. Tucker
