= Halwyck =

Historic house in Virginia, United States

- U.S. National Register of Historic Places
- Virginia Landmarks Register
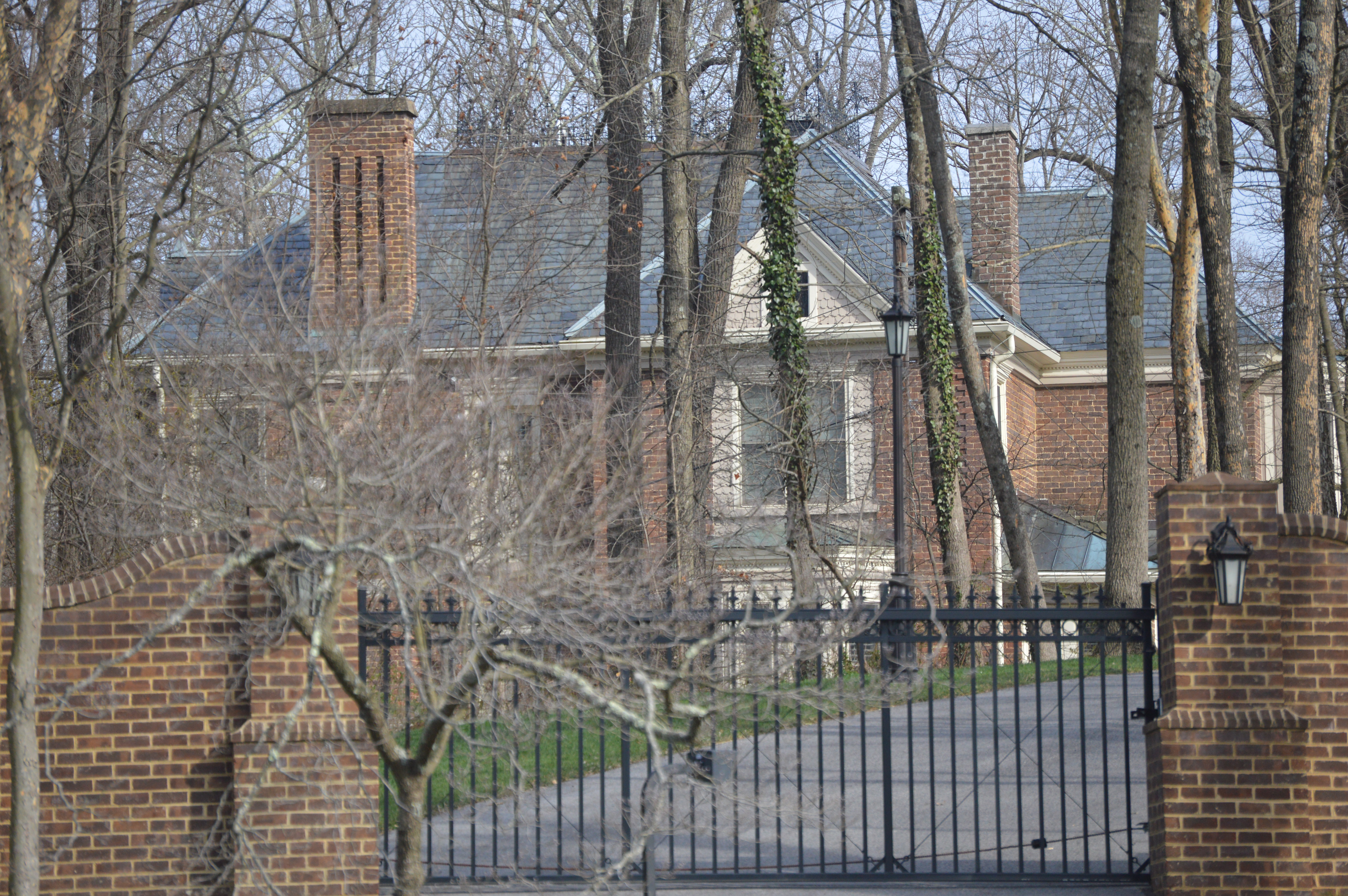
- Driveway view of the house

- Location within Virginia Location within the United States
- Location: 915 Tyler Avenue, Radford, Virginia
- Coordinates: 37°7′55″N 80°32′56″W
- Area: 1 acre (0.40 ha)
- Built: 1892
- Architectural style: Queen Anne
- NRHP reference No.: 97001074
- VLR No.: 126-0079

Significant dates
- Added to NRHP: August 29, 1997
- Designated VLR: July 2, 1997

Halwyck, also known as the James Hoge Tyler House, is a historic home located in Radford, Virginia. It was built in 1892, and is a large two-story, three-bay, Queen Anne brick dwelling on a wooded bluff-top lot overlooking bottomland along the New River. It has a central-passage, T-plan dwelling and a hipped roof. The house was the principal residence of Governor James Hoge Tyler and his wife, Susan Hammet Tyler, from the time it was built until their deaths in the 1920s.

It was listed on the National Register of Historic Places in 1997. Governor Tyler spelled the name of his home “Halwick,” and it carried this spelling while owned by him and his descendants, as documented by family photographs and numerous sources within the writings of Governor Tyler. When the home was added to the National Register of Historic Places the name of the home was changed to "Halwyck." One of the many sources that document the spelling of the home while owned by Governor Tyler is the book "The Family of Hoge: A Genealogy Compiled by James Hoge Tyler" (see page 66). Visit the website http://ead.lib.virginia.edu/vivaxtf/view?docId=vt/viblbv00220.xml for other references to "Halwick."
