= 1893 Luxembourg general election =

Partial general elections were held in Luxembourg on 13 and 20 June 1893, electing 20 members of the Chamber of Deputies. The elections took place in Capellen, Clervaux, Diekirch, Grevenmacher, Luxembourg-Ville, Redange and Vianden.

== Results ==
Canton	Seats	Candidate	First round	Second round
Canton	Seats	Candidate	Votes	Votes
Capellen	3	Edouard Hemmer	779	
Capellen	3	Théodore Risch	531	
Capellen	3	Émile Metz	513	
Capellen	3	Lux	423	
Capellen	3	Marx	257	
Capellen	3	Turnout	957	
Clervaux	3	Prüm	563	
Clervaux	3	Thinnes	507	
Clervaux	3	Carriers	505	
Clervaux	3	Liger	235	
Clervaux	3	Bouvier	196	
Clervaux	3	Turnout	728	
Diekirch	4	Félix de Blochausen	656	
Diekirch	4	Salentiny	582	
Diekirch	4	Jean-Pierre Scholtes	534	
Diekirch	4	Pierre Toussaint	465	450
Diekirch	4	Pemmers	460	510
Diekirch	4	François	421	
Diekirch	4	Schaack	298	
Diekirch	4	Turnout	1,036	968
Grevenmacher	3	Philippe Bech	705	
Grevenmacher	3	Felix Pütz	610	
Grevenmacher	3	Mathias Mehlen	564	
Grevenmacher	3	Michel Fohl	219	
Grevenmacher	3	Schoué	162	
Grevenmacher	3	Turnout	846	
Luxembourg-Ville	3	Émile Servais	591	
Luxembourg-Ville	3	Al. Brasseur	579	
Luxembourg-Ville	3	Charles Simons	526	602
Luxembourg-Ville	3	H. Herriges	512	496
Luxembourg-Ville	3	Eduard Simonis	426	
Luxembourg-Ville	3	Alph. München	350	
Luxembourg-Ville	3	Leon Rischard	180	
Luxembourg-Ville	3	Turnout	1,127	1,092
Redange	3	Bernard Krier	495	
Redange	3	Leopold Bian	455	560
Redange	3	Jean Orianne	448	444
Redange	3	Pierre Hemes	429	392
Redange	3	Em. Lenger	355	44
Redange	3	Turnout	971	957
Vianden	1	Hess	92	
Vianden	1	Salner	24	
Vianden	1	Berrens	19	
Vianden	1	Turnout	141	
