= 1893 United States House of Representatives elections =

- April 25, 1893 – December 19, 1893

6 of the 356 seats in the United States House of Representatives 179 seats needed for a majority
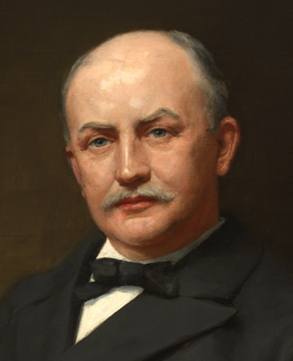

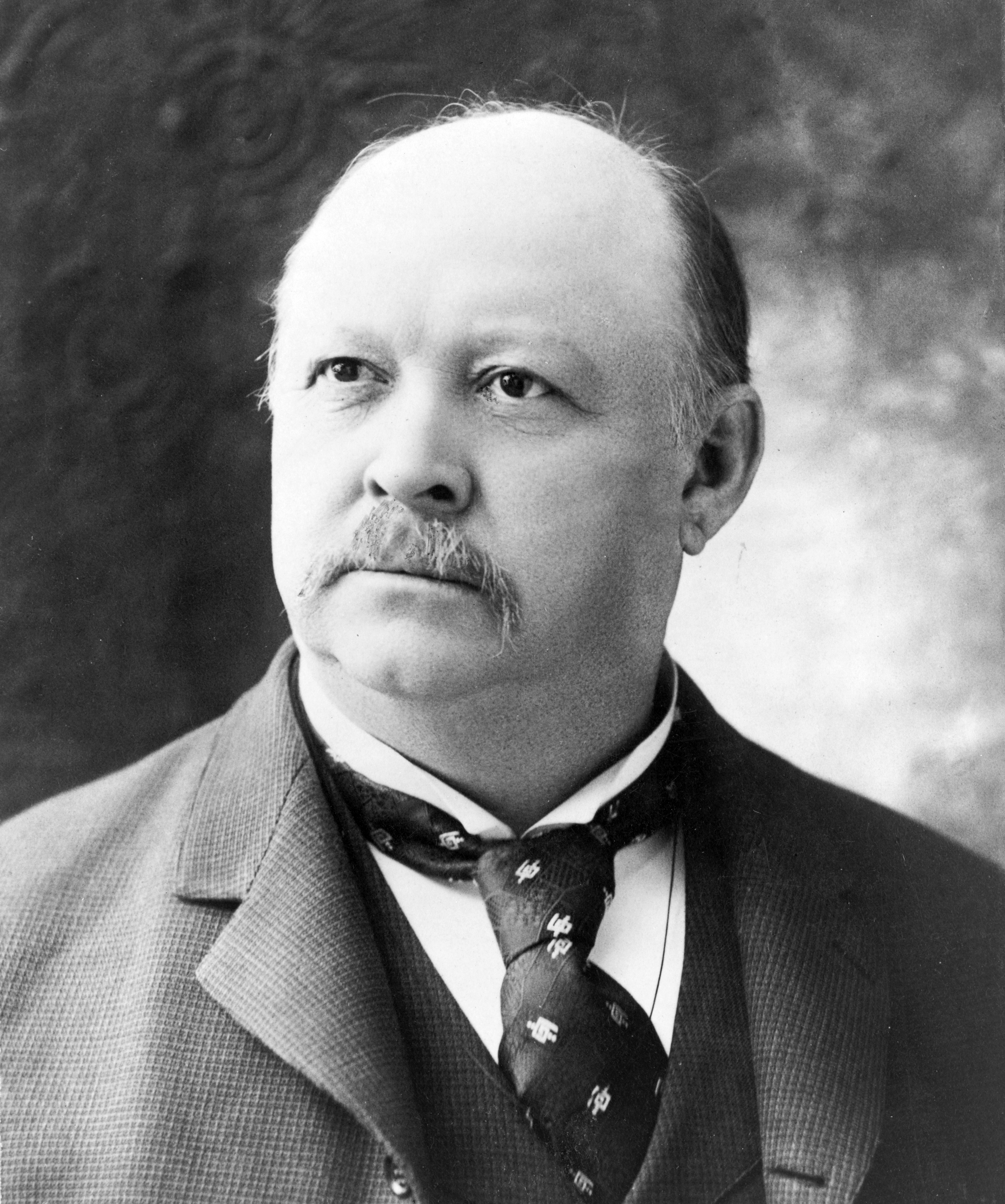

	Majority party	Minority party	Third party
Leader	Charles F. Crisp	Thomas Brackett Reed
Party	Democratic	Republican	Populist
Leader's seat	Georgia's 3rd	Maine's 1st
Last election	218 seats	124 seats	11 seats
Seats won	4	2	0
Seat change	▲1	▼1	Steady
	Fourth party	Fifth party
Party	Silver	Independent
Last election	1 seat	2 seats
Seats won	0	0
Seat change	Steady	Steady

There were six elections to the United States House of Representatives in 1893 in the 53rd United States Congress. There were no special elections that year for the 52nd United States Congress, which ended March 3, 1893.

== List of elections ==
Elections are listed by date and district.

District	Incumbent			This race	
District	Member	Party	First elected	Results	Candidates
Massachusetts 7	Henry Cabot Lodge	Republican	1886	Incumbent member-elect resigned during previous congress to become U.S. senator. New member elected April 25, 1893. Democratic gain.	▌ ✓ William Everett (Democratic) 46.27%; ▌William Emerson Barrett (Republican) 46.11%; ▌George H. Cary (People's) 4.76%; ▌Louis Albert Banks (Prohibition) 2.86%
Pennsylvania 8	William Mutchler	Democratic	1874; 1876 (retired); 1880; 1884 (retired); 1888	Incumbent died June 23, 1893. New member elected August 7, 1893. Democratic hold.	▌ ✓ Howard Mutchler (Democratic); [data missing]
Wisconsin 4	John L. Mitchell	Democratic	1890	Incumbent member-elect resigned during previous congress to become U.S. senator. New member elected April 4, 1893. Democratic hold.	▌ ✓ Peter J. Somers (Democratic) 51.3%; ▌Theobald Otjen (Republican) 45.8%; ▌Hiram F. Hixon (Prohibition) 2.9%
Michigan 1	J. Logan Chipman	Democratic	1886	Incumbent died August 17, 1893. New member elected December 4, 1893. Democratic hold.	▌ ✓ Levi T. Griffin (Democratic); [data missing]
Ohio 10	William H. Enochs	Republican	1890	Incumbent died July 13, 1893. New member elected December 4, 1893. Republican hold.	▌ ✓ Hezekiah S. Bundy (Republican); [data missing]
Pennsylvania 2	Charles O'Neill	Republican	1862; 1870 (lost); 1872	Incumbent died November 25, 1893. New member elected December 19, 1893. Republican hold.	▌ ✓ Robert Adams Jr. (Republican); [data missing]

== See also ==
- 52nd United States Congress
- 53rd United States Congress
