= George N. Conrad =

American politician

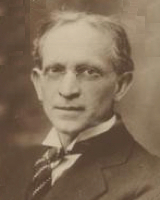

Member of the Virginia Senate from the 8th district
- In office January 12, 1916 – January 14, 1920
- Preceded by: John Paul Jr.
- Succeeded by: John Paul Jr.

Personal details
- Born: George Newton Conrad; August 24, 1869 Harrisonburg, Virginia, U.S.
- Died: January 21, 1937 (aged 67) Harrisonburg, Virginia, U.S.
- Party: Democratic
- Spouse: Emily Pasco
- Education: University of Virginia

George Newton Conrad (August 24, 1869 – January 21, 1937) was an American Democratic politician who served as a member of the Virginia Senate, representing the state's 8th district.

Senate of Virginia
Preceded by John Paul, Jr.	Virginia Senator for the 8th District; 1916–1920	Succeeded by John Paul, Jr.
