= Lawrence T. Neal =

American politician

Lawrence Talbot Neal
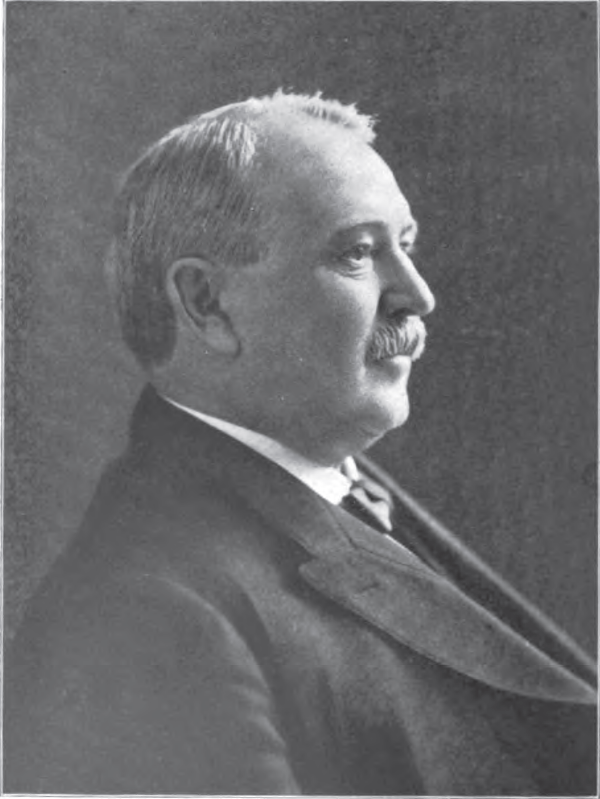

Member of the U.S. House of Representatives from Ohio's 7th district
- In office March 4, 1873 – March 3, 1877
- Preceded by: Samuel Shellabarger
- Succeeded by: Henry L. Dickey

Member of the Ohio House of Representatives from the Ross County district
- In office January 6, 1868 – January 2, 1870 Serving with Isaac J. Finley
- Preceded by: Jacob Sarber; Samuel B. Erskine
- Succeeded by: Lewis W. Sifford

Personal details
- Born: September 22, 1844 Parkersburg, Virginia, US
- Died: November 2, 1905 (aged 61) Chillicothe, Ohio, US
- Resting place: Grandview Cemetery, Chillicothe
- Party: Democratic

Lawrence Talbot Neal (September 22, 1844 – November 2, 1905) was an American lawyer and politician who served two terms as a U.S. representative from Ohio from 1873 to 1877.

== Early career ==
Born in Parkersburg, Virginia (now West Virginia), Neal pursued classical studies. He moved to Chillicothe, Ohio, in 1864. He studied law. He was admitted to the bar in 1866 and commenced practice in Chillicothe, Ohio, in 1867. City solicitor in 1867 and 1868. He declined to be a candidate for reelection.

Neal was elected prosecuting attorney of Ross County, Ohio, in 1870 and resigned in October 1872 to become a candidate for Congress.

== Congress ==
Neal was elected as a Democrat to the Forty-third and Forty-fourth Congresses (March 4, 1873 – March 3, 1877). He was an unsuccessful candidate for reelection in 1876 to the Forty-fifth Congress and for election in 1878 to the Forty-sixth Congress. He was an unsuccessful candidate for election to the State senate in 1887.

== Later career and death ==
He resumed the practice of law. He served as delegate to the Democratic National Conventions in 1888 and 1892. He was defeated by William McKinley for Governor of Ohio in 1893. He died in Chillicothe, Ohio, November 2, 1905. He was interred in Grandview Cemetery, Chillicothe, Ohio, US.

== Sources ==
- United States Congress. "Lawrence T. Neal (id: N000014)". Biographical Directory of the United States Congress.

U.S. House of Representatives
| Preceded by Samuel Shellabarger | Member of the U.S. House of Representatives from Ohio's 7th congressional district 1873-1877 | Succeeded by Henry L. Dickey |
Party political offices
| Preceded by James E. Campbell | Democratic Party nominee for Governor of Ohio; 1893 | Succeeded by James E. Campbell |
