= James Hoge Tyler =

American politician (1846–1925)

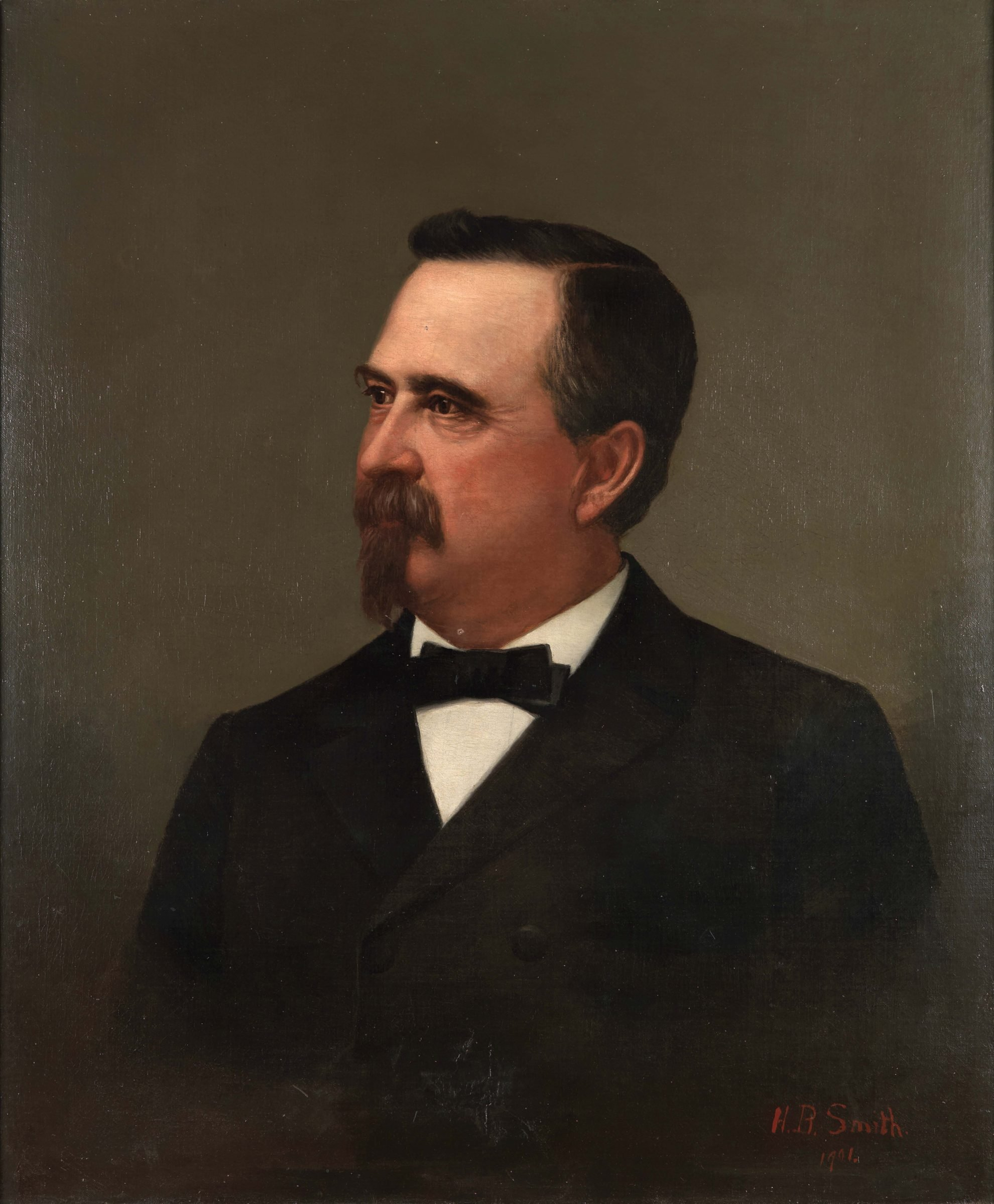

43rd Governor of Virginia
- In office January 1, 1898 – January 1, 1902
- Lieutenant: Edward Echols
- Preceded by: Charles T. O'Ferrall
- Succeeded by: Andrew Jackson Montague

16th Lieutenant Governor of Virginia
- In office January 1, 1890 – January 1, 1894
- Governor: Philip W. McKinney
- Preceded by: John E. Massey
- Succeeded by: Robert Craig Kent

Member of the Virginia Senate for Giles, Pulaski, Bland, and Tazewell
- In office December 5, 1877 – December 3, 1879
- Preceded by: Samuel H. Newberry
- Succeeded by: William A. French (as Sen. for Giles, Pulaski, & Bland); Samuel Leece (as Senator for Tazewell)

Personal details
- Born: James Hoge Tyler; August 11, 1846 Caroline County, Virginia, U.S.
- Died: January 3, 1925 (aged 78) Radford, Virginia, U.S.
- Party: Democratic
- Spouse: Sue Hammet (m.1868)
- Children: 8
- Occupation: Farmer

Military service
- Allegiance: Confederate States
- Branch/service: Confederate States Army
- Years of service: 1862–1865
- Rank: Private
- Unit: Signal Corps
- Battles/wars: American Civil War

James Hoge Tyler (August 11, 1846 – January 3, 1925) was a Confederate soldier, writer and political figure. He served in the Virginia Senate and became the 16th Lieutenant Governor of Virginia (1890 to 1894) and the 43rd Governor of Virginia (1898 to 1902). He compiled The Family of Hoge, published posthumously in 1927.

== Early and family life ==
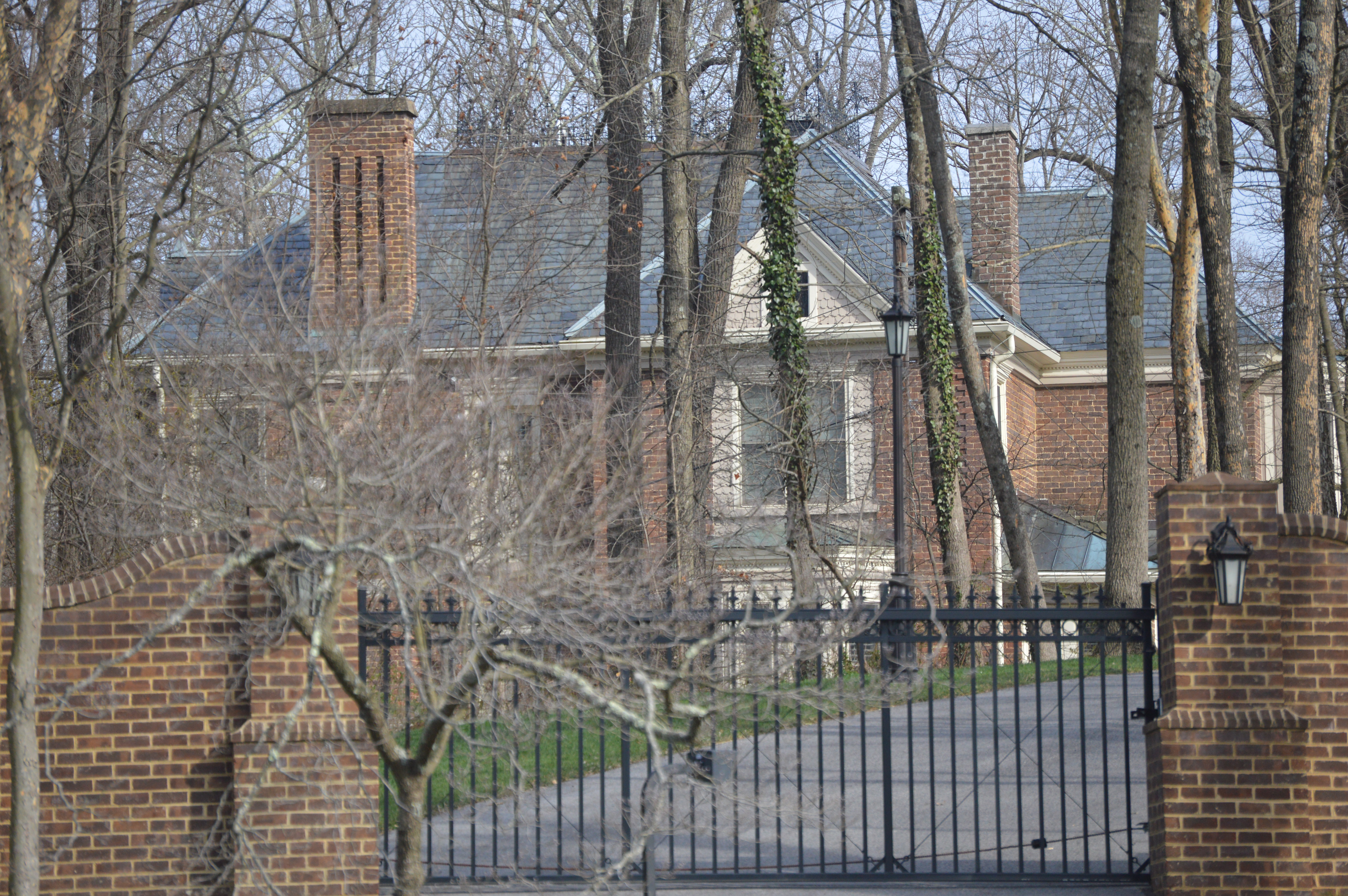
Halwyck, originally "Halwick", Tyler's Radford home

James Tyler was born at Blenheim plantation in Caroline County, Virginia, on August 11, 1846, to George Tyler (1817–1889) and his second wife Eliza Hoge (1815–1846). His parents were both descended from the First Families of Virginia. His great-grandfather, also George Tyler (1755–1833), served as a lieutenant in the Caroline County militia during the American Revolutionary War and descended from Richard Tyler who settled in Essex County in the 17th century. His father George Tyler was the eldest son of Henry Tyler (1791–1861) and his wife Lucy Coleman, All of his ancestors came to America from England and all arrived in the Colony of Virginia in the 1600s.

Two hours after James was born, his mother died of complications from the birth. His maternal grandparents took the boy 300 miles by carriage to their home, Hayfield, subsequently known as Belle Hampton, in Pulaski County, Virginia. There he was raised by his maternal grandparents, General James F. Hoge (1783–1861) and Eleanor Haven Howe, as well as his uncle William E. Hoge and his wife Jane with their daughter and two sons of similar ages. James F. Hoge owned 17 enslaved persons in 1850, and more in 1860.

Private tutors and his grandfather educated James until General Hoge died in 1861. When James Tyler was ten, his grandmother died and his grandfather soon suffered a stroke. J. H. Tyler inherited a number of properties from his maternal grandfather, including Belle-Hampton. The teenager soon joined his father in Caroline County (his paternal grandfather dying in the same year). Because Virginia's secession embroiled Caroline County, Tyler attended a school run by Franklin Minor in Albemarle County.

On November 16, 1868, he married Sou (or Sue) Montgomery Hammet (1845–1927) of Montgomery County, Virginia. The children by that marriage were Edward Hammet Tyler, James Hoge Tyler Jr., Stockton Heth Tyler, Belle Norwood McConnell, Sue Hampton, Henry Clement Tyler, Eliza (Lily), and Eleanor.

== American Civil War ==
About 1862, when he reached the legal age of 16, J. H. Tyler enlisted in the Army of the Confederate States of America. He remained as a private until the war's end rather than accept a commission as an officer and be separated from his friends.

== Postwar career ==
After Virginia's surrender to Union forces, Tyler returned to Pulaski County and tried to resume farming. He also published articles urging manufacturing and mining development. Elected to the Virginia Senate in 1877, he urged state taxes be reduced from 50 to 40 cents and also served on the commission to settle the state debt. Tyler was a member of the boards of public buildings at Blacksburg and Marion, and became rector of the Virginia Agricultural and Mechanical College (now known as Virginia Tech).

Active in the state Democratic party, especially the statewide organization created by Senator Thomas Staples Martin, Tyler became the organization's candidate for Lieutenant Governor, and helped settle the disputed border between Maryland and Virginia. He defeated fellow Confederate veteran James Taylor Ellyson before the party's primary to become its candidate for governor in the Virginia 1897 election (and Ellyson began the first of three terms as lieutenant governor).

In the general election, voters elected Tyler Governor of Virginia. He won 64.59% of the vote, defeating Republican Patrick H. McCaull (who won 33.24% of the votes), as well as Prohibitionist L.A. Cutler, Socialist John J. Quantz, and Independent James S. Cowden. During his term as governor, Tyler reduced the public debt by more than a million dollars, but increased the public school fund by $21,000 and the literary fund by $68,000, and also reduced the tax rate from 40 to 30 cents. He also settled the boundary dispute between Tennessee and Virginia. In 1900 the Virginia legislature passed the state's first Jim Crow segregation statute, which Governor Tyler signed into law.

After his governorship, Tyler returned to Radford, where he resumed farming and lived with his son Hal (Henry C.) Tyler (who was serving as the local Commonwealth's attorney in 1910), and daughters Lily and Lucy. Tyler spent the last years of his life compiling The Family of Hoge, a genealogy of the descendants of William Hoge and Barbara Hume, his great-great-great-grandparents and the American progenitors of the Hoge Family.

A devout Presbyterian, Tyler was thrice elected to the General Assembly of the Presbyterian Church. In 1892 he was a delegate to the Pan Presbyterian Alliance in Toronto, and in 1896 became a delegate to the convention in Glasgow, Scotland, where he presided over one of the sessions. He also served on the boards of trustees of Hampden–Sydney College, the Union Theological Seminary and the Synodical Orphans Home at Lynchburg.

== Death and legacy ==
Governor J.H. Tyler died January 3, 1925, at Halwick (renamed Halwyck by subsequent owners of the property in the 1990s), which he built in 1892, and which his lawyer son Henry C. Tyler and widowed daughter Lily Wilson helped run. He was buried in Radford at West View cemetery, where his widow would join him two years later.

The Library of Virginia holds his papers. Halwyck (originally "Halwick") was added to the National Register of Historic Places in 1989. His childhood home, Blenheim, also exists, and Caroline County officials believe it eligible for similar treatment, but its private owners have not yet chosen to apply for that status, which would entail development restrictions.

Party political offices
Preceded by Charles Triplett O'Ferrall	Democratic nominee for Governor of Virginia; 1897	Succeeded by Andrew Jackson Montague
Political offices
Preceded by Charles T. O'Ferrall	Governor of Virginia; 1898–1902	Succeeded by Andrew Jackson Montague
