= 1893 Faroese general election =

Danish territorial election

Partial general elections were held in the Faroe Islands in 1893 to elect nine of the eighteen elected members of the Løgting. The Danish administrator (Amtmaður) and the local dean (Próstur) were also members, with the administrator serving as the speaker.

== Electoral system ==
Members of the Løgting were elected by first-past-the-post voting, with voters having as many votes as there were seats available in their constituency. Nine of the 18 seats were elected every two years. Voting was restricted to men aged 25 or over who met certain tax-paying criteria.

== Results ==
Constituency	Elected members	Notes
Norðoyggjar	Jens Christian Djurhuus	Re-elected
Norðoyggjar	Klæmint Olsen	Re-elected
Sandoy	Jóhan Michael Hentze	
Sandoy	Fríðrikur Petersen	
Suðuroy	Poul Næs	
Suðuroy	Johan Hendrik Schrøter	Re-elected
Suðurstreymoy	Niels Andersen	
Suðurstreymoy	Enok Bærentsen	
Suðurstreymoy	Poul Niclasen	
Source: Løgting

== Aftermath ==
Niels Andersen left the country in 1896 and was replaced by Olaf Finsen.
