= 1893 Virginia gubernatorial election =

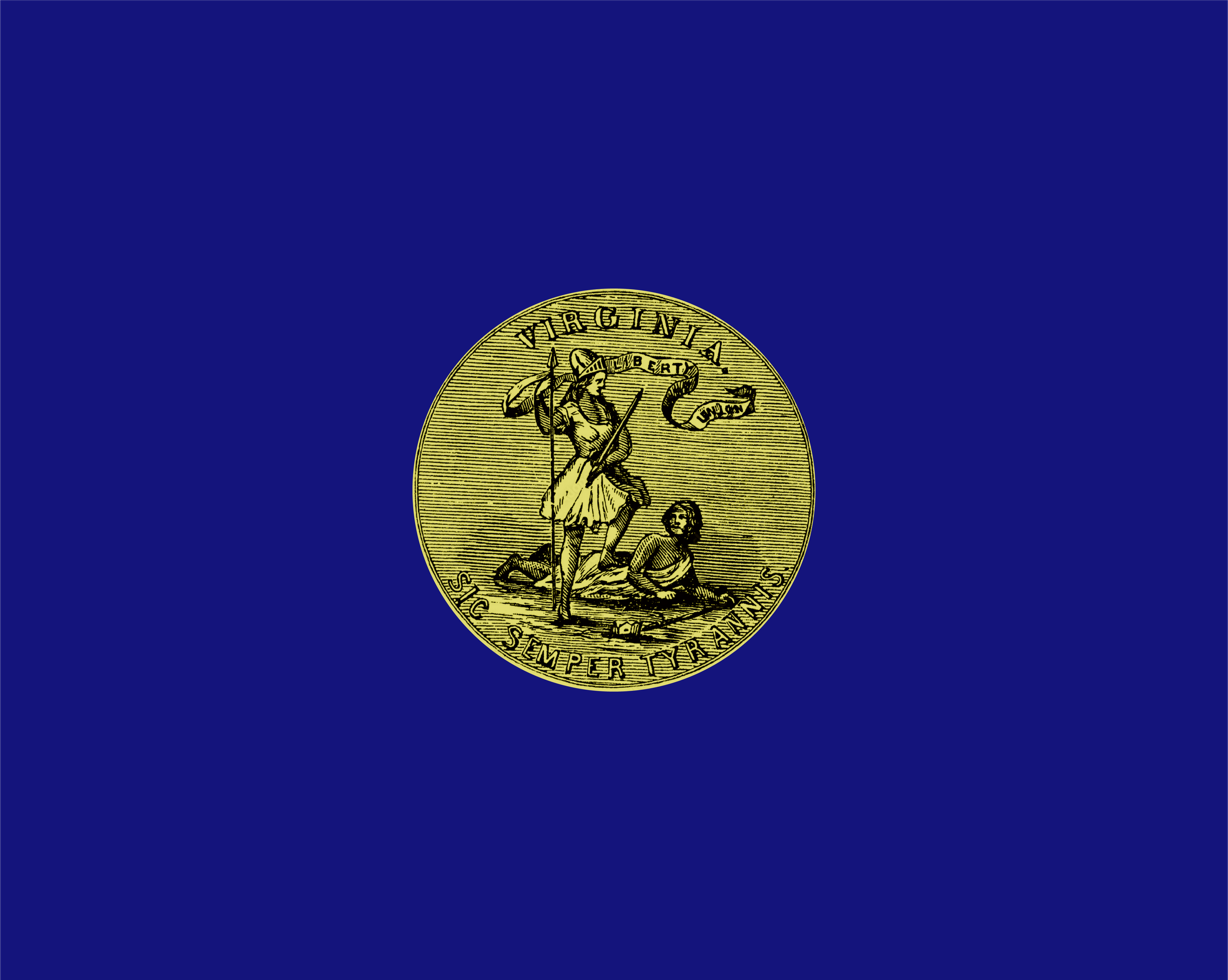
- November 7, 1893
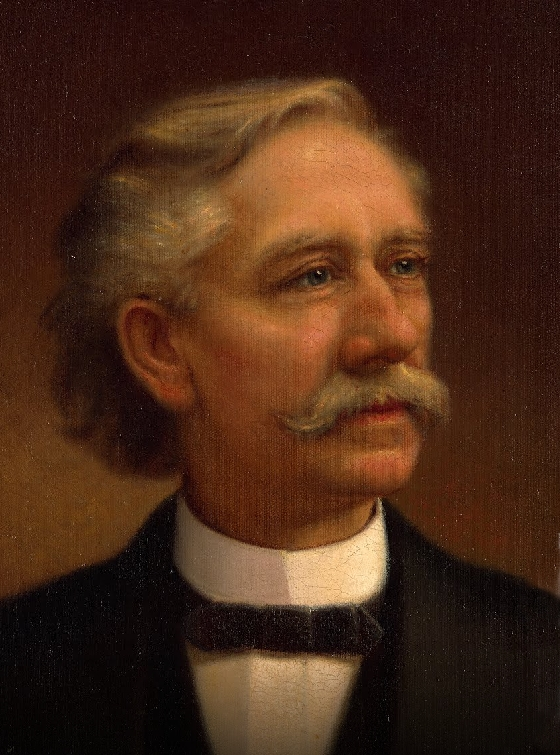

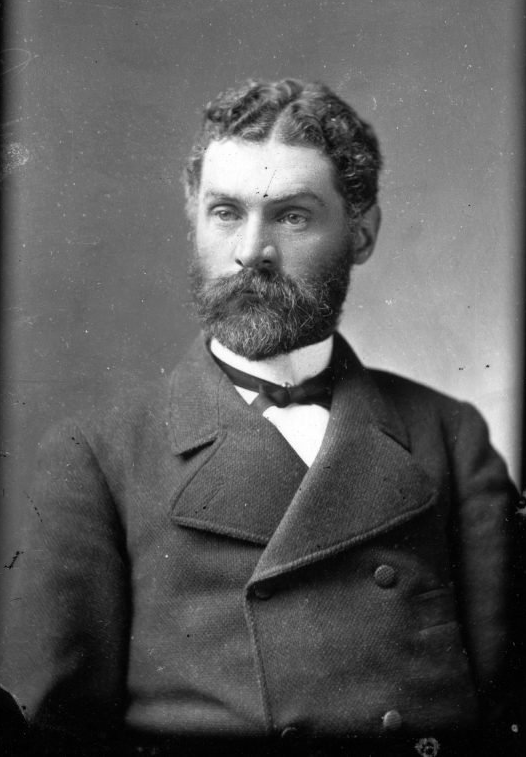
Nominee	Charles T. O'Ferrall	Edmund R. Cocke
Party	Democratic	Populist
Popular vote	128,144	79,653
Percentage	59.67%	37.09%
- County results O'Ferrall: 30–40% 40–50% 50–60% 60–70% 70–80% 80–90% >90% Cocke: 50–60% 60–70% 70–80% Tie: 40–50%
Governor before election
Philip W. McKinney
Democratic
Elected Governor
Charles T. O'Ferrall
Democratic

The 1893 Virginia gubernatorial election was held on November 7, 1893, to elect the governor of Virginia.

== Results ==
Virginia gubernatorial election, 1893
Party	Candidate	Votes	%
Democratic	Charles Triplett O'Ferrall	128,144	59.67%
Populist	Edmund R. Cocke	79,653	37.09%
Prohibition	James R. Miller	6,962	3.24%
Write-ins		13	<0.01%
Total votes		214,772	100.00%
Democratic hold			
