= 1893 Bulgarian Constitutional Assembly election =

Constitutional Assembly elections were held in Bulgaria in April 1893. The body known as the Grand National Assembly (Bulgaria: Велико народно събрание - Veliko narodno subranie) was convened for a fourth time in order to consider several amendments to the constitution, including ones concerning the religion of the monarchy and a reduction in the number of members of the National Assembly.

The existing constitution required the monarch to be a member of the Bulgarian Orthodox Church, although it exempted the first Prince. As Prince Ferdinand was the first of a new dynasty, he was considered to be exempt (as a Roman Catholic). However, as his wife, Princess Marie Louise of Bourbon-Parma, was also a Roman Catholic, if they were to have children, they would be Catholic.

The constitution also required one member of the National Assembly for every 10,000 citizens, with the proposed changes to reduce this to one for every 20,000 citizens. The amendments would also reduce the number of members of the Grand National Assembly from one for every 5,000 citizens to one for every 10,000.

The Assembly was opened on 15 May with a crowd of over 10,000 gathering for the occasion. It sat until 29 May, and approved the constitutional amendments.
