= Louis Albert Banks =

American author and pastor

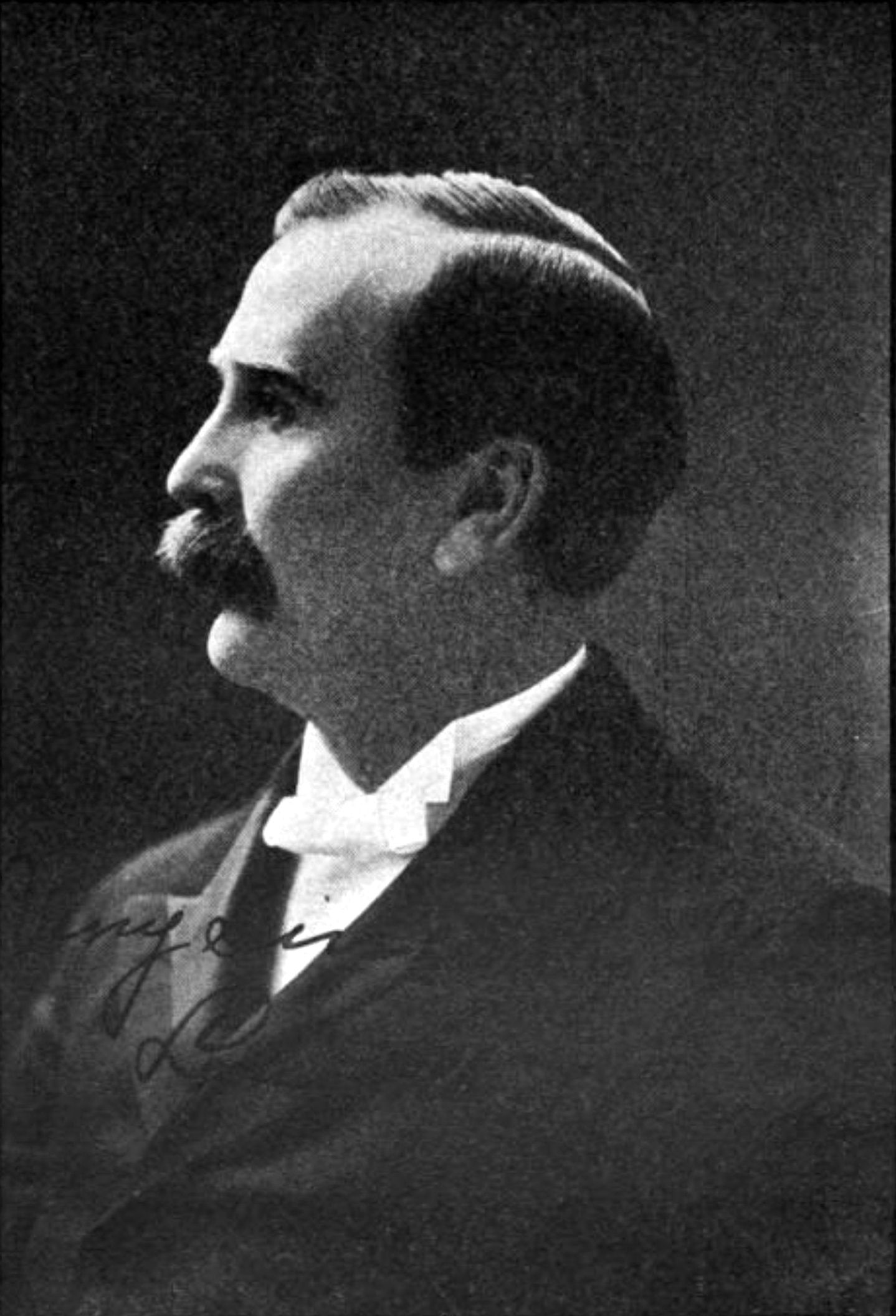
- Born: November 12, 1855

Louis Albert Banks (November 12, 1855 in Corvallis, Oregon–1933) was an American author and pastor. He was the Progressive nominee for Governor of Massachusetts in 1893.

Published Works: He wrote over 60 books, some of his published works include:

- A Year’s Prayer Meeting Talks (New York, 1899)
- Anecdotes and Morals (New York, 1894)
- Chats with Young Christians (Cleveland, 1900)
- Christ and his Friends (1896)
- Common Folks’ Religion (Boston,. 1894)
- David and his Friends (New York, 1900)
- Fresh Bait for Fishers of Men (Cleveland, 1900)
- Great Promises of the Bible (1905)
- Heavenly Trade Winds (1895)
- Hero Tales from Sacred Story (1897)
- Hidden Wells of Comfort (1901)
- Honeycomb of Life (New York, 1895)
- Immortal Hymns and Their Story (Cleveland, 1898)
- Immortal Songs of Camp and Field (Cleveland, 1899)
- Life of Rev. T. DeWitt Talmage, D.D. (1902)
- Paul and his Friends (1896)
- Poetry and Morals (New York, 1900)
- Sermon Stories for Boys and Girls (New York, 1898)
- Seven Times around Jericho (1897)
- Soul-Winning Stories (1903)
- The Christ Brotherhood: Heroic Personalities (1898)
- The Christ Dream (1896)
- The Fisherman and his Friends (1897)
- The Great Portraits of the Bible (1903)
- The Great Saints of the Bible (1901)
- The Great Sinners of the Bible (New York, 1899)
- The Healing of Souls (1902)
- The King’s Stewards (New York, 1902)
- The Lord’s Arrows (1900)
- The Motherhood of God (1901)
- The People’s Christ (Boston, 1891)
- The Religious Life of Famous Americans (1904)
- The Revival Quiver (1893)
- The Saloon-Keeper’s Ledger (1896)
- The Unexpected Christ (1898)
- The White Slaves (1892)
- Thirty-one Revival Sermons (1904)
- Unused Rainbows (Chicago, 1901)
- Windows for Sermons (1902)
- Youth of Famous Americans (1902)
