= Edmund R. Cocke =

American politician

Edmund Randolph Cocke
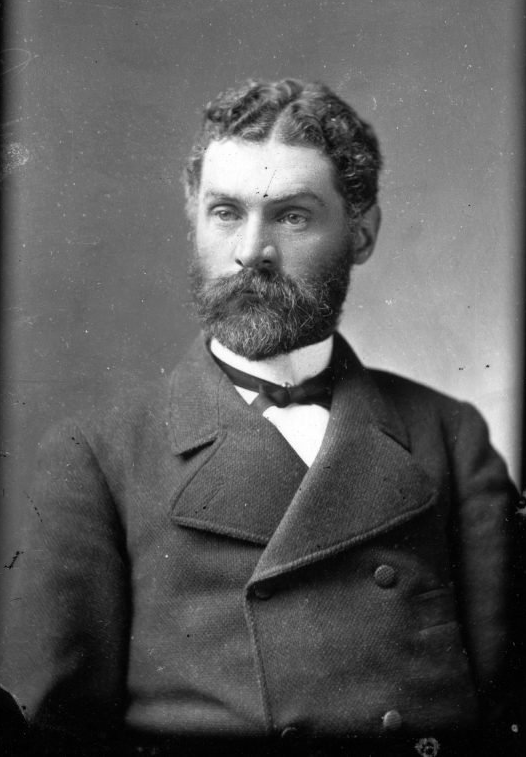
- Born: March 25, 1841; Oakland, Virginia, U.S.
- Died: February 19, 1922 (aged 80); Oakland, Virginia, U.S.
- Education: Washington and Lee University, Princeton University
- Occupations: Planter, Politician
- Known for: 1893 candidate for Governor of Virginia
- Political party: Democratic (Before 1892, 1897–1922); Populist (1892–1897)

Edmund Randolph Cocke (March 25, 1841 – February 19, 1922) was an American politician who played a significant role in the Virginia state Populist Party, which nominated him for Governor in 1893 and for Lieutenant Governor in 1897. He later became a practitioner of alchemy and opponent of alcohol prohibition.

Cocke's political routing preceded personal tragedy. On March 31, 1898 his wife died in childbirth, also claiming his newborn infant, and his cherished childhood home burned down in 1900. He sold off large portions of his land and became a practitioner of alchemy, spending years unsuccessfully attempting to make gold. Cocke strongly opposed prohibition, stating in 1919, “There are a few gentlemen in Virginia still, and they are not dominated by Methodist preachers.” Cocke died in Oakland of kidney failure on February 19, 1922.
