= Charles T. O'Ferrall =

American politician

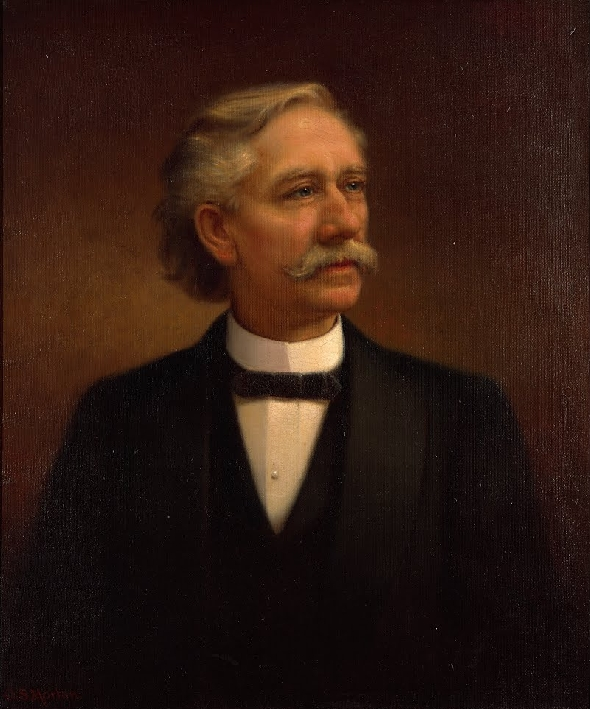

42nd Governor of Virginia
- In office January 1, 1894 – January 1, 1898
- Lieutenant: Robert Craig Kent
- Preceded by: Philip W. McKinney
- Succeeded by: James Hoge Tyler

Member of the U.S. House of Representatives from Virginia's 7th district
- In office May 5, 1884 – December 28, 1893
- Preceded by: John Paul
- Succeeded by: Smith S. Turner

Member of the Virginia House of Delegates from Rockingham County
- In office 1872–1873; Alongside George Deneale

Personal details
- Born: Charles Triplett O'Ferrall; October 21, 1840 Berkley Springs, Virginia, US
- Died: September 22, 1905 (aged 64) Richmond, Virginia, US
- Resting place: Hollywood Cemetery
- Party: Democratic
- Spouse: Jennie Wickliff Knight (m.1881)
- Children: 6
- Education: Washington College
- Profession: Politician, Lawyer

Military service
- Allegiance: Confederate States
- Branch/service: Confederate States Army
- Years of service: 1861–1865
- Rank: Colonel
- Battles/wars: American Civil War

Charles Triplett "Trip" O'Ferrall (October 21, 1840 – September 22, 1905) was a Virginia lawyer, judge and politician who fought as a cavalry officer in the Confederate States Army, then served as a U.S. representative from 1883 to 1894 and as the 42nd governor of Virginia from 1894 to 1898.

== Early and family life ==
Charles O'Ferrall was born in Brucetown, Virginia (then in Frederick County, Virginia, now near Berkeley Springs, West Virginia) to John and Jane Laurens Green O'Ferrall. His father was an innkeeper and former member of the Virginia General Assembly who was elected Clerk of Court of Morgan County in 1851, and trained his son for the job, which as described below, he received at age 17 due to his father's unexpected death. Meanwhile, O'Ferrell received an education appropriate to his class in local private schools, since Virginia had no public schools until after the American Civil War.

== Personal life ==
While recovering from one of his wounds in the American Civil War as described below, in Enterprise, Mississippi, O'Ferrall met Annie Hand, whom he married on February 8, 1865, before returning to active duty. They had two children. After her death, he married Jennie Wickliff Knight in 1881, with whom he had four more children.

== Early career ==
When John O'Ferrall died suddenly in 1855, the local judge thought highly enough of Charles O'Ferrall to appoint the fifteen-year-old to hold the clerk's post until an election could be held. Charles O'Ferrall later won an election, at seventeen, to a full six-year term as Clerk of Court. However, he only served less than half the term before the Civil War began.

== Confederate cavalry officer ==
Although Morgan County and what became West Virginia were predominantly loyal to the United States, O'Ferrall supported Virginia's decision to declare secession and joined the Confederate States Army. Enlisting as a private in the 12th Virginia Cavalry, O'Ferrall was immediately offered the position of sergeant. He subsequently distinguished himself in several battles, leading to promotion to the rank of major, and was allowed to form a cavalry battalion, the 23rd Virginia Cavalry. Eight times, O'Ferrall was wounded in battle, twice severely. The first serious wound was a shot near his heart on June 21, 1863 during the Battle of Upperville in Fauquier County. The first surgeon to treat him told him he would die, but his mother (who had been born in Fauquier County) traveled sixty miles to tend to him personally, and with the assistance of Dr. Thomas Settle of Paris, O'Ferrall survived to fight again. On September 22, 1864, in the Battle of Fisher's Hill, O'Ferrall received a severe wound near his right knee that sidelined him for several months, probably recuperating near New Market.

By the war's end, O'Ferrall held the rank of colonel and commanded all cavalry in the Shenandoah Valley. His regiment engaged in the last fight of the war on Virginia soil, dispersing Federal soldiers encamped at Pugh's Run near Woodstock.

== Lawyer and state delegate ==
After the war, O'Ferrall returned to run the family's inn. However, he found this both personally and financially unfulfilling. He decided to pursue a law degree at Washington College (later Washington and Lee University). He graduated in 1869 and started a law practice in Harrisonburg. Harrisonburg would remain his residence until 1893, when he moved to Richmond to begin his gubernatorial term. Initially he lived on East Market Street, then moved to the east side of South Main Street, nest to Judge George G. Grattan.

After former Confederates had their civil rights restored, O'Ferrall quickly returned to politics and successfully ran for the Virginia House of Delegates in 1871. However, the following year, he lost his attempt for a seat in the U.S. Congress. In 1874, fellow legislators elected O'Ferrall as a judge for Rockingham County. However, he found the job tedious and returned to his private legal practice when his six-year term ended.

== Congress ==
After several years of practicing law and assisting various Conservative Democratic candidates, O'Ferrall challenged the one-term incumbent John Paul (former Rockingham County Commonwealth attorney and state senator who ran as a Readjuster Democrat) for Virginia's 7th congressional district in 1883. The initial election vote count showed O'Ferrall down by 200 votes (out of 24,000 in a three-person race), but he contested the result and eventually won the seat. O'Ferrall subsequently won reelection five times, serving ten years in the House of Representatives (and Paul became a U.S. District judge). O'Ferrall's congressional career was largely unremarkable, though he did gain a reputation as a staunch advocate for Virginia and of Democratic President Grover Cleveland.

== Governor ==
After twice failing to win the Democratic nomination for Virginia's governor, O'Ferrall determined to make a strong push in 1893. With the support of the statewide Democratic organization formed by Virginia's U.S. Senator Thomas Staples Martin, O'Ferrall easily won the nomination. The Republicans decided not to contest the election, so O'Ferrall's only opponent was Populist Party candidate Edmund R. Cocke whom he defeated with 59.71% of the vote. O'Ferrall benefited from fears of populism and Black equality to win the election with the largest majority that any Virginia governor had ever received.

The first half of O'Ferrall's term as governor was highlighted by his willingness to use strong measures to preserve law and order. He dispatched armed forces to protect nonstriking miners and maintain peace during a miners' strike and also to drive Coxey's "army" of protest marchers out of the state. Despite his public stance as a white supremacist, O'Ferrall was also quick to send troops to break up mob violence and prevent lynchings. His actions thus defused several high-profile situations, and he remained a generally popular governor through the end of 1895.

In 1896, a Presidential election year, the issue of bimetallism and "Free Silver" dominated Democratic Party politicians, alienating O'Ferrall, who had always staunchly advocated the gold standard. The silver issue culminated in the selection of William Jennings Bryan as the Democrats' 1896 presidential candidate. O'Ferrall became one of a small group of Virginia Democrats who supported the gold standard and opposed Bryan's candidacy. This stand undermined O'Ferrall's popularity and political support and ensured that he would be a lame duck with no significant political accomplishments for the rest of his gubernatorial term. Effectively, O'Ferrall's opposition to the silver issue forced his retirement from public life.

== Electoral history ==
- 1884; O'Ferrall was elected to the U.S. House of Representatives with 56.37% of the vote, defeating Republican Dr. Joseph B. Webb.
- 1886; O'Ferrall was re-elected with 51.71% of the vote, defeating Independent Democrat John E. Roller.
- 1888; O'Ferrall was re-elected with 54.32% of the vote, defeating now-Republican Roller and Populist John C. Rivercombe.
- 1890; O'Ferrall was re-elected with 89.25% of the vote, defeating Republican I.M. Underwood.
- 1892; O'Ferrall was re-elected with 64% of the vote, defeating Populist Edmund R. Cocke.

== Final years ==
Although O'Ferrall attempted to resume his legal practice, he faced significant health issues, many attributed to his war wounds. In 1904, O'Ferrall published his autobiography titled, Forty Years of Active Service.

=== Death and legacy ===
Shortly after its publication, O'Ferrall died on September 22, 1905, in Richmond, Virginia, and was buried in the Hollywood Cemetery.

The Library of Virginia maintains his executive papers. His papers are held by the Special Collections Research Center at the College of William & Mary. Additional papers are held by the James Madison University library.

Party political offices
| Preceded by Philip W. McKinney | Democratic nominee for Governor of Virginia; 1893 | Succeeded by James Hoge Tyler |
U.S. House of Representatives
| Preceded by John Paul | Member of the U.S. House of Representatives from Virginia's 7th congressional district 1884–1893 | Succeeded by Smith S. Turner |
Political offices
| Preceded by Philip W. McKinney | Governor of Virginia; 1894–1898 | Succeeded by James Hoge Tyler |
