= Philip W. McKinney =

American politician

Philip Watkins McKinney
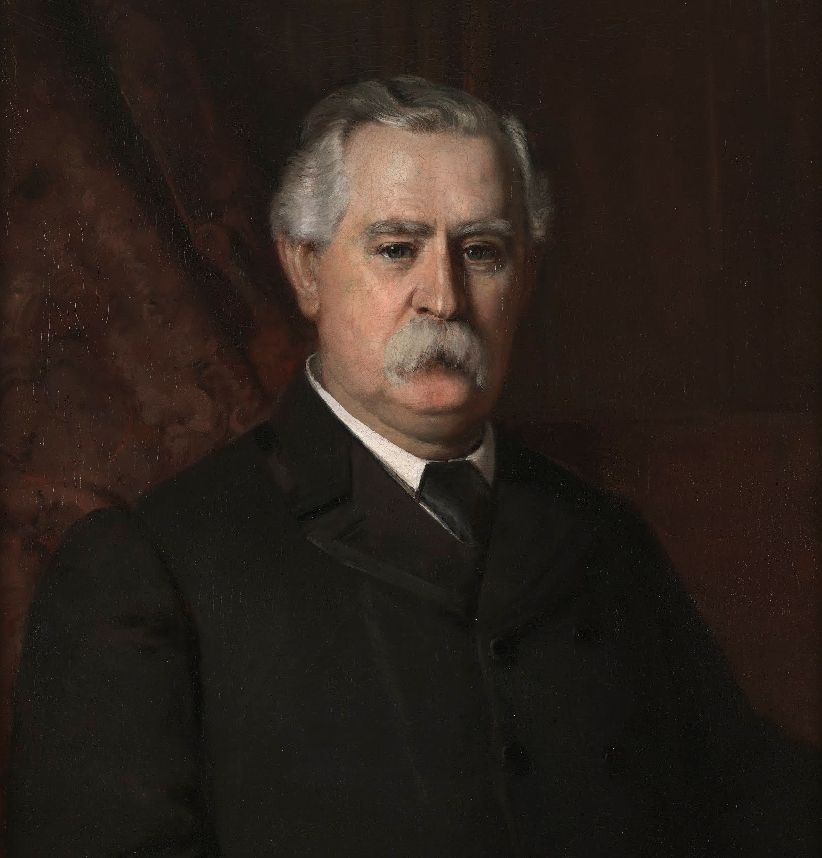

41st Governor of Virginia
- In office January 1, 1890 – January 1, 1894
- Lieutenant: James Hoge Tyler
- Preceded by: Fitzhugh Lee
- Succeeded by: Charles Triplett O'Ferrall

Member of the Virginia House of Delegates from Buckingham County
- In office December 5, 1859 – December 4, 1865
- Preceded by: William B. Shepard
- Succeeded by: William M. Cabell

Personal details
- Born: March 17, 1832 Buckingham County, Virginia, US
- Died: March 1, 1899 (aged 66) Farmville, Virginia, US
- Party: Democratic
- Spouse(s): Ann Fleming Christian (Divorced); Annie Clay
- Education: Hampden–Sydney College, Washington College

Military service
- Allegiance: Confederate States
- Branch/service: Confederate States Army
- Years of service: 1861–1863
- Unit: 4th Virginia Cavalry
- Battles/wars: American Civil War

Philip Watkins McKinney (March 17, 1832 – March 1, 1899) was an American lawyer, soldier and politician. McKinney served in the Virginia House of Delegates, was the Commonwealth attorney for Prince Edward County, and was elected as the 41st Governor of Virginia, serving from 1890 to 1894.

== Early life ==
Born in New Store, in Buckingham County, Virginia, Philip McKinney was the son of Charles and Martha McKinney. His undergraduate education was at Hampden–Sydney College, where he graduated with honors in 1851. McKinney then studied law at Washington College under John White Brockenbrough. After graduating, he started the practice of law and was married twice, first to Ann Fleming Christian and then to Annie Clay, with each marriage producing one child.

== War and politics ==
In 1858, McKinney was elected to the Virginia House of Delegates, representing Buckingham County. However, at the outbreak of the Civil War, he joined the Confederate army as an officer in Company K of the 4th Virginia Cavalry. He sustained a serious injury in 1863 at the Battle of Brandy Station, thus ending his fighting career.

After the war, McKinney started a law practice in Farmville, but soon returned to politics. He served multiple terms as the Commonwealth Attorney for Prince Edward County throughout the next twenty years. However, he also lost a number of electoral campaigns during that time, including for U.S. Congress, Virginia Attorney General and Governor.

McKinney ran for Governor for the second time in 1889, this time soundly beating Republican William Mahone, with McKinney winning 57.19% of the vote. The central theme of McKinney's gubernatorial campaign was white supremacy and the danger of African-American advancement. Once elected, his primary focus as Governor was on developing the state economy and increasing the power of the Virginia Democratic party.

After leaving office, McKinney retired to private life, settling with his wife in Farmville, Virginia. He died there in 1899 and was interred at Farmville Cemetery. His Queen-Anne-style house still stands in Farmville.

Party political offices
Preceded by Fitzhugh Lee	Democratic nominee for Governor of Virginia; 1889	Succeeded by Charles Triplett O'Ferrall
Political offices
Preceded by Fitzhugh Lee	Governor of Virginia; 1890–1894	Succeeded by Charles Triplett O'Ferrall
