= 1893 Ohio gubernatorial election =

- November 2, 1893
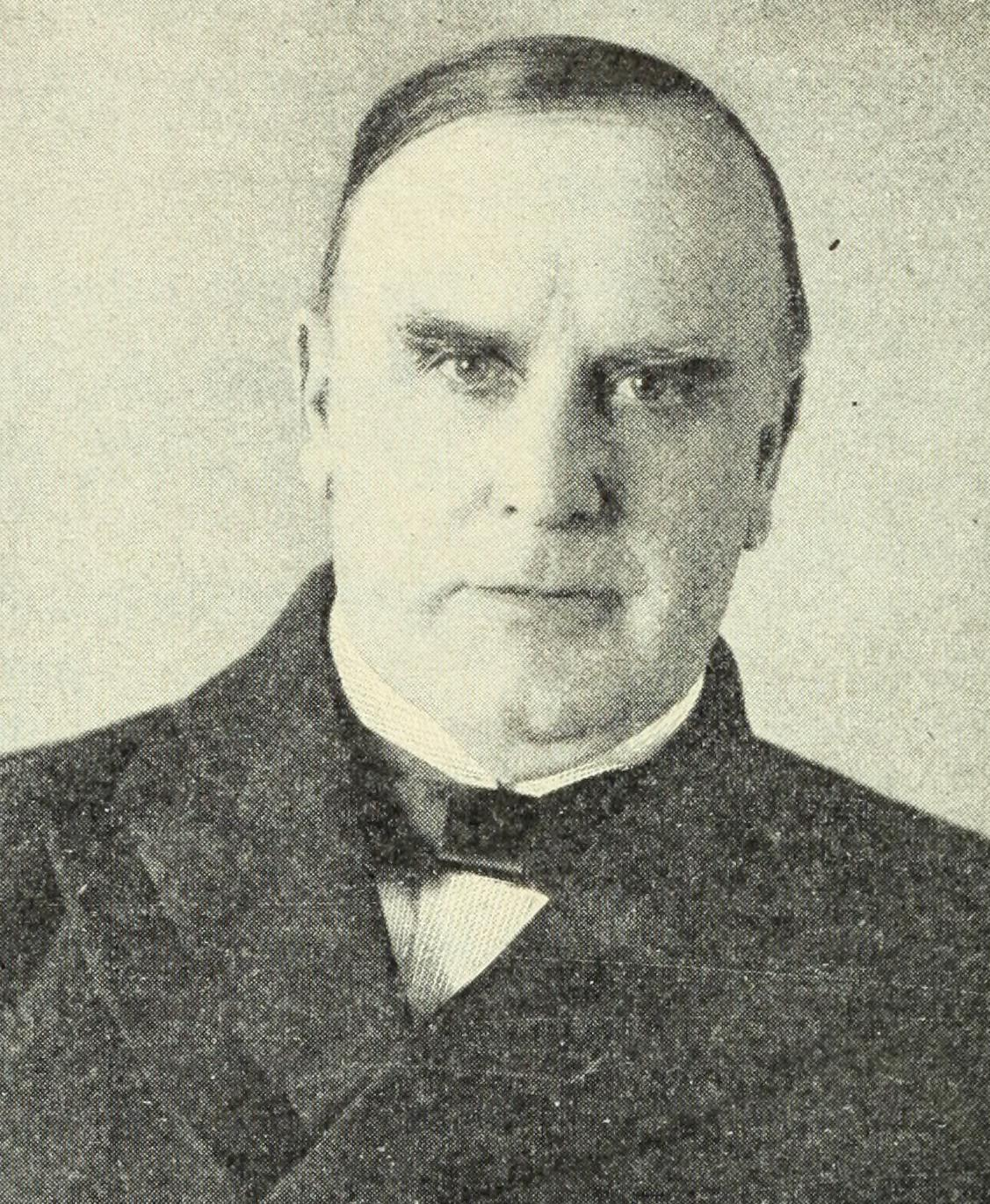

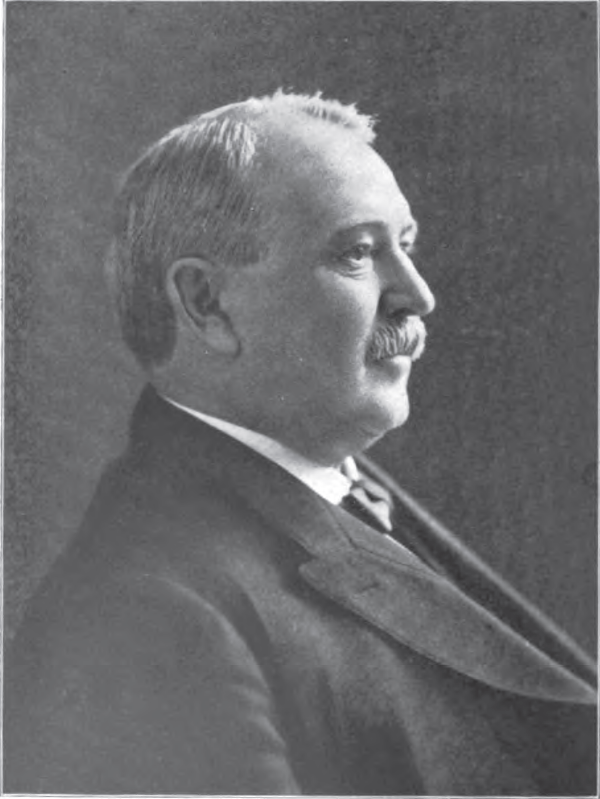
Nominee	William McKinley	Lawrence T. Neal
Party	Republican	Democratic
Popular vote	433,342	352,347
Percentage	51.86%	42.17%
- County results McKinley: 50–60% 60–70% 70–80% 80–90% Neal: 50–60% 60–70% 70–80%
Governor before election
William McKinley
Republican
Elected Governor
William McKinley
Republican

The 1893 Ohio gubernatorial election was held on November 2, 1893. Incumbent Republican William McKinley defeated Democratic nominee Lawrence T. Neal with 51.86% of the vote.

== General election ==
=== Candidates ===
Major party candidates

- William McKinley, Republican
- Lawrence T. Neal, Democratic

Other candidates

- Gideon P. Macklin, Prohibition
- Edward J. Bracken, People's

=== Results ===
1893 Ohio gubernatorial election
Party	Candidate	Votes	%	±%
Republican	William McKinley (incumbent)	433,342	51.86%	
Democratic	Lawrence T. Neal	352,347	42.17%	
Prohibition	Gideon P. Macklin	22,406	2.68%	
Populist	Edward J. Bracken	15,563	1.86%	
Majority		80,995		
Turnout				
Republican hold		Swing		
