= Ottobine, Virginia =

Unincorporated community in Virginia, US

Coordinates: 38°25′53″N 79°02′22″W

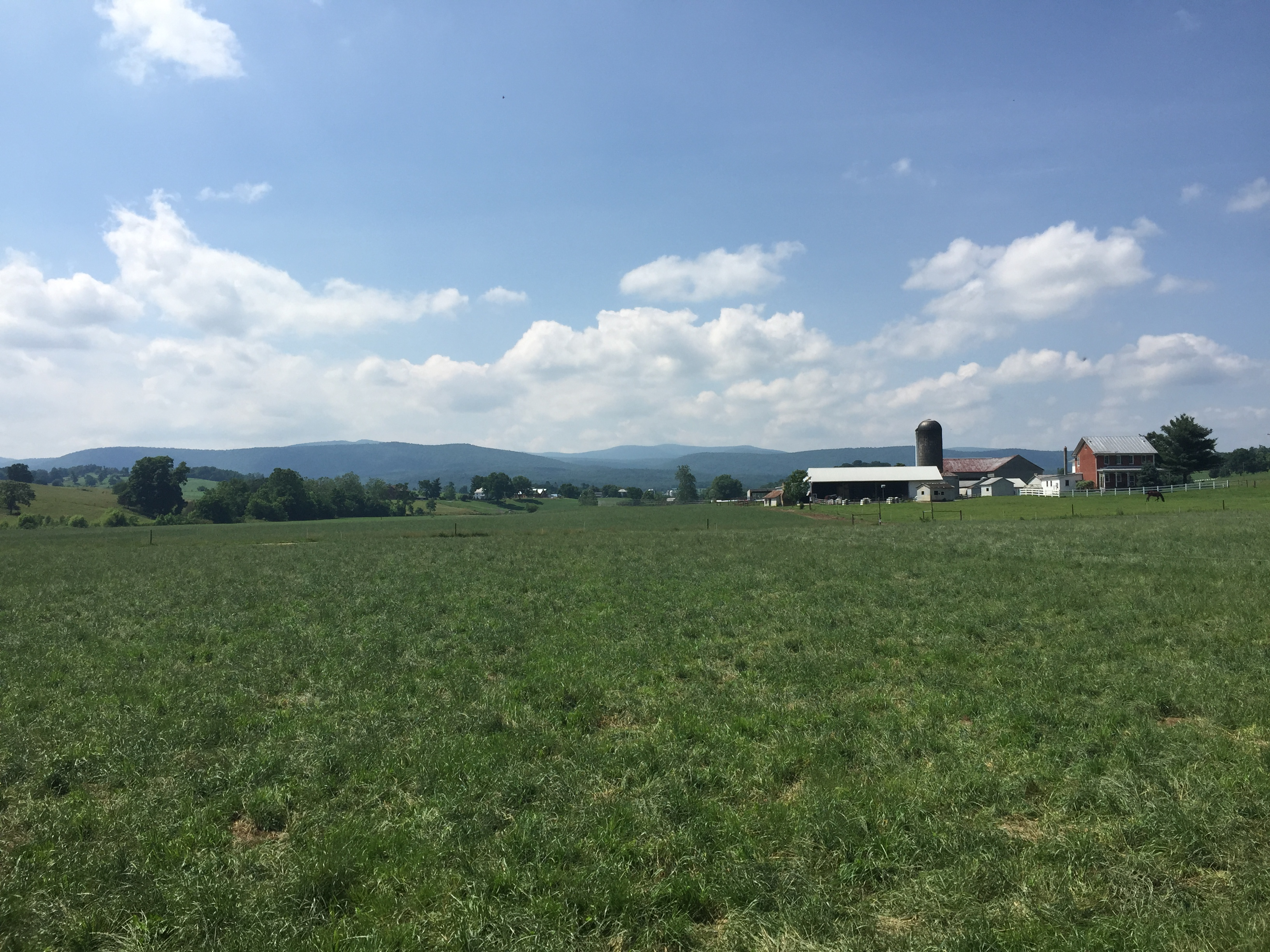
Farms in Ottobine, Virginia

Ottobine is a small unincorporated community located on State Route 257 near Harrisonburg, in Rockingham County, Virginia, United States. It consists of spread out communities, a convenience gas/grocery store, and many farms. This area is partly inhabited by Mennonites and contains many churches.
