= Braxton (surname) =

Origin
- Origin: English

Other names
- Related names: Braxtyn

Braxton is a given name of English origin meaning "badger", as well as "Brock's town".

== Notable people with the surname "Braxton" include ==
- Allen Caperton Braxton (1862–1914), American lawyer
- Anthony Braxton (born 1945), American musician
- Blanche E. Braxton, American lawyer
- Branndon Braxton (born 1985), American football player
- Carter Braxton (1736–1797), American merchant
- Carter Moore Braxton (1836–1898), American military officer
- Corbin Braxton (1792–1852), American soldier
- David Braxton (born 1965), American football player
- Derrick Drop Braxton (born 1981), American record producer
- Dhar Braxton, American singer
- Donari Braxton (born 1982), American filmmaker
- Dorothy Braxton (1927–2014), New Zealand journalist
- Elliott M. Braxton (1823–1891), American military officer
- Edward Braxton (born 1944), American bishop
- Evelyn Braxton (born 1948), American singer
- Frank Braxton (1929–1969), American animator
- Garland Braxton (1900–1966), American baseball player
- George Braxton Jr. (1734–1761), English merchant
- George Braxton Sr. (1677–1748), English merchant
- Hezekiah Braxton (1936–2013), American football player
- Janice Lawrence Braxton (born 1962), American basketball player
- Jim Braxton (1949–1986), American football player
- Joanne Braxton (born 1950), American author
- Kara Braxton (1983–2026), American basketball player
- Kayla Braxton (born 1991), American sports broadcaster
- Keith Braxton (born 1997), American basketball player
- Loretta Braxton (1934–2019), American mathematician
- P. H. A. Braxton (1852–1900), American politician
- Stephanie Braxton (born 1944), American television writer
- Tamar Braxton (born 1977), American singer
- Toni Braxton (born 1966), American singer
- Traci Braxton (1971–2022), American singer
- Trina Braxton (born 1974), American singer
- Towanda Braxton (born 1973), American actor
- Tyondai Braxton (born 1978), American musician and composer
- Tyrone Braxton (born 1964), American football player
- Van Braxton, American politician

== Fictional character ==
- Casey Braxton, a character on the soap opera Home and Away
- Darryl Braxton, a character on the soap opera Home and Away
- Heath Braxton, a character on the soap opera Home and Away
- Kyle Braxton, a character on the soap opera Home and Away
