= Corbin Braxton =

American physician

Member of the Virginia Senate for King and Queen, King William, Gloucester, Mathews and Middlesex Counties, Virginia
- In office 1837 – January 6, 1839
- Preceded by: Archibald R. Harwood
- Succeeded by: William Tod

Member of the House of Delegates for King William County, Virginia
- In office November 11, 1816 – November 30, 1818 Serving with Thomas Hill
- Preceded by: James Ruffin
- Succeeded by: Philip Aylett Jr.

Personal details
- Born: May 3, 1792 King William County, Virginia, U.S.
- Died: February 12, 1852 King William County, Virginia, U.S.
- Education: Washington College; University of Pennsylvania Medical School
- Occupation: Doctor, Soldier

Military service
- Allegiance: United States
- Years of service: 1812-1852
- Rank: Brigadier General (Virginia Militia)
- Battles/wars: War of 1812

Corbin Braxton (May 3, 1792 – February 12, 1852) was a Virginia medical doctor, planter, politician and soldier who served in both houses of the Virginia General Assembly as well as Brigadier General of the Virginia militia.

== Early life ==
Braxton was born to the former Mary Walker Carter at Hybla plantation in King William County, Virginia. Her husband George Braxton was the fourth merchant planter of that name. A member of the First Families of Virginia through both parents, his paternal great-great-grandfather George Braxton Sr. had emigrated to Virginia and become a wealthy merchant and burgess, as had his son George Braxton Jr. The most famous member of the family was his paternal grandfather, planter and founding father Carter Braxton. He received a private education appropriate to his class, including three semesters at Washington College in 1807–1808. He then studied medicine at the University of Pennsylvania in Philadelphia, graduating in 1814.

== Career ==
The Virginia Capitol at Richmond VA where 19th century Conventions met

Braxton returned to King William County where he lived on what had been his grandfather's Chericoke plantation and began his medical career, which lasted until 1830. He rebuilt the Chericoke manor house in 1828 and soon retired from medicine to concentrate on his two plantations, which he operated using enslaved labor and which included about 1400 acres. In the 1830 federal census, Braxton owned 44 slaves in King William County. A decade later, he owned 59 slaves, less than half of whom were employed in agriculture. In the last census in his lifetime, in 1850, Braxton owned 66 slaves in King William county, including 15 boys and 15 girls 10 years old or younger.

During the War of 1812, with Virginia's coast threatened by raiders, Braxton volunteered and became an officer in the Virginia militia, first as second lieutenant of an artillery company. He earned promotions to major in July 1815, lieutenant colonel in September 1817 and colonel in May 1818. Following the conflict, King William County voters elected Braxton as one of their representatives to the Virginia House of Delegates in 1816, but he only served one term. Two decades later, after Archibald Harwood resigned from the state senate, Corbin won a special election to replace him, in a district comprising the counties in the Middle Neck of Virginia. However, he did not stand for re-election.

On January 11, 1843, the Virginia General Assembly elected Braxton as Brigadier General of the 14th Brigade of the state militia. From May 1845 until 1851, Braxton also sat on the board of directors of the Virginia Military Institute. Despite personal health issues, in 1850 Braxton won election to the Virginia Constitutional Convention of 1850. He was one of five delegates elected from the central Piedmont delegate district made up of his home district of King William County, as well as Caroline, Spotsylvania, and Hanover Counties. Braxton opposed reforms sought by western Virgininans, and voted against the constitution the convention approved on July 31, 1851.

== Personal life ==
On February 12, 1824, Braxton married Marry Williamson Tomlin. Although one son and one daughter died young, two other sons and three daughters survived to adulthood.

== Death ==
On February 12, 1852, Corbin Braxton suffered a hemorrhage of the lungs at Williams Ferry in King William County, having traveled there to attend a sick woman. His gravesite has been lost, but probably was at his Chericoke plantation, which remains today and is listed on the National Register of Historic Places. His grandson Allen Caperton Braxton continued the family's political tradition.

== Bibliography ==
- Pulliam, David Loyd (1901). The Constitutional Conventions of Virginia from the foundation of the Commonwealth to the present time. John T. West, Richmond. ISBN 978-1-2879-2059-5.
