= George Braxton =

George Braxton may refer to:

- George Braxton Sr. (1677–1748), merchant, planter, and politician in the Virginia colony
- George Braxton Jr. (1734–1761), merchant, planter, and politician in Virginia
