= Braxton =

Braxton may refer to:

== Places in the United States ==
- Braxton, Mississippi, a village
- Braxton County, West Virginia

== People ==
- Braxton (given name), a list of people with the given name
- Braxton (surname), a list of people with the surname

== Other uses ==
- The Braxtons, an American R&B girl group
- USS Braxton (APA-138), a World War II attack transport
