= Brax =

Brax is the name of the following communes in France:

- Brax, Haute-Garonne, in the Haute-Garonne department
  - Château de Brax, castle in the commune of Brax, France
- Brax, Lot-et-Garonne, in the Lot-et-Garonne department

Brax may also refer to

- Brax, a shortened moniker associated with C.S. General Braxton Bragg
- Brax (game) a fairly simple abstract strategy board game
- Admiral Brax, a fictional character and villain in the 2019 comic series Chrononauts: Futureshock
- Darryl "Brax" Braxton a fictional character from the soap opera Home and Away.
- Tuija Brax (born 1965), Finnish politician and minister

== See also ==
- Braxton (disambiguation)
