= Elliott M. Braxton =

American politician (1823–1891)

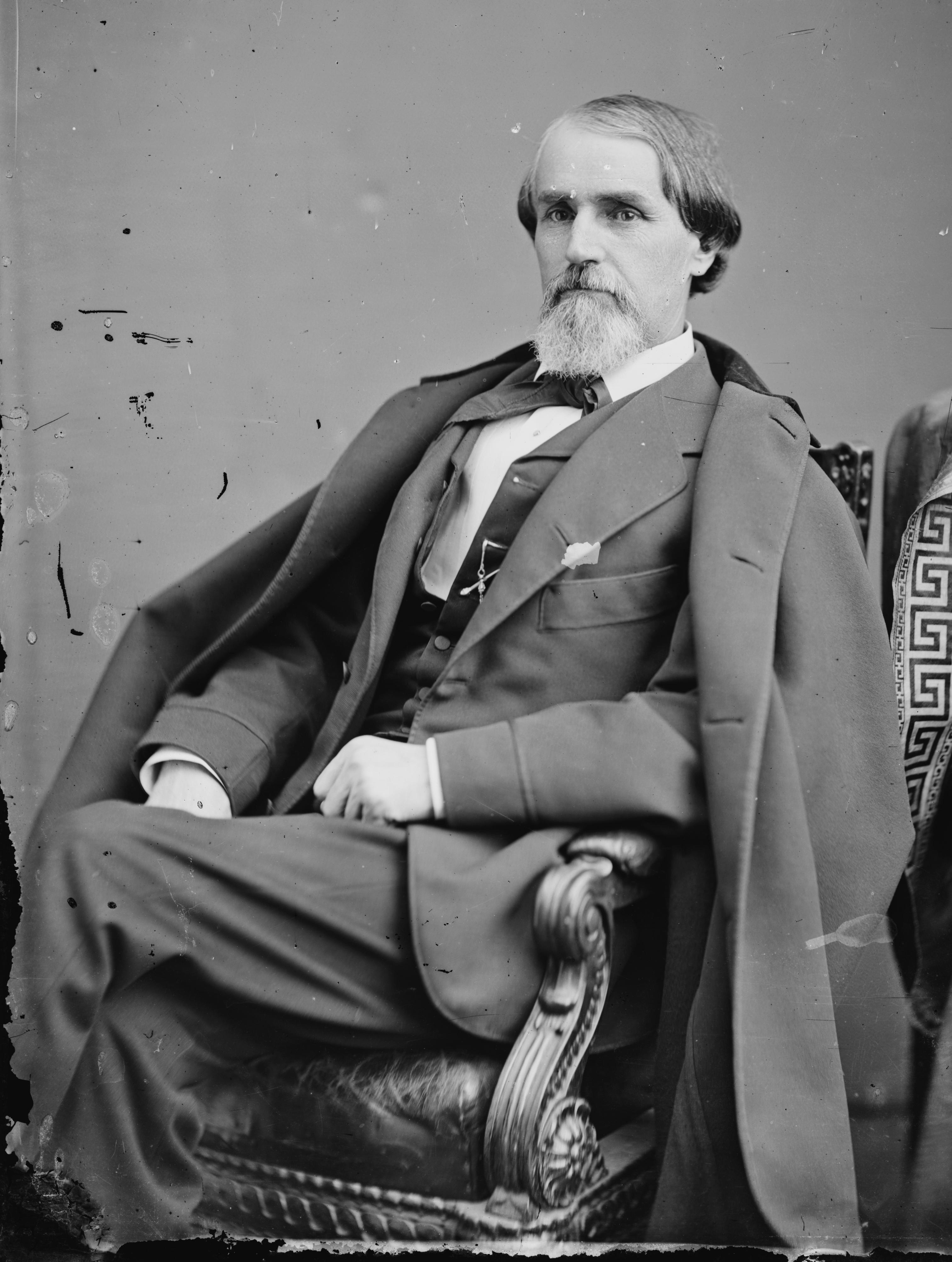

Member of the U.S. House of Representatives from Virginia's 7th district
- In office March 4, 1871 – March 3, 1873
- Preceded by: Lewis McKenzie
- Succeeded by: John T. Harris

Member of the Virginia Senate from Richmond, Northumberland and Westmoreland Counties
- In office 1852–1857
- Preceded by: District established
- Succeeded by: Richard L. T. Beale

Personal details
- Born: October 8, 1823 Mathews, Virginia, U.S.
- Died: October 2, 1891 (aged 67) Fredericksburg, Virginia, U.S.
- Resting place: Confederate Cemetery; Fredericksburg, Virginia, U.S.
- Party: Democratic
- Profession: Politician, Lawyer

Elliott Muse Braxton (October 8, 1823 – October 2, 1891) was a nineteenth-century politician and lawyer from Virginia. He owned slaves, served in the Confederate Army, and was a Democrat. He was the great-grandson of slaveowner and United States Declaration of Independence signer Carter Braxton.

== Early life ==
Born either in Mathews County or Fredericksburg, Virginia, to Carter Moore Braxton Sr., Elliott lost his mother as child. His father remarried and his younger half-brother was Carter Moore Braxton. The Braxton family of merchants and planters had long been prominent in King and Queen County which his great-great-grandfather George Braxton, Sr., great-grandfather George Braxton, Jr. and grandfather Carter Braxton had represented in the Virginia General Assembly, and where the family owned large plantations. He received a private education appropriate to his class, although his father died when in 1847.

== Career ==
After reading law under his father's guidance until the elder C.M. Braxton died in 1847, E. M. Braxton was admitted to the bar in 1849, and began a legal practice in Richmond County, Virginia, in the Northern Neck of Virginia where his extended family remained influential.

Richmond, Lancaster, Northumberland and Westmoreland County voters elected Braxton to the Virginia Senate in 1851 to replace Joseph Harvey in a district which before the census and Virginia Constitutional Convention redistricting previously had also included Stafford County and King George Counties and he served from 1852 to 1856 (succeeded by R.L.T. Beale). He defeated Whig John T. Rice of Westmoreland county in 1853. While in the state senate, Braxton sat on the Committee for Courts of Justice and the Joint Committee to Examine the First Auditor's Office, but decided against seeking re-election in 1857.

In the 1850 census, Braxton enslaved a woman in Richmond, as well as ten and three-year-old girls and a five year old and year old and boy. In the previous census, his father had enslaved 20 people in King and Queen County. In the 1860 census, Braxton probably leased out his remaining slaves, including a 45 year old enslaved man in Northumberland County, Virginia and a 30-year-old man in Richmond County.

In 1860, his legal practice not flourishing, Braxton moved to Fredericksburg, Virginia, where his half brother Carter Moore Braxton, now a civil engineer, was overseeing the construction of the roadbed for the Fredericksburg and Gordonsville Railroad. Elliott Braxton continued practicing law and lived with his wife and three young daughters.

As Virginians voted to secede from the Union at the outbreak of the Civil War, Braxton enlisted as a private, then raised a company in Stafford County for the Confederate Army. On July 18, 1861, he was elected its captain and his company merged into the 30th Virginia Infantry in September 1861. He was re-elected Captain on April 16, 1862. In August 1862 Braxton was promoted to a major and assigned as brigade quartermaster on the staff of General John R. Cooke, despite an attempt to obtain an army judicial post in the autumn of 1864.

Following the conflict, Braxton returned to Fredericksburg and opened a law office with C. WIstar Wallace, with whom he had served in the 30th Virginia. He had his legal disability removed and won election to Fredericksburg's common council in 1866; the state's government was reorganized in 1868 due to Congressional Reconstruction.

Braxton ran as a Conservative for Congress from the 7th district and defeated Republican incumbent Lewis McKenzie by a margin of 53-47%. McKenzie challenged the result on the ground of voter intimidation. Nonetheless, the Committee on Elections determined Braxton had won and seated him. Following redistricting, Braxton ran in the 1st district against Republican lawyer and newspaperman James B. Sener, this time losing by a narrow margin of 49-51% (373 votes). While in Congress, Braxton served on no committees, but spoke in defense of states' rights and the Conservative Party. He moved unsuccessfully to compensate the Lee family for Arlington plantation the federal government had seized during the Civil War.

Braxton resumed practicing law in Fredericksburg, despite suffering from heart disease beginning in the 1880s.

== Personal life ==
On November 23, 1854, Braxton married Anna Maria Marshall, granddaughter of jurist John Marshall. They had four daughters and four sons.

== Death ==
Braxton died in his Fredericksburg home on October 2, 1891, and was interred there in the Confederate Cemetery.

Virginia House of Delegates
| Preceded by District established | Virginia Senate; 1852–1857 | Succeeded by Richard L. T. Beale |
U.S. House of Representatives
| Preceded by Lewis McKenzie | Member of the U.S. House of Representatives from Virginia's 7th congressional district March 4, 1871 – March 3, 1873 | Succeeded by John T. Harris |
