= Carter Moore Braxton =

Confederate artillery officer (1836–1898)

Carter M. Braxton
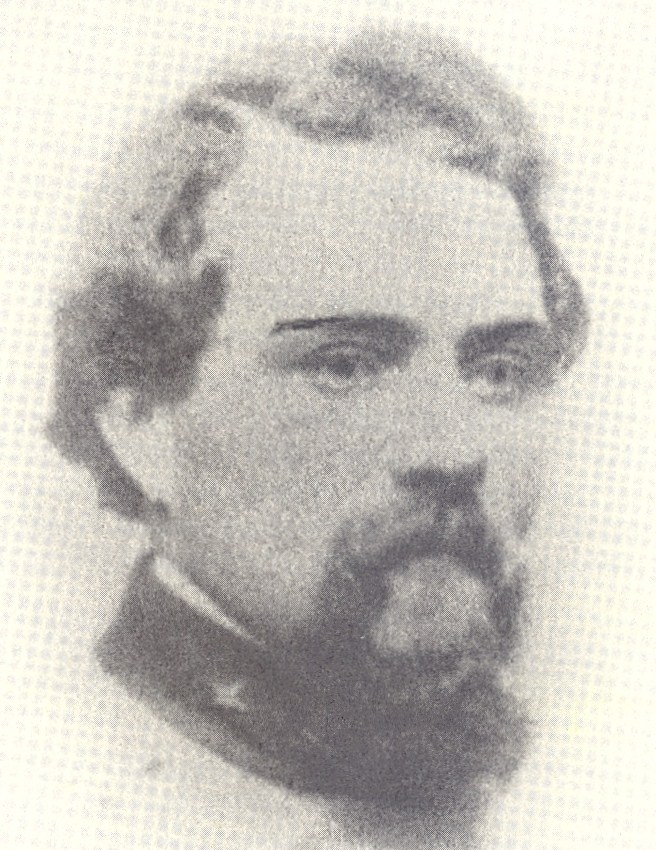
- Born: September 5, 1836; Norfolk, Virginia, U.S.
- Died: May 27, 1898 (aged 61); Newport News, Virginia, U.S.
- Burial place: Greenlawn Cemetery
- Education: Hanover Academy
- Military career
- Allegiance: Confederate States of America
- Branch: Confederate States Army
- Rank: Lieutenant colonel
- Battles: American Civil War; Seven Days Battles; Battle of Cedar Mountain; Second Battle of Manassas; Battle of Chantilly; Battle of Antietam; Battle of Fredericksburg; Battle of Chancellorsville; Battle of Mine Run; Battle of the Wilderness; Battle of Cold Harbor; Battle of Hatcher's Run; Battle of Five Forks

Carter Moore Braxton Jr. (1836–1898) was an American civil engineer and businessman in the Hampton Roads area of Virginia, and a Confederate artillery officer, rising to the rank of lieutenant colonel during the American Civil War.

== Early and family life ==
Carter Moore Braxton Jr. was born in Norfolk, Virginia on September 5, 1836, the son of Virginia legislator and planter Carter Moore Braxton Sr. by his third wife, Elizabeth Teagle Mayo Braxton. Elliott Muse Braxton was his elder half brother. The Braxton family of merchants and planters had long been prominent in King and Queen County which his great-great grandfather George Braxton, Sr., great-grandfather George Braxton, Jr. and grandfather Carter Braxton had represented in the Virginia General Assembly, and where the family owned large plantations.

C.M. Braxton Sr. soon moved his family from Norfolk back to King and Queen County, where his father owned 20 slaves in the 1840 federal census. There Carter Moore Braxton Sr. died in 1847, when this boy was eleven. C.M. Braxton finished his education at the Hanover Academy, then moved to Fredericksburg. There he rose to become chief engineer in charge of construction for the Fredericksburg and Gordonsville Railroad by the start of the American Civil War, but only grading had begun. A Carter Braxton, either this man or a relative, owned 94 slaves in the eastern district of Hanover County in 1850.

== Military career ==
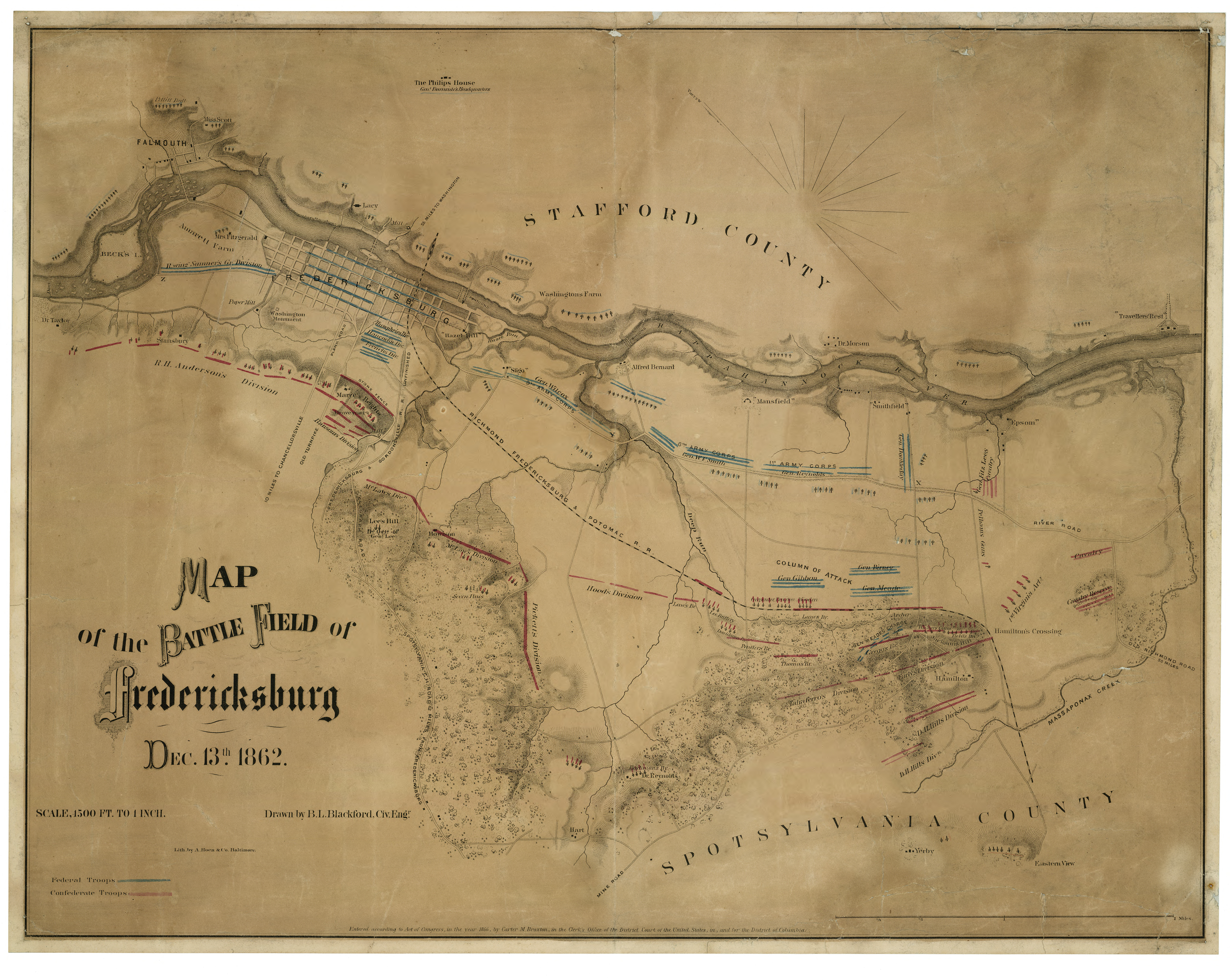
Map of the Battle Field of Fredericksburg, Dec 13, 1862

During the American Civil War he enlisted in the forces of the Confederacy, and on May 8, 1861, was made captain of the artillery company from Fredericksburg which became known as Braxton's Battery. About a year later he was appointed chief of artillery on the staff of General A. P. Hill, in which capacity he served throughout the war.

During the Civil War, Braxton fought in the Seven Days Battles, the Second Battle of Manassas and the battles of Cedar Mountain, Chantilly, Antietam, Fredericksburg, Chancellorsville, Mine Run, the Wilderness, Cold Harbor, Hatcher's Run, and Five Forks.

Braxton was frequently in the heat of battle, and one later account states that he had seven horses killed under him in the course of the war. However, he was never wounded in action. After the war he prepared for publication a Map of the Battle Field of Fredericksburg, Explained by Extracts from Official Reports (1866).

== Civilian life ==
During his residence and up to the time of his death he was connected with many important enterprises of Newport News and when the Chesapeake and Ohio Railway was extended to that city from Richmond he was chief engineer of the work. He was also the first president of the First National Bank and at the time of his death was vice-president of the Newport News Gas Company. For many years he was an active member of the First Baptist Church.

== Death ==
Following the conflict, Braxton moved to Newport News and lived there till death. He died of Bright's disease in Newport News on May 27, 1898, in his sixty-first year. His wife and five children were with him when he died. He was buried in the local Greenlawn Cemetery.

== Sources ==
- Lane, Martin S. (December 22, 2021). "Carter M. Braxton (1836–1898)". In Encyclopedia Virginia. Virginia Humanities. Retrieved October 20, 2022.
- "Col. C. M. Braxton Dead". The Daily Star. May 28, 1898. p. 3.
- "Col. Braxton Dead". Daily Press. May 28, 1898. p. 1.
- "Braxton's Battery". The Daily Times. December 17, 1898. p. 4.
