= Virginia's 7th congressional district =

U.S. House district for Virginia

Coordinates: 37°58′05″N 77°44′48″W

- Interactive map of district boundaries since 2023
- Representative: Eugene Vindman; D–Dale City
- Area: 3,117.9 mi^{2} (8,075 km^{2})
- Distribution: 73.1% urban; 26.9% rural
- Population (2025): 845,364
- Median household income: $120,170
- Ethnicity: 53.5% White; 20.4% Black; 17.4% Hispanic; 11.3% Two or more races; 9.6% other; 5.3% Asian
- Cook PVI: D+2

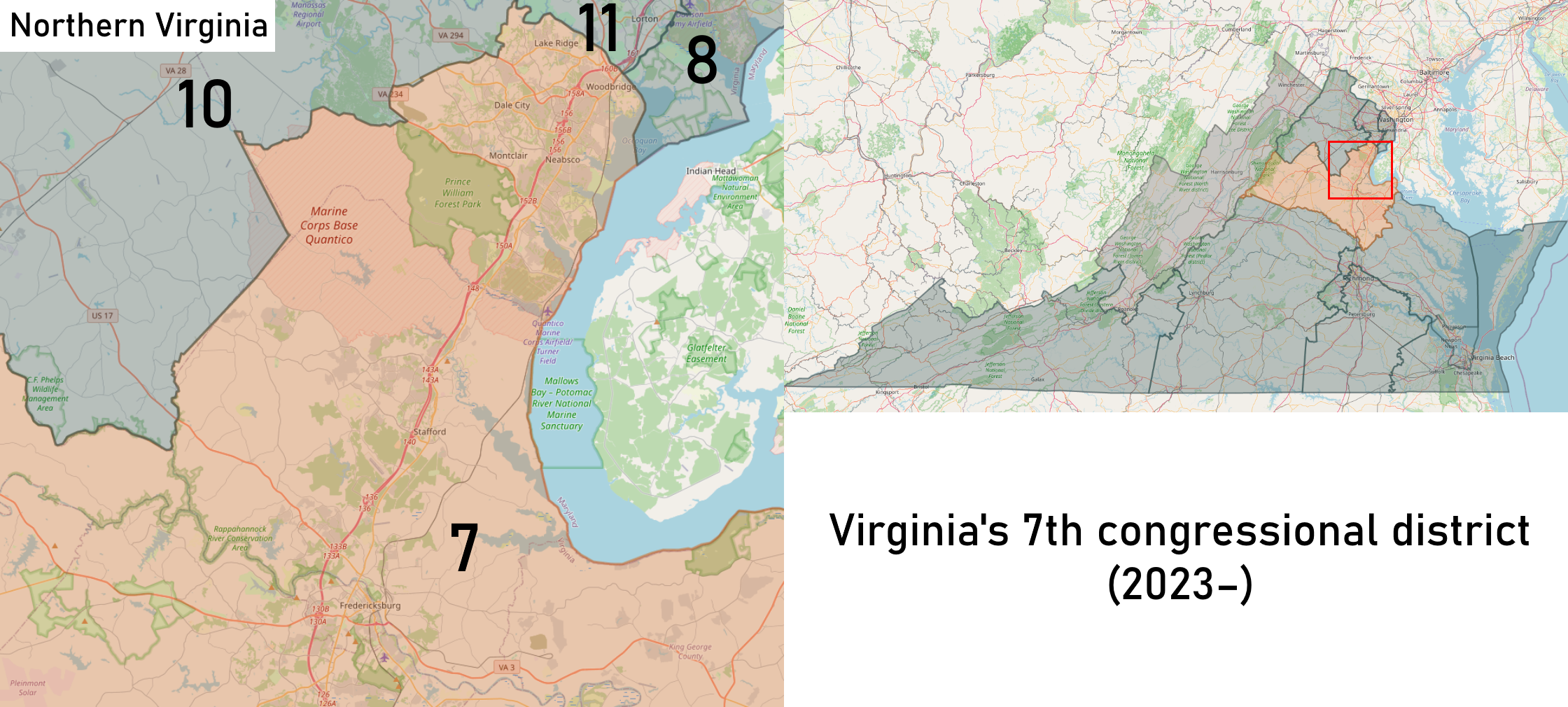
Virginia's 7th congressional district from January 3, 2023

Virginia's seventh congressional district is a United States congressional district in the Commonwealth of Virginia. The district encompasses a vast swath of Northern and Central Virginia, including many suburban, urban, and rural areas. The district includes the city of Fredericksburg, along with the towns of Bowling Green and Culpeper. Considered among the nation's most competitive congressional districts, it has been represented by Democrat Eugene Vindman since 2025.

The district spans across much of Central and Northern Virginia including all of Orange, Culpeper, Spotsylvania, Greene County, Madison County, Fredericksburg, Caroline County, King George County, Stafford County, the south-eastern half of Prince William County, and a small sliver of Albemarle County.

== History ==
Until 1970, the 7th district comprised the northern half of the Shenandoah Valley, now part of the strongly Republican 6th district. After the 1970 census, it was redrawn to give up most of the Valley except for Winchester, and pick up Manassas and Fredericksburg, thus stretching from the fringes of the Washington, D.C. suburbs to Charlottesville.

This iteration of the 7th was one of the first areas of Virginia to shake off its Solid South roots. The area's Democrats started splitting their tickets as early as the 1930s. The Republicans took the seat in 1970, and held it without much difficulty until 1993, during the period when mamy conservative white Southerners shifted to the Republican Party.

The district's current configuration dates from 1993, when Virginia was forced to create a majority-minority district by a Justice Department directive pursuant to the Voting Rights Act. At that time, most of Richmond, which had been entirely in the old 3rd district for over a century, was shifted to a newly created 3rd district. The remaining territory in the old 3rd was combined with some more rural areas to the north to form the new 7th district.

From 2013 to 2017, with redrawing of the 7th district, it stretched from the west end of Richmond through the wealthier portions of Henrico and Chesterfield counties; it also took in all of Goochland, Hanover, Louisa, New Kent, Orange, in Culpeper, Page and Rappahannock counties and a portion of Spotsylvania County.

In 2016, the adjacent 3rd district was found to be unconstitutional, leading to court-ordered redistricting, which changed the 7th district for the 2016 elections.

From 2017 to 2023, the district spanned much of Central Virginia, including all of Orange, Culpeper, Goochland, Louisa, Nottoway, Amelia, and Powhatan counties. The district also included large portions of Chesterfield and Henrico counties in the suburbs of Richmond. However, Richmond was not in the 7th. Spotsylvania County also had a large portion in the 7th district just outside of Fredericksburg.

== Demographics ==
According to the United States Census Bureau's 2017 data for Virginia's 7th Congressional District, the total population of the district is 790,084. Median age for the district is 39.7 years. 65.5% of the district is Non-Hispanic White, 18.4% Black, 5.1% Asian, 0.3% Native American or Alaskan, and 3.4% some other race with 7.3% Hispanic or Latino. Owner-occupied housing is 73.0% and renter-occupied housing is 27.0%. The median value of single-family owner-occupied homes is $266,500. 91.6% of the district population has at least a high school diploma, 40.4% at least a bachelor's degree or higher. 9.1% of the district are civilian veterans. 9.1% are foreign born and 11.9% speak a language other than English at home. 9.9% are of disability status. 68.2% of the district is in the labor force, which consists of those 16 years and older. Mean travel time to work is 29.3 minutes. Median household income is $77,533. Per capita income is $37,567. 5.3% of the population account for families living below the poverty level, and 7.7% of individuals live below the poverty level. 9.5% of children live below the poverty line.

== Recent election results ==
=== 1992–2002 ===
==== 2000 ====
2000 Virginia's 7th congressional district election
Party	Candidate	Votes	%	±%
Republican	Eric Cantor	192,652	66.9	
Democratic	Warren Stewart	94,935	33.0	
Write-in		304	0.1	
Majority		97,717	33.9	
Total votes		287,891	100.0	
Republican hold		Swing		

=== 2002–2012 ===
==== 2002 ====
2002 Virginia's 7th congressional district election
Party	Candidate	Votes	%
Republican	Eric Cantor (incumbent)	113,658	69.4
Democratic	Ben Jones	49,854	30.5
Write-in		153	0.1
Majority		63,804	39.0
Total votes		163,665	100.0
Republican win (new boundaries)			

==== 2004 ====
2004 Virginia's 7th congressional district election
Party	Candidate	Votes	%	±%
Republican	Eric Cantor (incumbent)	230,765	75.5	+6.1
Independent	Brad Blanton	74,325	24.3	N/a
Write-in		568	0.2	+0.1
Majority		156,440	51.2	+12.2
Total votes		305,658	100.0	
Republican hold		Swing	–9.1	

==== 2006 ====
2006 Virginia's 7th congressional district election
Party	Candidate	Votes	%	±%
Republican	Eric Cantor (incumbent)	163,706	63.8	–11.6
Democratic	Jim Nachman	88,206	34.4	N/a
Independent	Brad Blanton	4,213	1.6	–22.7
Write-in		272	0.1	–0.1
Majority		156,440	51.2	–21.7
Total votes		256,397	100.0	
Republican hold		Swing	–23.0	

==== 2008 ====
2008 Virginia's 7th congressional district election
Party	Candidate	Votes	%	±%
Republican	Eric Cantor (incumbent)	233,531	62.7	–1.1
Democratic	Anita Hartke	138,123	37.1	+2.7
Write-in		683	0.2	+0.1
Majority		95,408	25.6	–3.8
Total votes		372,337	100.0	
Republican hold		Swing	–1.9	

==== 2010 ====
2010 Virginia's 7th congressional district election
Party	Candidate	Votes	%	±%
Republican	Eric Cantor (incumbent)	138,209	59.2	–3.5
Democratic	Rick Waugh	79,616	34.1	–3.0
Green	Floyd Bayne	15,164	6.5	N/a
Write-in		413	0.2	–0.0
Majority		58,593	25.1	–0.5
Total votes		233,402	100.0	
Republican hold		Swing	–0.3	

=== 2012–2016 ===
==== 2012 ====
2012 Virginia's 7th congressional district election
Party	Candidate	Votes	%
Republican	Eric Cantor (incumbent)	222,983	58.4
Democratic	Wayne Powell	158,012	41.4
Write-in		914	0.2
Majority			
Total votes		381,909	100.0
Republican win (new boundaries)			

==== 2014 ====
2014 Virginia's 7th congressional district election
Party	Candidate	Votes	%	±%
Republican	David Brat	148,026	60.8	
Democratic	Jack Trammell	89,914	36.9	
Libertarian	James Carr	5,086	2.1	N/a
Write-in		325	0.1	
Majority				
Total votes		243,351	100.0	
Republican hold		Swing		

=== 2016–2022 ===
==== 2016 ====
2016 Virginia's 7th congressional district election
Party	Candidate	Votes	%
Republican	David Brat (incumbent)	218,057	57.5
Democratic	Eileen Bedell	160,159	42.2
Write-in		947	0.2
Majority			
Total votes		379,163	100.0
Republican win (new boundaries)			

==== 2018 ====
2018 Virginia's 7th congressional district election
Party	Candidate	Votes	%	±%
Democratic	Abigail Spanberger	176,079	50.3	
Republican	David Brat (incumbent)	169,295	48.4	
Libertarian	Joe Walton	4,216	1.2	N/a
Write-in		213	0.1	
Majority				
Total votes		349,831	100.0	
Democratic gain from Republican		Swing		

==== 2020 ====
2020 Virginia's 7th congressional district election
Party	Candidate	Votes	%	±%
Democratic	Abigail Spanberger (incumbent)	230,893	50.8	
Republican	Nick Freitas	222,623	49.0	
Write-in		823	0.2	
Majority				
Total votes		454,339	100.0	
Democratic hold		Swing		

=== 2022–present ===
==== 2022 ====
2022 Virginia's 7th congressional district election
Party	Candidate	Votes	%
Democratic	Abigail Spanberger (incumbent)	143,357	52.2
Republican	Yesli Vega	130,586	47.6
Write-in		647	0.2
Majority			
Total votes		274,590	100.0
Democratic win (new boundaries)			

==== 2024 ====
2024 Virginia's 7th congressional district election
Party	Candidate	Votes	%	±%
Democratic	Eugene Vindman	203,336	51.18	
Republican	Derrick Anderson	192,847	48.54	
Write-in		1,116	0.28	
Majority				
Total votes		397,299	100.00	
Democratic hold		Swing		

== Recent election results from statewide races ==
Year	Office	Results
2008	President	McCain 53% - 46%
2008	Senate	Warner 64% - 35%
2009	Governor	McDonnell 63% - 37%
2009	Lt. Governor	Bolling 60% - 39%
2009	Attorney General	Cuccinelli 58% - 42%
2012	President	Romney 57% - 42%
2012	Senate	Allen 55% - 45%
2013	Governor	Cuccinelli 52% - 38%
2013	Lt. Governor	Northam 51% - 49%
2013	Attorney General	Obenshain 58% - 42%
2014	Senate	Gillespie 56% - 41%
2016	President	Trump 50% - 44%
2017	Governor	Gillespie 51% - 48%
2017	Lt. Governor	Vogel 53% - 47%
2017	Attorney General	Adams 53% - 47%
2018	Senate	Kaine 52% - 46%
2020	President	Biden 50% - 49%
2020	Senate	Warner 51% - 49%
2021	Governor	Youngkin 55% - 44%
2021	Lt. Governor	Earle-Sears 55% - 45%
2021	Attorney General	Miyares 55% - 45%
2024	President	Harris 50% - 47%
2024	Senate	Kaine 53% - 46%
2025	Governor	Spanberger 58% - 42%
2025	Lt. Governor	Hashmi 56% - 44%
2025	Attorney General	Jones 54% - 46%

== Composition ==
For the 118th and successive Congresses (based on redistricting following the 2020 census), the district contains all or portions of the following counties and communities:

Albemarle County (0)

District contains no incorporated or census-designated communities

Caroline County (4)

All 4 communities

Culpeper County (2)

Brandy Station, Culpeper

Greene County (3)

All 3 communities

King George County (5)

All 5 communities

Madison County (2)

Brightwood, Madison

Orange County (4)

All 4 communities

Prince William County (14)

Cherry Hill, County Center (part; also 10th), Dale City, Dumfries, Independent Hill (part; also 10th), Lake Ridge, Leesylvania, Montclair, Occoquan, Potomac Mills, Quantico, Quantico Base, Triangle, Woodbridge

Spotsylvania County (2)

Lake Wilderness, Spotsylvania Courthouse

Stafford County (7)

All 7 communities

Independent city (1)

Fredericksburg

== List of members representing the district ==
Representative	Party	Term	Cong ress	Electoral history
District established March 4, 1789
John Page (Gloucester County)	Anti-Administration	March 4, 1789 – March 3, 1793	1st 2nd	Elected in 1789. Re-elected in 1790. Redistricted to the 12th district.
Abraham B. Venable (Farmville)	Anti-Administration	March 4, 1793 – March 3, 1795	3rd 4th 5th	Redistricted from the 6th district and re-elected in 1793. Re-elected in 1795. Re-elected in 1797. Retired.
Abraham B. Venable (Farmville)	Democratic-Republican	March 4, 1795 – March 3, 1799	3rd 4th 5th	Redistricted from the 6th district and re-elected in 1793. Re-elected in 1795. Re-elected in 1797. Retired.
John Randolph (Roanoke Plantation)	Democratic-Republican	March 4, 1799 – March 3, 1803	6th 7th	Elected in 1799. Re-elected in 1801. Redistricted to the 15th district.
Joseph Lewis Jr. (Upperville)	Federalist	March 4, 1803 – March 3, 1813	8th 9th 10th 11th 12th	Elected in 1803. Re-elected in 1805. Re-elected in 1807. Re-elected in 1809. Re-elected in 1811. Redistricted to the 8th district.
Hugh Caperton (Union)	Federalist	March 4, 1813 – March 3, 1815	13th	Elected in 1813. Lost re-election.
Ballard Smith (Lewisburg)	Democratic-Republican	March 4, 1815 – March 3, 1821	14th 15th 16th	Elected in 1815. Re-elected in 1817. Re-elected in 1819. Lost re-election.
William Smith (Lewisburg)	Democratic-Republican	March 4, 1821 – March 3, 1823	17th	Elected in 1821. Redistricted to the 21st district.
Jabez Leftwich (Liberty)	Democratic-Republican	March 4, 1823 – March 3, 1825	18th	Redistricted from the 14th district and re-elected in 1823. Lost re-election.
Nathaniel Claiborne (Rocky Mount)	Jacksonian	March 4, 1825 – March 3, 1835	19th 20th 21st 22nd 23rd 24th	Elected in 1825. Re-elected in 1827. Re-elected in 1829. Re-elected in 1831. Re-elected in 1833. Re-elected in 1835. Lost re-election.
Nathaniel Claiborne (Rocky Mount)	Anti-Jacksonian	March 4, 1835 – March 3, 1837	19th 20th 21st 22nd 23rd 24th	Elected in 1825. Re-elected in 1827. Re-elected in 1829. Re-elected in 1831. Re-elected in 1833. Re-elected in 1835. Lost re-election.
Archibald Stuart (Mount Airy)	Democratic	March 4, 1837 – March 3, 1839	25th	Elected in 1837. Lost re-election.
William L. Goggin (Liberty)	Whig	March 4, 1839 – March 3, 1843	26th 27th	Elected in 1839. Re-elected in 1841. Lost re-election.
Henry A. Wise (Accomac)	Democratic	March 4, 1843 – February 12, 1844	28th	Elected in 1843. Resigned.
Vacant		February 13, 1844 – May 5, 1844	28th	
Thomas H. Bayly (Accomac)	Democratic	May 6, 1844 – March 3, 1853	28th 29th 30th 31st 32nd	Elected to finish Wise's term. Re-elected in 1845. Re-elected in 1847. Re-elected in 1849. Re-elected in 1851. Redistricted to the 1st district.
William Smith (Warrenton)	Democratic	March 4, 1853 – March 3, 1861	33rd 34th 35th 36th	Elected in 1853. Re-elected in 1855. Re-elected in 1857. Re-elected in 1859. Resigned.
Vacant		March 4, 1861 – May 22, 1861	37th	
Charles H. Upton (Falls Church)	Unionist	May 23, 1861 – February 27, 1862	37th	Election invalidated.
Vacant		February 28, 1862 – February 15, 1863	37th	
Lewis McKenzie (Alexandria)	Unionist	February 16, 1863 – March 3, 1863	37th	Elected to finish Upton's term. Lost re-election.
District inactive		March 4, 1863 – January 30, 1870	38th 39th 40th 41st	Civil War and Reconstruction
Lewis McKenzie (Alexandria)	Conservative	January 31, 1870 – March 3, 1871	41st	Elected in 1870. Lost re-election.
Elliott M. Braxton (Fredericksburg)	Democratic	March 4, 1871 – March 3, 1873	42nd	Elected in 1870. Lost re-election.
John T. Harris (Harrisonburg)	Democratic	March 4, 1873 – March 3, 1881	43rd 44th 45th 46th	Elected in 1872. Re-elected in 1874. Re-elected in 1876. Re-elected in 1878. Retired.
John Paul (Harrisonburg)	Readjuster	March 4, 1881 – September 5, 1883	47th 48th	Elected in 1880. Re-elected in 1882. Appointed U.S. District Court judge.
Vacant		September 6, 1883 – May 4, 1884	48th	
Charles T. O'Ferrall (Harrisonburg)	Democratic	May 5, 1884 – December 28, 1893	48th 49th 50th 51st 52nd 53rd	Elected to finish Paul's term. Re-elected in 1884. Re-elected in 1886. Re-elected in 1888. Re-elected in 1890. Re-elected in 1892. Retired to run for Governor of Virginia.
Vacant		December 29, 1893 – January 29, 1894	53rd	
Smith S. Turner (Front Royal)	Democratic	January 30, 1894 – March 3, 1897	53rd 54th	Elected to finish O'Ferrall's term. Re-elected in 1894. Retired.
James Hay (Madison)	Democratic	March 4, 1897 – October 1, 1916	55th 56th 57th 58th 59th 60th 61st 62nd 63rd 64th	Elected in 1896. Re-elected in 1898. Re-elected in 1900. Re-elected in 1902. Re-elected in 1904. Re-elected in 1906. Re-elected in 1908. Re-elected in 1910. Re-elected in 1912. Re-elected in 1914. Appointed U.S. Claim Court judge.
Vacant		October 2, 1916 – November 6, 1916	64th	
Thomas W. Harrison (Winchester)	Democratic	November 7, 1916 – December 15, 1922	64th 65th 66th 67th	Elected to finish Hay's term. Re-elected in 1916. Re-elected in 1918. Election invalidated.
John Paul Jr. (Harrisonburg)	Republican	December 15, 1922 – March 3, 1923	67th	Elected in 1922. Lost re-election.
Thomas W. Harrison (Winchester)	Democratic	March 4, 1923 – March 3, 1929	68th 69th 70th	Elected in 1922. Re-elected in 1924. Re-elected in 1926. Lost re-election.
Jacob A. Garber (Harrisonburg)	Republican	March 4, 1929 – March 3, 1931	71st	Elected in 1928. Lost re-election.
John W. Fishburne (Charlottesville)	Democratic	March 4, 1931 – March 3, 1933	72nd	Elected in 1930. Retired.
District inactive		March 4, 1933 – January 3, 1935	73rd	
Absalom Willis Robertson (Lexington)	Democratic	January 3, 1935 – November 5, 1946	74th 75th 76th 77th 78th 79th	Elected in 1934. Re-elected in 1936. Re-elected in 1938. Re-elected in 1940. Re-elected in 1942. Re-elected in 1944. Resigned to run for U.S. senator.
Burr Harrison (Winchester)	Democratic	November 5, 1946 – January 3, 1963	79th 80th 81st 82nd 83rd 84th 85th 86th 87th	Elected to finish Robertson's term. Re-elected in 1946. Re-elected in 1948. Re-elected in 1950. Re-elected in 1952. Re-elected in 1954. Re-elected in 1956. Re-elected in 1958. Re-elected in 1960. Retired.
John O. Marsh Jr. (Strasburg)	Democratic	January 3, 1963 – January 3, 1971	88th 89th 90th 91st	Elected in 1962. Re-elected in 1964. Re-elected in 1966. Re-elected in 1968. Retired.
J. Kenneth Robinson (Winchester)	Republican	January 3, 1971 – January 3, 1985	92nd 93rd 94th 95th 96th 97th 98th	Elected in 1970. Re-elected in 1972. Re-elected in 1974. Re-elected in 1976. Re-elected in 1978. Re-elected in 1980. Re-elected in 1982. Retired.
D. French Slaughter Jr. (Culpeper)	Republican	January 3, 1985 – November 5, 1991	99th 100th 101st 102nd	Elected in 1984. Re-elected in 1986. Re-elected in 1988. Re-elected in 1990. Resigned.
George F. Allen (Chesterfield County)	Republican	November 5, 1991 – January 3, 1993	102nd	Elected to finish Slaughter's term. Redistricted to the 5th district and retired.
Thomas J. Bliley Jr. (Richmond)	Republican	January 3, 1993 – January 3, 2001	103rd 104th 105th 106th	Redistricted from the 3rd district and re-elected in 1992. Re-elected in 1994. Re-elected in 1996. Re-elected in 1998. Retired.
Eric Cantor (Richmond)	Republican	January 3, 2001 – August 18, 2014	107th 108th 109th 110th 111th 112th 113th	Elected in 2000. Re-elected in 2002. Re-elected in 2004. Re-elected in 2006. Re-elected in 2008. Re-elected in 2010. Re-elected in 2012. Lost renomination and then resigned.
Vacant		August 18, 2014 – November 12, 2014	113th	
Dave Brat (Glen Allen)	Republican	November 12, 2014 – January 3, 2019	113th 114th 115th	Elected to finish Cantor's term. Elected to full term in 2014. Re-elected in 2016. Lost re-election.
Abigail Spanberger (Glen Allen)	Democratic	January 3, 2019 – January 3, 2025	116th 117th 118th	Elected in 2018. Re-elected in 2020. Re-elected in 2022. Retired to run for governor of Virginia.
Eugene Vindman (Dale City)	Democratic	January 3, 2025 – present	119th	Elected in 2024. Re-elected in 2026.

== Historical district boundaries ==
The Virginia Seventh District started in 1788 covering the counties of Essex, Richmond, Westmoreland, Northumberland, Lancaster, Gloucester, Middlesex, King and Queen, King William and Caroline.

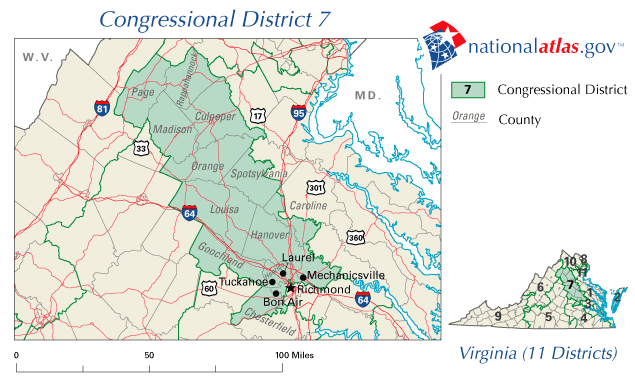
2003–2013

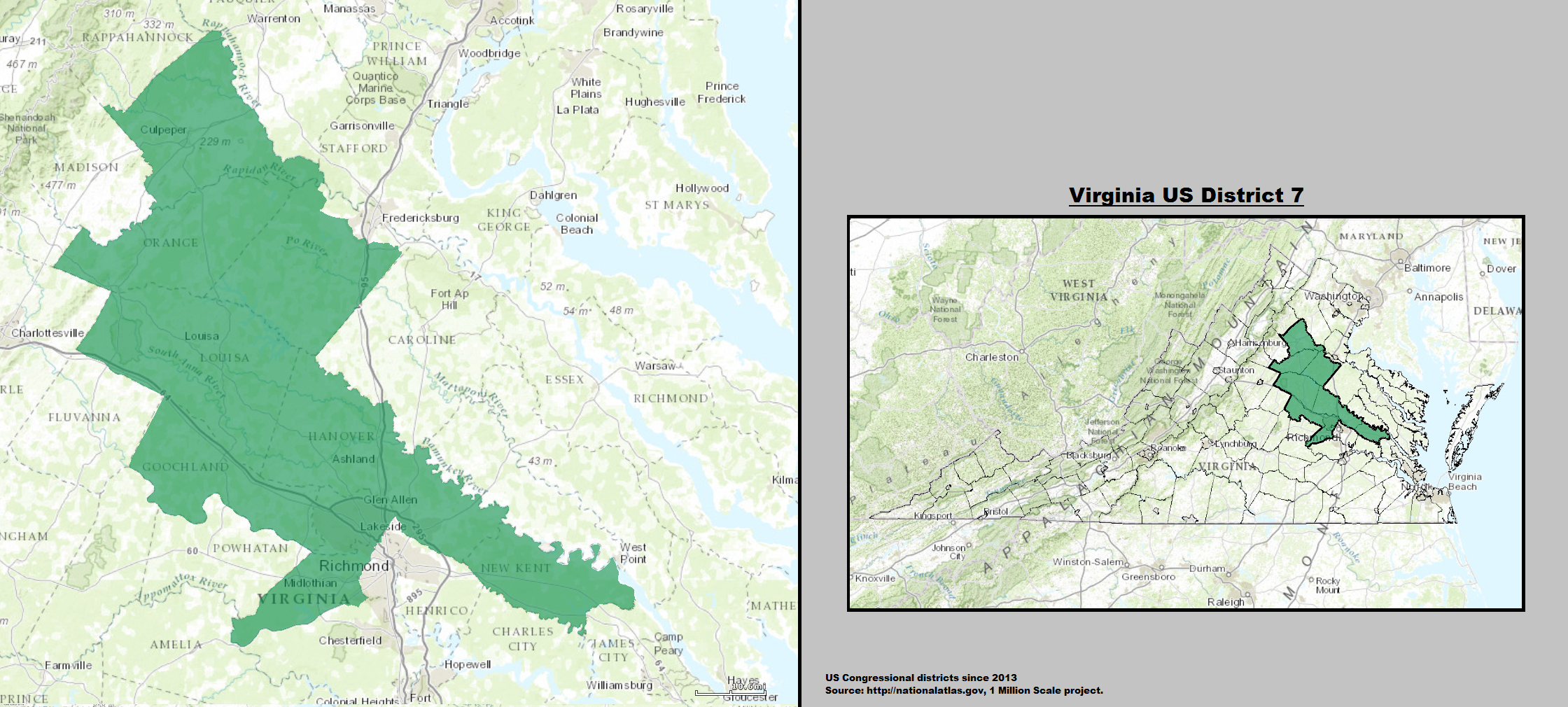
2013–2017

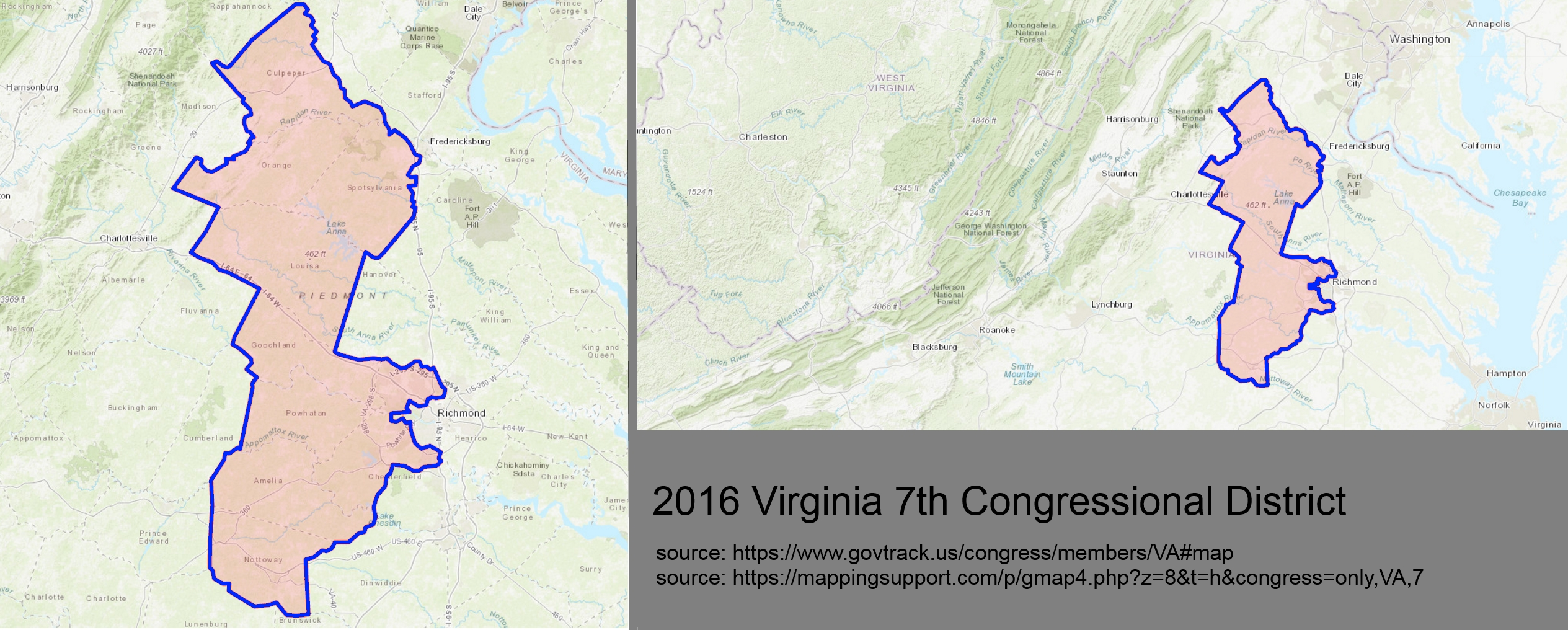
2017–2023

== See also ==
- Virginia's congressional districts
- List of United States congressional districts
