= Lewis McKenzie =

American politician (1810–1895)

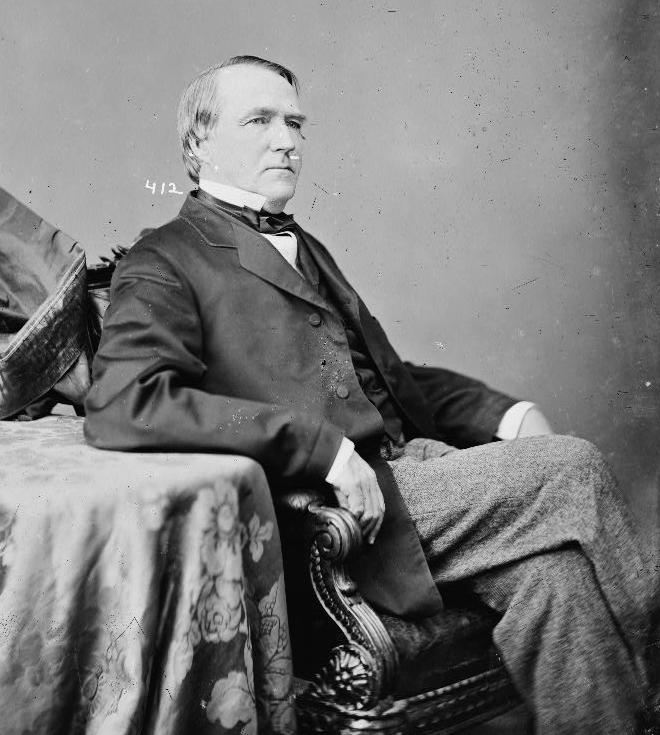

Member of the U.S. House of Representatives from Virginia's 7th district
- In office January 31, 1870 – March 3, 1871
- Preceded by: Himself ^{(1)}
- Succeeded by: Elliott M. Braxton
- In office February 16, 1863 – March 3, 1863
- Preceded by: Charles H. Upton
- Succeeded by: Himself ^{(1)}

Mayor of Alexandria, Virginia
- In office 1861–1863
- Preceded by: William B. Price
- Succeeded by: Charles A. Ware

Personal details
- Born: October 7, 1810 Alexandria, District of Columbia, U.S.
- Died: June 28, 1895 (aged 84) Alexandria, Virginia, U.S.
- Resting place: Presbyterian Cemetery; Alexandria, Virginia, U.S.
- Party: Union
- Other political affiliations: Conservative
- Profession: Politician, Merchant, Railroad President

Lewis McKenzie (October 7, 1810 – June 28, 1895) was a nineteenth-century politician, merchant and railroad president from Virginia.

== Biography ==
Born in Alexandria, District of Columbia, McKenzie pursued an academic course as a young adult and prominently engaged in shipping and mercantile pursuits, founding and becoming president of the Alexandria, Loudoun and Hampshire Railroad. He was also president of the First National Bank.

He was civically minded and began his political career as a Whig and was a member of the Alexandria County common council from 1843 to 1850 during which time he instigated the final push for retrocession in 1846. He was a member of the city council of Alexandria from 1855 to 1859; and was acting mayor of the city from 1861 to 1863. At various times he was the presiding justice of the magistrate court and a Brigadier General of the town's militia.

McKenzie was elected a Unionist to the United States House of Representatives to fill a vacancy in 1863, serving from February to March of that year and afterward returned to the Alexandria city council, serving again until 1866 and returning a third time in 1868, serving again until 1870. He returned to the House as a Conservative in 1869, serving from 1870 to 1871. In 1870 he ran as the Republican candidate and lost. In 1874 he ran for the state senate and lost. He was appointed postmaster of Alexandria in 1878. McKenzie returned to the city council for the last time in 1887, serving until 1891. He died in Alexandria on June 28, 1895, and was interred there in Presbyterian Cemetery.

== Election of 1869 ==
McKenzie was elected to the U.S. House of Representatives unopposed.

U.S. House of Representatives
| Preceded by Charles H. Upton | Member of the U.S. House of Representatives from Virginia's 7th congressional district 1863 | Succeeded by Himself ^{(1)} |
| Preceded by Himself ^{(1)} | Member of the U.S. House of Representatives from Virginia's 7th congressional district 1870–1871 | Succeeded by Elliott M. Braxton |
Notes and references
1. Because of Virginia's secession, the state's 7th congressional district seat was vacant for almost seven years, and McKenzie ended up succeeding himself.
