= Charles H. Upton =

American politician

Charles Upton

Member of the U.S. House of Representatives from Virginia's 7th district
- In office May 23, 1861 – February 27, 1862
- Preceded by: William Smith
- Succeeded by: Lewis McKenzie

Personal details
- Born: August 23, 1812 Salem, Massachusetts, U.S.
- Died: June 17, 1877 (aged 64) Geneva, Switzerland
- Resting place: Congressional Cemetery; Washington, D.C., U.S.
- Party: Union
- Profession: Politician, Lawyer

Charles Horace Upton (August 23, 1812 – June 17, 1877) was a nineteenth-century politician from Massachusetts and Virginia.

== Biography ==
Born in Salem, Massachusetts, Upton attended the public schools as a child and went on to graduate from Bowdoin College in Brunswick, Maine. He moved to Falls Church, Virginia, in 1836 and engaged in agricultural and literary pursuits. He held several local offices before being elected a Unionist to the United States House of Representatives in 1861, serving until 1862 when the House declared he was not entitled to the seat.

In 1863, President Abraham Lincoln appointed Upton consul to Switzerland, which he served as until his death on June 17, 1877, in Geneva, Switzerland. He was interred in Congressional Cemetery in Washington, D.C..

U.S. House of Representatives
Preceded by William Smith	Member of the U.S. House of Representatives from Virginia's 7th congressional district 1861–1862	Succeeded by Lewis McKenzie
