= SS Carter Braxton =

Liberty ship of WWII

History

United States
- Name: Carter Braxton
- Namesake: Carter Braxton
- Owner: War Shipping Administration (WSA)
- Operator: Union Sulphur & Oil Co., Inc.
- Ordered: as type (EC2-S-C1) hull, MCE hull 22
- Awarded: 14 March 1941
- Builder: Bethlehem-Fairfield Shipyard, Baltimore, Maryland
- Cost: $1,151,856
- Yard number: 2009
- Way number: 9
- Laid down: 3 September 1941
- Launched: 24 January 1942
- Completed: 18 March 1942
- Identification: Call sign: KBTH
- Fate: Sold for commercial use, 19 June 1947

United States
- Name: Herman Frasch
- Namesake: Herman Frasch
- Owner: Union Sulphur Co.
- Fate: Sold, April 1955

United States
- Name: Cilco Ranger
- Owner: Terminal Steamship Co.
- Operator: A.L. Burbank & Co.
- Fate: Sold, August 1956

United States
- Name: Murray Hill
- Owner: Fairfield Steamship Corp.
- Fate: Sold, March 1957

Liberia
- Name: Sea Spray
- Owner: Universal Tramp Shipping Co.
- Operator: Seatraders, Inc.
- Fate: Sold, March 1960

Greece
- Name: Meltemi
- Operator: Seatraders, Inc.
- Fate: Scrapped, 1968

General characteristics
- Class & type: Liberty ship; type EC2-S-C1, standard
- Tonnage: 10,865 LT DWT; 7,176 GRT
- Displacement: 3,380 long tons (3,434 t) (light); 14,245 long tons (14,474 t) (max)
- Length: 441 feet 6 inches (135 m) oa; 416 feet (127 m) pp; 427 feet (130 m) lwl
- Beam: 57 feet (17 m)
- Draft: 27 ft 9.25 in (8.4646 m)
- Installed power: 2 × Oil fired 450 °F (232 °C) boilers, operating at 220 psi (1,500 kPa); 2,500 hp (1,900 kW)
- Propulsion: 1 × triple-expansion steam engine, (manufactured by Clark Bros. Co., Cleveland, Ohio); 1 × screw propeller
- Speed: 11.5 knots (21.3 km/h; 13.2 mph)
- Capacity: 562,608 cubic feet (15,931 m^{3}) (grain); 499,573 cubic feet (14,146 m^{3}) (bale)
- Complement: 38–62 USMM; 21–40 USNAG
- Armament: Varied by ship; Bow-mounted 3-inch (76 mm)/50-caliber gun; Stern-mounted 4-inch (102 mm)/50-caliber gun; 2–8 × single 20-millimeter (0.79 in) Oerlikon anti-aircraft (AA) cannons and/or, 2–8 × 37-millimeter (1.46 in) M1 AA guns

SS Carter Braxton was a Liberty ship built in the United States during World War II. She was named after Carter Braxton, a Founding Father and signer of the United States Declaration of Independence, as well as a merchant, planter, and Virginia politician. A grandson of Robert "King" Carter, one of the wealthiest and most powerful landowners and slaveholders in the Old Dominion, Carter Braxton was active in Virginia's legislature for more than 25 years.

== Construction ==
Carter Braxton was laid down on 3 September 1941, under a Maritime Commission (MARCOM) contract, MCE hull 22, by the Bethlehem-Fairfield Shipyard, Baltimore, Maryland; and was launched on 24 January 1942.

== History ==
She was allocated to the Union Sulphur & Oil Co., Inc., on 18 March 1942. She was sold for commercial use on 19 June 1947, to the Union Sulphur & Oil Co., Inc., and renamed Herman Frasch, after Herman Frasch.

== Bibliography ==
- "Bethlehem-Fairfield, Baltimore MD". www.ShipbuildingHistory.com. 14 August 2008.
- Maritime Administration. "Carter Braxton". Ship History Database Vessel Status Card. U.S. Department of Transportation, Maritime Administration.
- Davies, James (May 2004). "Specifications (As-Built)" (PDF). p. 23.
- "SS Carter Braxton".
