= Chericoke =

Historic house in Virginia, United States

- U.S. National Register of Historic Places
- U.S. Historic district
- Virginia Landmarks Register
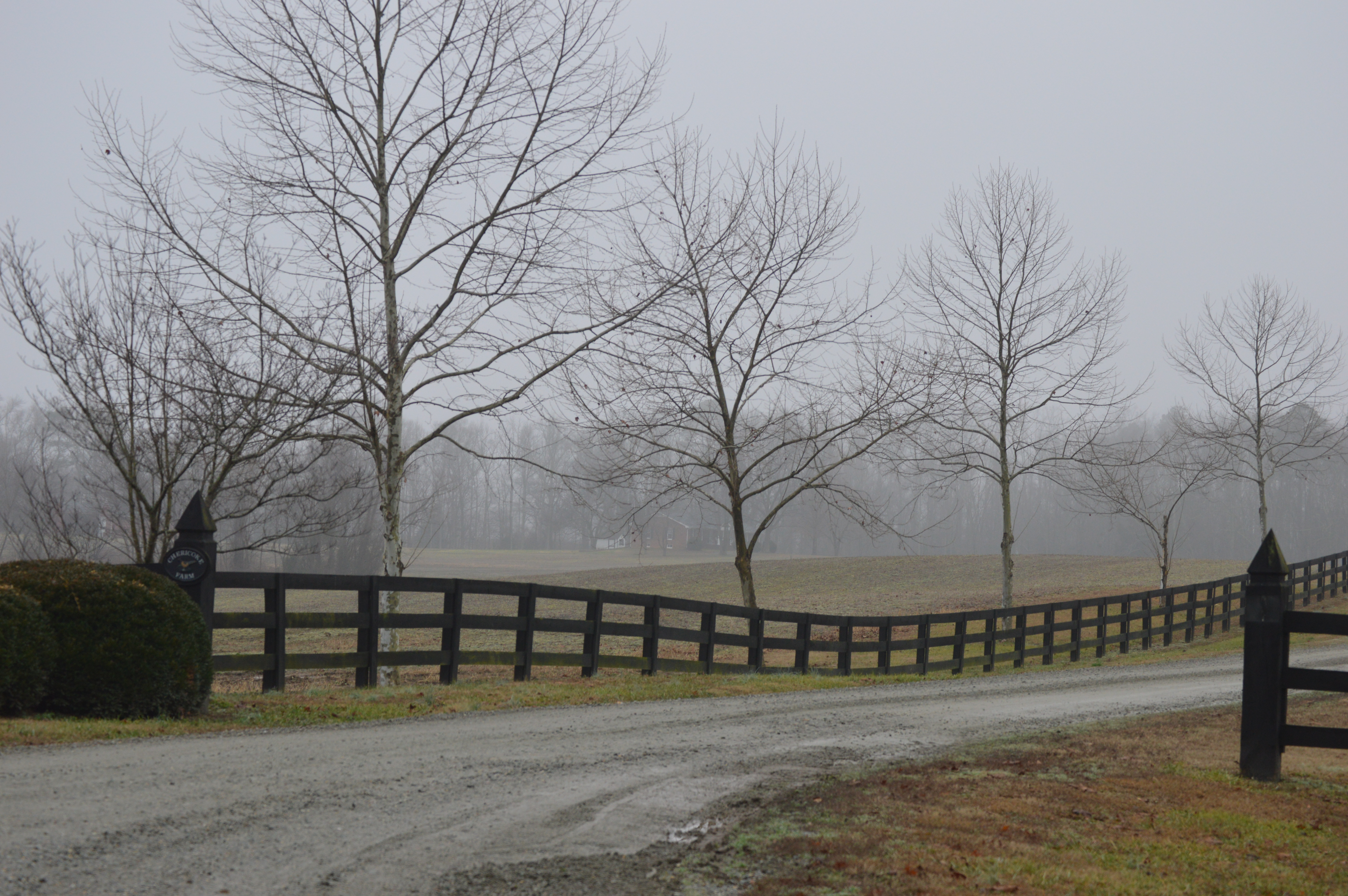
- Entrance to the property

- Location within Virginia Location within the United States
- Location: W of Falls on VA 666, Falls, Virginia
- Coordinates: 37°38′07″N 77°06′47″W
- Area: 37 acres (15 ha)
- Built: 1828; 198 years ago
- Architectural style: Georgian, Federal
- NRHP reference No.: 80004195
- VLR No.: 050-0013

Significant dates
- Added to NRHP: September 8, 1980
- Designated VLR: April 18, 1978

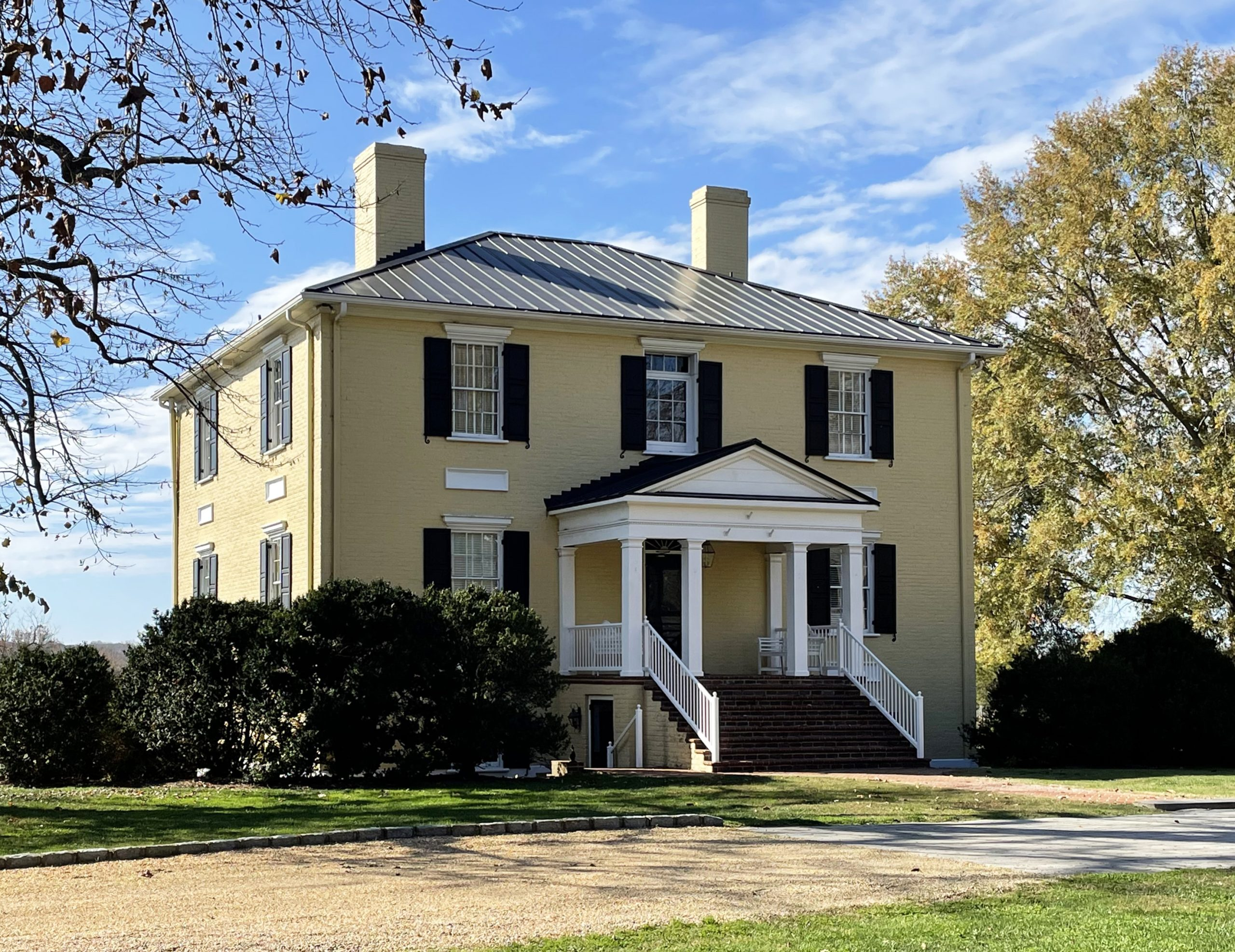
The house

Chericoke is a historic home and national historic district located near Falls in King William County, Virginia. It was built by Carter Braxton (a Founding Father of the United States and signer of the Declaration of Independence) in 1767. Located several miles northwest of his family's estate of Elsing Green, Chericoke served as Braxton's home from 1767 to 1786. Braxton is believed to have been buried in the adjoining family cemetery shortly after his death in 1797. The structure was rebuilt in brick in the Federal style by his grandson Dr. Corbin Braxton in 1828.

It was listed on the National Register of Historic Places in 1980.

Now, the property is in the possession of and maintained by Alice Horsely Siegel, who has since significantly renovated with the addition of several other small houses, though the structure of the original house, known as the "Big House," has largely remained unchanged.
