= Braxton (given name) =

Origin
- Origin: English

Other names
- Related names: Braxtyn

Braxton is a given name of English origin meaning "badger", as well as "Brock's town".

People with the given name include:

- Braxton Ashcraft (born 1999), American baseball player
- Braxton Beacham (1864–1924), American politician
- Braxton Berrios (born 1995), American football player
- Braxton Bragg (1817–1876), American officer and Civil War Confederate general
- Braxton Bragg (baseball) (born 2000), American baseball player
- Braxton Burmeister (born 1998), American football player
- Braxton Cook (born 1991), American musician
- Braxton Craven (1822–1882), American educator
- Braxton Davidson (born 1996), American baseball player
- Braxton Garrett (born 1997), American baseball player
- Braxton Harris (born 1983/1984), American football coach
- Braxton Hoyett (born 1996), American football player
- Braxton Jones (born 1999), American football player
- Braxton Kelley (born 1986), American football player
- Braxton Key (born 1997), American basketball player
- Braxton Lee (born 1993), American baseball player
- Braxton Miller (born 1992), American football player
- Braxton Mitchell (born 2000), American politician
- Braxton Pope, American filmmaker
- Braxton Powell (1944–2010), American politician
- Braxton Sorensen-McGee (born 2006), New Zealand rugby union player
- Braxton Stone-Papadopoulos (born 1995), Canadian wrestler
- Braxton Taghvai-Najib (born 2002), American soccer player
