= Derrick Drop Braxton =

American record producer and composer

- Born: Derrick Braxton; November 25, 1981 (age 44); New Brunswick, New Jersey, United States
- Genres: Hip hop
- Occupations: Record producer, composer
- Years active: (2001–present)
- Label: 1st & 15th Entertainment

Derrick Braxton (born November 25, 1981, New Brunswick, New Jersey) is an American record producer and composer, best known for working with artists such as Lupe Fiasco, Cassidy, Amerie, Rich Harrison and Raekwon.

Braxton is currently signed with 1st and 15th Entertainment/Atlantic Records.

== Early life ==
Braxton attended Hampton University in Hampton, VA and during his matriculation, he started meeting other students that had a love for music which piqued his interest. At the age of 19, he met super producer Swizz Beatz at NYC's WQHT Hot 97's own Funkmaster Flex's annual car show in 2001. Braxton then signed under Swizz Beatz Fullsurface/J Records imprint for approximately 2 years. After that time, Braxton forged relationships and worked with Shae Haley, Chad Hugo, and Pharrell Williams of N.E.R.D. from 2003-2004. N.E.R.D. ended up signed Braxton under the Blackhole/StarTrak (also known as The Neptunes) imprint for 2 years.

== 1st & 15th Entertainment ==
Braxton then met rapper Lupe Fiasco in 2005 and started working on such albums as "The Cool" and "Food and Liquor." Shortly after, Braxton signed a deal to 1st & 15th Entertainment/Atlantic Records in 2012.

== Production discography ==
Title	Artist	Format	Album
Jurassic Harlem	Poster Boy	Mixtape	
"So Long"	Cassidy	Single	I'm a Hustla
Hold That	Cassidy	Mixtape	
"Forcast"	Amerie	Single	Because I Love It
"That's What U R"	Amerie	Single	Because I Love It
"Streets Alone"	Amerie	Single	Because I Love It
"Intro/Outro"	Lupe Fiasco	Single	Lupe Fiasco's Food & Liquor
"Pressure"	Lupe Fiasco	Single	Lupe Fiasco's Food & Liquor
"The Coolest"	Lupe Fiasco	Single	Lupe Fiasco's The Cool
"Street's On Fire"	Lupe Fiasco	Single	Lupe Fiasco's The Cool
"Gold Watch"	Lupe Fiasco	Single	Lupe Fiasco's The Cool
"Can You Let Me Know"	DJ Deckstream	Single	Deckstream Soundtracks
"We On"	Gemini	Single	Troubles of the World
"Find Me"	The Fuzz Band	Single	Change (EP)
"Crazy Strings"		Soundtrack track	Step Up
Hug		Complete soundtrack	Hug (short film)
"This is My Year"	Se7en	Single	
"Rat Race"	Jessica Tonder	Single	-
"Detox"	Jessica Tonder	Single	-
"The Robot and the Little Girl"	Jessica Tonder	Single	-
"Everyday"	Jessica Tonder	Single	-
"After the Circus"	Jessica Tonder	Single	-
"No Welcome"	Jessica Tonder	Single	-
"The Bee"	Jessica Tonder	Single	-
"The Bee Remix"	Jessica Tonder	Single	-
"Art of War"	Jessica Tonder	Single	-
"Smoking Gun"	Jessica Tonder	Single	-
Worldwide Renewal Program	Various (compilation)	Album presented by Adult Swim	
"Escape Earth"	Diverse	Single	
