= P. H. A. Braxton =

American politician (1852–1900)

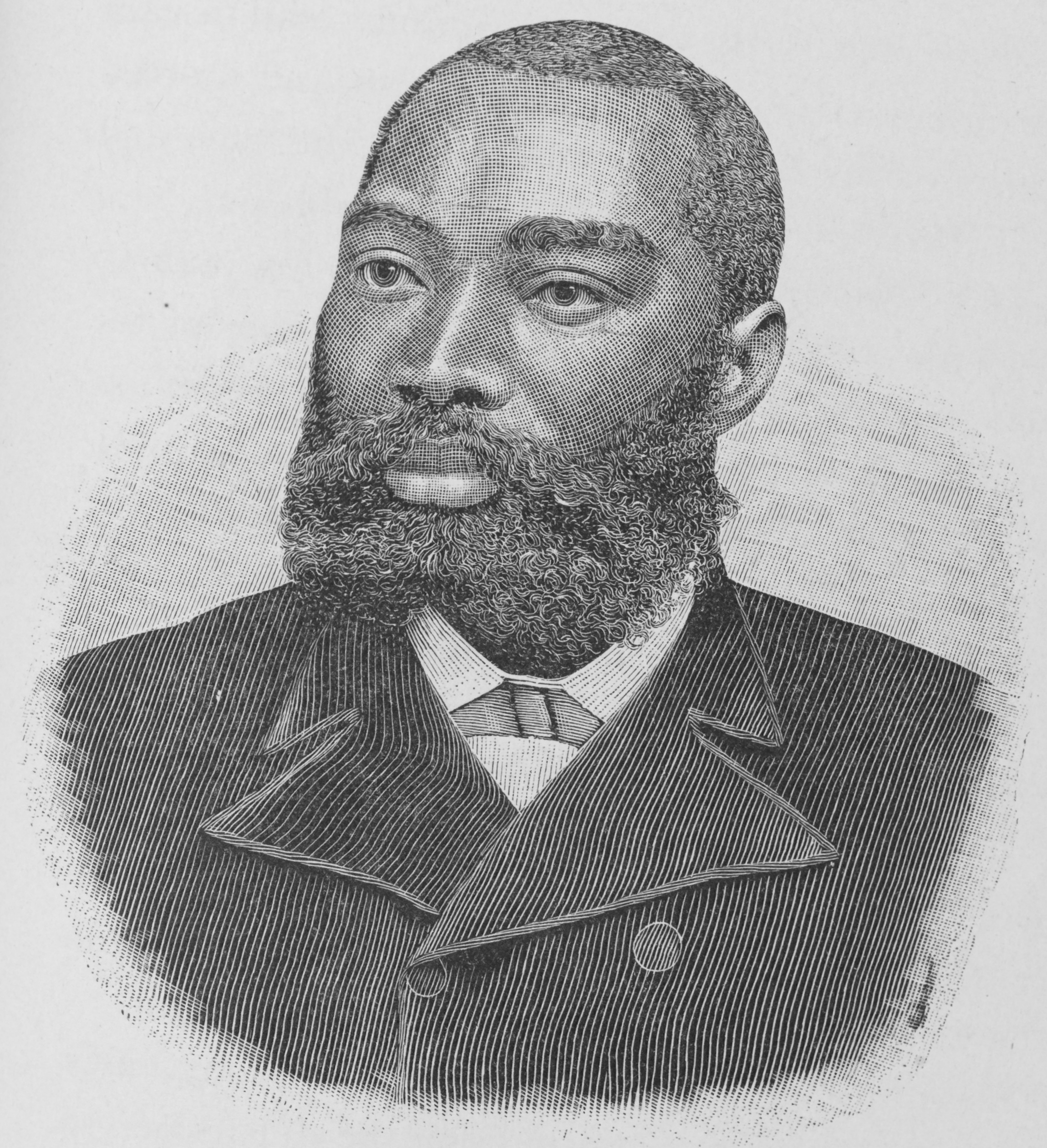
- Braxton in 1887
- Born: Patrick Henry Alexander Braxton; September 22, 1852; King William County, Virginia
- Died: March 7, 1900 (aged 47); Baltimore, Maryland
- Occupations: Minister, civil servant
- Political party: Republican

Religious life
- Religion: Baptist

Patrick Henry Alexander Braxton (September 22, 1852 – March 7, 1900) was a preacher and politician in Virginia and Maryland. During the Reconstruction Era, Braxton was a county constable in King William County, Virginia and later a United States Custom House collector in Low Cedar Point, Westmoreland County, Virginia. In 1879 he became pastor of Calvary Baptist Church in Baltimore, Maryland, a position he held for about twenty years. He was active in fighting for civil rights and educational issues.

== Early life ==
Patrick Henry Alexander Braxton was born a slave in King William County, Virginia on September 22, 1852. His parents, Benjamin and Patsy Braxton, were both slaves and both had been previously married. Braxton was the only child of their last marriage to survive until adulthood. Braxton his mother, and all of his half-siblings moved to Staunton, Virginia to follow the oldest daughter of their owner upon the daughter's marriage. In 1863, his new master was killed, and the family returned to King William County, Virginia, where they were hired out until they were freed in 1865, the year the American Civil War ended. At that point, Braxton was the only son of his parents who had not been sold away or died. Braxton remained in King William County, working on farms and doing manual labor. In 1868 a school was started at the Cat-tail Baptist church in the county, and Braxton began to attend full-time during the month of August 1868, and at nights thereafter. He also joined a debating club on Friday evenings. In August 1872, he graduated valedictorian in his class.

== Politics and early career ==
Braxton became active in politics, and in May 1872, he was elected county constable. Later that year a warrant was written for a local doctor named William Virus, who had been accused of murder but was never tried. When Braxton and two other men went to Virus' farm, Virus refused to cooperate and threatened to kill Braxton. Braxton and his companions subdued Virus, but when Virus was received by the court, he accused Braxton of assault and battery. The court would not take Braxton's accusation that Virus resisted arrest and threatened to kill an officer of the law in the discharge of duty. As Braxton was black and Virus white, Braxton concluded that this was because of prejudice and resigned from his position.

In the meantime, Braxton began to study law and in October and November 1874 he was a member of a United States paneled jury, and in 1874 he moved to Washington, DC. In June 1875 he received an appointment as a collector at the United States Custom House at Low Cedar Point, Virginia.

== Religious career ==
In October 1875 he was baptized by Rev. Silas Miles and on July 9, 1876 he was commissioned to preach the gospel. In December 1878 he was appointed general collecting agent of the consolidated American Baptist Missionary Convention, and moved to Richmond, Virginia. In April, 1879 he moved to Cavalry Baptist church in Baltimore Maryland. He was ordained on June 6 and officially became the church's pastor on June 8, 1879. He was very successful at Calvary, building from a congregation of ten who met in borrowed space to a large congregation with a newly built church located at Park, Howard, and Biddle.

Braxton was a member of the Virginia State Baptist Convention, the New England Baptist Missionary Convention, and the Brotherhood of Liberty. He was an outspoken advocate for civil rights, for the education of African American children, and for the hiring of black teachers. In February 1892, the Baptist Ministers' Conference, a group dominated by white clergymen, expelled Braxton from their conference, a move which was strongly criticized by Braxton's congregation. That year, Braxton met with president Benjamin Harrison to discuss the violence against blacks in the south. When the president stated he could not act, Braxton spoke out at the State Convention of Colored Baptists protesting against the lack of constitutional power to defend the rights of blacks. Braxton retired in 1899.

== Family and death ==
On October 18, 1881 he married Katie Bannister of Baltimore. Braxton died on March 7, 1900. His funeral was at Temple Baptist Church, which was formerly known as Calvary, where he was pastor.
