= USS Braxton =

1944 Haskell-class attack transport

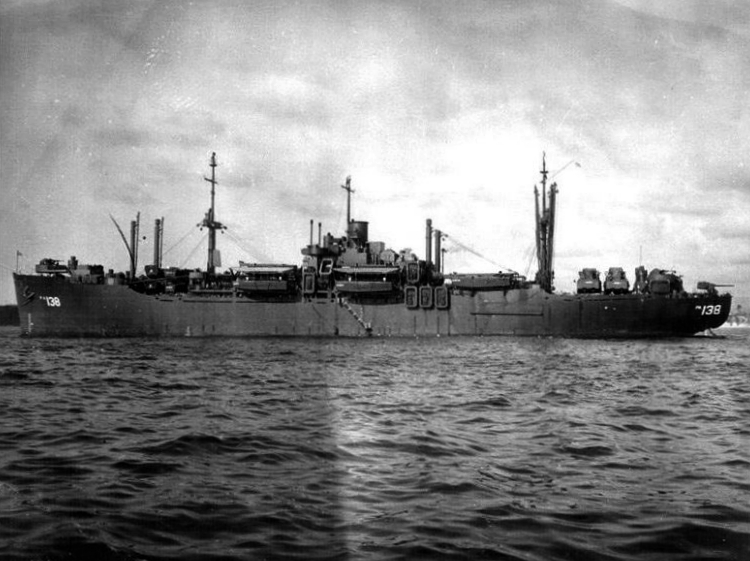

History

United States
- Name: USS Braxton
- Namesake: Braxton County, West Virginia
- Builder: California Shipbuilding Corporation
- Laid down: 29 August 1944
- Launched: 3 November 1944
- Acquired: 28 December 1944
- Commissioned: 29 December 1944
- Decommissioned: 27 June 1946
- Stricken: 19 July 1946
- Fate: Sold for scrap, 9 April 1973

General characteristics
- Class & type: Haskell-class attack transport
- Displacement: 6,873 tons (lt), 14,837 t (fl)
- Length: 455 ft (139 m)
- Beam: 62 ft (19 m)
- Draft: 24 ft (7 m)
- Propulsion: 1 × geared turbine, 2 × header-type boilers, 1 × propeller, designed 8,500 shp (6,338 kW)
- Speed: 17 knots (31 km/h; 20 mph)
- Boats & landing craft carried: 2 × LCM; 12 × LCVP; 3 × LCPL
- Capacity: Troops: 86 officers, 1,475 enlisted; Cargo: 150,000 cu ft, 2,900 tons
- Complement: 56 officers, 480 enlisted
- Armament: 1 × 5"/38 dual-purpose gun; 4 × twin 40mm guns; 10 × single 20mm guns; late armament, add 1 × 40mm quad mount

USS Braxton (APA-138) was a Haskell-class attack transport in service with the United States Navy from 1944 to 1946. She was scrapped in 1973.

== History ==
Braxton (APA-138) was laid down on 29 August 1944 at Wilmington, Los Angeles, by the California Shipbuilding Corp. under a Maritime Commission contract (MCV hull 54); launched on 3 November 1944; sponsored by Mrs. J. R. DeFrees; acquired by the Navy from the Maritime Commission on a loan-charter basis on 28 December 1944; and commissioned the following day at Terminal Island, San Pedro, Los Angeles.

=== Pacific War ===
Following alterations and repairs between 3 and 5 January 1945, the attack transport sailed on 9 January for shakedown training in the Long Beach, California, area. Less than a week later on 14 January, Braxton collided with the merchant tanker SS Mission Capistrano during a heavy fog and suffered damage to two LCVP's, three life rafts, and her hull. Following repairs, the attack transport departed Long Beach on 22 January, proceeded to San Diego, California, and reported the next day for duty with the Amphibious Training Command, U.S. Pacific Fleet.

Braxton then conducted amphibious exercises off the coast of southern California until mid-February and then headed for San Francisco, California, where she arrived on the 20th. After embarking passengers, she departed from the Bay area on the 24th, bound for Hawaii. The ship moored at Pearl Harbor on 1 March and disembarked her passengers. For the rest of the month, she operated in Hawaiian waters conducting amphibious exercises off Maui and Oahu.

On the morning of 9 April, the attack transport sailed for the Marshalls in convoy PD-372T—with also USS Bottineau (APA-235), Sea Flasher, and the minesweepers USS Fixity (AM-235) and USS Inaugural (AM-242)—and anchored at Eniwetok on the morning of 18 April. The following day, after picking up additional escorts in the form of USS Change (AM-159) and PCE-898, the convoy sailed thence for the Marianas.

Braxton reached Saipan early on 23 April and disembarked some of her passengers before pushing on to Guam which she reached on the afternoon of the 26th. There, she disembarked her remaining out-bound passengers before embarking U.S. Marine Corps officers and enlisted men for the return voyage on 1 May. That afternoon, the transport sailed for Oahu. Braxton arrived at Pearl Harbor on the morning of 10 May, but sailed the following morning for the U.S. West Coast. Although initially ordered to San Diego, she was redirected to San Francisco en route and disembarked 120 Marines and 217 casualties there on 17 May. After brief voyage repairs, the ship then shifted to the Naval Supply Depot at Oakland, California, where she loaded a cargo of fuel, ammunition, and supplies, before sailing for Hawaii on 30 May.

Arriving at Pearl Harbor on 5 June, the attack transport disembarked passengers from the U.S. West Coast and embarked 5 army officers and 296 enlisted men for the voyage westward, returning to sea on the 8th bound for the Marshalls. Following a stop at Eniwetok on 15 and 16 June, she pushed on to Saipan, remained there from the 19th through the 26th, and finally headed on to Ulithi. Underway from that atoll on 20 July in convoy UOK 39, consisting of 40 ships—both merchant and naval—the vessel arrived at Okinawa soon thereafter and discharged her cargo near Kinmu Wan on 25 July.

While Braxton remained at Okinawa for the remainder of the month, wartime conditions were very much in evidence. As her war diary for 27 July states: "enemy planes definitely in [the] vicinity...." The presence of the Japanese planes usually triggered the use of smoke boats and shipboard generators to screen the ship in artificial fog. Such conditions continued into August, but the arrival of a typhoon forced the ship to sea on the 1st for two days to ride out the "blow."

Early on the 6th, the ship weighed anchor and sailed for Ulithi, joining convoy 0KU-17—34 ships and 11 escorts. Upon her arrival there on the 10th, she fueled from USS Sepulga (AO-20) and received orders to sail for Saipan. Underway on 13 August, she had not gone far before she received orders re-routing her to Guam. Braxton moored in Apra Harbor on 14 August and commenced loading cargo and embarking passengers. All through the night and most of the morning, the embarking and loading continued until shortly before noon. Underway on the 15th, Braxton stood out of Apra Harbor, bound for Japan. She then formed up with USS Grimes (APA-172), USS Meriwether (APA-203), USS Mellette (APA-156), USS Lanier (APA-125), USS Waukesha (AKA-84), and a trio of destroyers to make up Task Unit (TU) 12.1.2.

Braxton and her consorts later joined task force TF 31—commanded by Rear Admiral Oscar C. Badger in USS Iowa (BB-61)—on the 19th and she dropped anchor in Sagami Wan, Honshū on the 27th. After landing the first occupation troops on the 30th, the ship returned to the transport area in Tokyo Bay. During the rest of the day, more Marines, together with bluejacket detachments and Royal Marine units—under the guns of the United States Third Fleet and beneath a veritable umbrella of aircraft—occupied Yokosuka.

On 1 September, Braxton sailed for the Marianas, and anchored in Saipan harbor on the 5th. The next morning, she fueled from USS Caribou (IX-114). She then shifted to Tanapag Harbor where, between 9 and 11 September, she embarked more than 1,200 passengers. She cleared Tanapag Harbor on the afternoon of 18 September, bound for Nagasaki. Early in the afternoon of 23 September, Braxton and the other transports disembarked the 2nd Marines and 6th Marines to occupy the atomic bomb-devastated city. Three days later, Braxton—with nine other APAs, an attack cargo ship, and a single escort—sailed for the Philippines. After refueling and reprovisioning at Manila from 9 to 11 October, she embarked elements of the U.S. Army's 25th Infantry Division at Lingayen Gulf between 12 and 14 October. She got underway on 23 October in Lingayen Nagoya Convoy No. 2.

=== Operation Magic Carpet ===
Braxton reached Nagoya on the 28th, but did not moor until the 30th. There, she disembarked the 25th Division, rear echelon and completed unloading her cargo later that day. Having put her "third load of occupation troops on Japan", Braxton sailed for San Pedro, Los Angeles, on 3 November as part of the "Operation Magic Carpet" fleet. She then made a round-trip, "Magic-Carpet" voyage to the Philippines and returned to San Pedro on 13 February 1946.

Braxton remained there into April. On the 9th, LCI-1O17 came alongside and transferred 8 German officers, 154 enlisted men, and 2 prisoners—the remaining crewmen of the heavy cruiser Prinz Eugen (IX-300), a war prize that had been brought to the United States from the Baltic—to Braxton. The transport got underway at 1610 that same day. After transiting the Panama Canal on the 17th, Braxton reached Staten Island early on the 23d. She then embarked 1,492 U.S. Army enlisted men and, with the 164 former Prinz Eugen crewmen still on board, sailed for Germany on 3 May 1946, reaching Bremerhaven on the morning of the 10th.

=== Decommissioning and fate ===
Ten days later, Braxton got underway for the United States with naval and military passengers and reached Staten Island on 30 May. Underway for Norfolk on 3 June, Braxton anchored in Hampton Roads the following morning. After preparations for inactivation, she was decommissioned there on 27 June 1946. Braxton was turned over to the War Shipping Administration on the 29th, and her name was struck from the Navy List on 19 July 1946. She was placed in the portion of the National Defense Reserve Fleet berthed at James River, Virginia. She remained there, inactive, until sold on 9 April 1973 to the Union Minerals and Alloys Corporation, of New York City, to be scrapped.
