= Loretta Braxton =

American mathematician (1934–2019)

- Born: January 19, 1934; Winston-Salem, North Carolina
- Died: February 19, 2019 (aged 85)
- Citizenship: American

Academic background
- Education: Virginia Union University (BS), University of Illinois Urbana-Champaign (MA), University of Virginia (DEd)

Academic work
- Discipline: Mathematician
- Institutions: Virginia State University

Loretta Marion Murray Braxton (January 19, 1934 – February 19, 2019) was an American mathematician who headed the mathematics department at Virginia State University for fifteen years.

== Early life and education ==
Braxton was originally from Winston-Salem, North Carolina. After graduating as valedictorian from Atkins High School in Winston-Salem, she studied mathematics at Virginia Union University, a historically black university in Richmond, Virginia, and graduated magna cum laude in 1955. With this degree, she returned to Atkins High School as a mathematics teacher, and also taught at the junior high school level in Norfolk, Virginia.

== Graduate study and academic career ==
In 1962, she earned a master's degree in mathematics from the University of Illinois Urbana-Champaign, and took a position as instructor of mathematics at Virginia State College, which later became Virginia State University.

While continuing at Virginia State, she earned a doctorate of education, specializing in mathematics education, at the University of Virginia in 1973. Her dissertation was The Effects of Instruction in Sentential Logic on the Growth of the Logical Thinking Abilities of Junior High School Students.

She was promoted through the academic ladder at Virginia State, reading full professor, and became chair of the mathematics department from 1977 until 1992, when she retired as Distinguished Professor Emerita.

== Personal life ==
Braxton was married to a Baptist minister, Rev. Dr. Harold E. Braxton, who became director of religious studies and dean of humanities and social sciences at Virginia State. She died in February 2019.
