= George Braxton Jr. =

Member of the House of Burgesses from King and Queen County, Colony of Virginia
- In office 1758-1762 Serving with John Robinson
- Preceded by: Philip Johnson
- Succeeded by: John Pendleton

Personal details
- Born: 1734 Newington plantation, King and Queen County, Colony of Virginia
- Died: 1761 (aged 26–27) Newington plantation, King and Queen County, Colony of Virginia
- Resting place: Mattaponi Church
- Spouse: Mary Blair
- Relations: George Braxton Sr. (grandfather); Carter Braxton (brother)
- Occupation: merchant, Planter, politician

George Braxton Jr. (1734–1761) was a merchant, planter, and politician in King and Queen County, which he represented in the House of Burgesses for at least two terms. However, he is often confused with his grandfather and possibly also with his father of the same name (both of whom also served as burgesses and died within a year of each other), and overshadowed by his younger brother, Carter Braxton, who became a Founding Father of the United States.

== Early and family life ==
This man was born to Mary Carter (1712–1736), one of the five daughters of "King" Carter, probably the wealthiest man in the Virginia colony. Thus, his maternal grandfather was a land agent for Lord Fairfax, and now considered as founder of one of the First Families of Virginia. Many of his cousins would also serve in the House of Burgesses, and hold high offices in the colony, as well as like his brother Carter Braxton become patriots for independence. Mary Carter brought a 2,000 pound sterling dowry when she married George Braxton (1705–1749) in late 1732 (or early 1733, the marriage banns having been postponed because of her father's death), although because of a hard money shortage in the colony, it was not paid at the time of the marriage but years later. Mary had given birth to this son two years after her marriage and died in 1736 giving birth to Carter Braxton. His father did not remarry, but lived at the family's main Newington plantation as did his father (this boy's paternal grandfather) George Braxton, Sr.. The grandfather died in 1748 and his father died just over a year later, while this boy was still too young legally to inherit Newington or other property. His father was the son of Elizabeth Pallin, his grandfather's first wife and had been educated locally, then traveled to Williamsburg where he was a student at the College of William and Mary in 1720. His will indicated he wanted his sons educated, and George began attending the college in 1753 and with his brother (and an enslaved attendant) in 1754. Because neither boy had reached legal age when the two older men named George Braxton died, Speaker John Robinson (the colony's most powerful politician at the time), and their scholarly merchant neighbor Humphrey Hill served as guardians for both this boy (who inherited Newington and various lands in King and Queen and Essex County) and his brother Carter Braxton (who inherited 25,00 acres of land in Orange and Albemarle Counties to the west).

George Braxton III married Mary Blair of Williamsburg on December 6, 1753. Her Blair ancestors also had emigrated from Scotland, and become extremely influential in the colony's capital, Williamsburg, where James Blair had helped found the College of William and Mary. Her father was that man's nephew and heir, John Blair Sr.. Sources differ as to her first name, one naming her as Ann and another as Mary, and also disagree as to the identity of their three children who reached adulthood. All agree the couple had a son also named George ("Georgie") Braxton IV and a daughter Elizabeth ("Betsey") Braxton (1759–1818) who married Henry Whiting (1748–1786), the son of a burgess, who moved westward to Jefferson County and continued the family line. George Braxton IV was living in Richmond by 1781 and never had children. One genealogy lists their other child as Robert Carter Braxton, but he was the 13th son of this man's brother Carter Braxton, who purchased Elsing Green from William Dandridge with his inheritance when he reached legal age. Another names a daughter as "Molly", the diminutive of Mary, but both the couple's daughters named Mary died as children.

== Career ==
His paternal grandfather became one of the largest landowners in the Northern Neck of Virginia and probably one of the 100 largest in the colony, although considerably less wealthy and powerful than his maternal grandfather sometimes referred to as King Carter. The Braxtons' main plantation was Newington, on the bluffs above the Mattaponi River about 18 miles upstream from West Point, the county seat at the stream's confluence with the York River. However, the French and Indian War depressed tobacco prices, so he tried to grow indigo as a second cash crop, but he also spent money on racehorses as well as a landscape gardener. Because of entail, which limited inheritance to the male line and was repealed years after his death, Newington was inherited by his brother Carter Braxton rather than his daughter.

His father and grandfather owned a ship, "Braxton", and leased others to carry on a triangular trade with the West Indies and Britain. About once a year, the Braxtons served as commission agents for cargoes of enslaved Blacks.

Either his grandfather (or a combination of his grandfather and father according to one biographer) represented King and Queen County in the House of Burgesses for about three decades. Neither older Braxton was alive during two extended sessions sometimes incorrectly attributed to him, so King and Queen county voters at least twice elected this man as a burgess. Braxton Jr. served alongside his former guardian John Robinson, who would become the family's major benefactor, although a scandal erupted after Robinson's death.

== Death and legacy ==
Braxton suffered from pleurisy and died in 1761, shortly after Speaker Robinson, and was probably buried at Newington plantation, though he may have been buried at Mattaponi Church nearby with his mother.
