= Carter Braxton =

American Founding Father and politician (1736–1797)

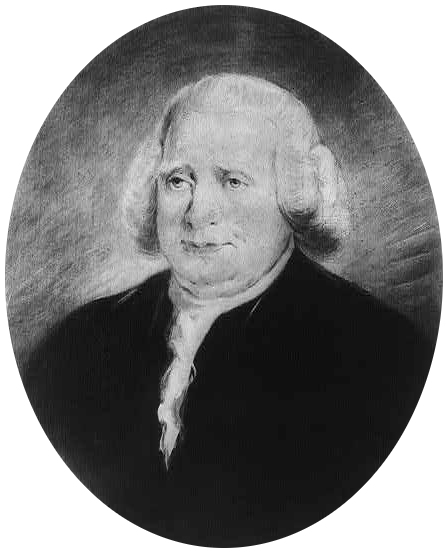
- Assumed portrait of Braxton

Delegate from Virginia to the Continental Congress
- In office November, 1775 – August 1776
- Preceded by: Carter Braxton
- Succeeded by: Mann Page

Member of the Virginia Governor's Council
- In office 1794–1797
- In office 1786–1791

Member of the Virginia House of Delegates representing King William County
- In office October 18, 1790 – November 10, 1795 Serving with John Roane (Jr.), William Dandridge Claiborne
- Preceded by: Benjamin Temple
- Succeeded by: Carter Braxton Jr.
- In office October 17, 1785 – October 15, 1786 Serving with Benjamin Temple
- Preceded by: Bernard Moore
- Succeeded by: William Dandridge Claiborne
- In office May 5, 1783 – May 1, 1784 Serving with Drury Ragsdale
- Preceded by: Bernard Moore
- Succeeded by: Benjamin Temple
- In office May 3, 1779 – May 1782 Serving with Holt Richeson
- Preceded by: Thomas Elliott
- Succeeded by: Bernard Moore
- In office October 7, 1776 – May 3, 1778 Serving with Richard Squire Taylor, William Dandridge Claiborne
- Preceded by: position created
- Succeeded by: Thomas Elliott

Member of the Virginia House of Burgesses representing King William County
- In office 1775–1776 Serving with William Aylett
- Preceded by: Augustine Moore
- Succeeded by: position abolished
- In office 1761–1771 Serving with Henry Gaines, Thomas Claiborne, Bernard Moore
- Preceded by: Peter Robinson
- Succeeded by: Philip Whitehead Claiborne

Personal details
- Born: September 10, 1736 King and Queen County, Virginia, British America
- Died: October 10, 1797 (aged 61) Richmond, Virginia, U.S.
- Education: College of William & Mary
- Known for: signer of the United States Declaration of Independence

Carter Braxton (September 10, 1736 – October 10, 1797) was a Founding Father of the United States, signer of the Declaration of Independence, merchant, and Virginia planter. A grandson of Robert "King" Carter, one of the wealthiest and most powerful landowners and slaveholders in Virginia, Braxton was active in Virginia's legislature for more than 25 years, generally allied with Landon Carter, Benjamin Harrison V, Edmund Pendleton and other conservative planters.

== Early life ==
Braxton was born on Newington Plantation in King and Queen County, Virginia, on September 10, 1736, but wrongly reported as dead along with his mother, Mary Carter Braxton, who "unhappily catching a Common Cold," died shortly after his birth.

His maternal grandfather, King Carter, possibly the wealthiest man as well as the largest landowner in Virginia at the time of his death, had bequeathed £2,000 to his youngest daughter, who became betrothed to George Braxton Jr. five months after her father's death (although her brother had not paid that full amount to her new husband by the time of her death). His paternal grandfather, George Braxton, Sr. by 1704 (before western lands were opened to European settlement) had also become one of the 100 largest landowners in Virginia's Northern Neck. His grandfather first won election to the House of Burgesses in 1718 and was re-elected many times, in 1728 alongside John Robinson, Jr., who would become the powerful Speaker of the House of Burgesses and benefactor of the Braxton family. The elder Braxton owned at least one ship, the Braxton that traded with the West Indies and elsewhere, and was commission agent for cargoes of enslaved blacks sold to Virginia planters. He died, aged 71, when Carter was twelve; his eldest son (Carter's father) George Jr. had succeeded him as delegate for King and Queen County in 1742 but died not long thereafter in 1749. Speaker Robinson and neighbor Humphrey Hill served as guardians for Carter and his slightly (3 year) elder brother George (who inherited Newington and various land in King and Queen and Essex County).

Educated at the College of William & Mary like his father and brother, Braxton followed family tradition at age 19 by marrying Judith Robinson, a wealthy heiress and the Speaker's niece. However, she died giving birth to their daughter, leaving Braxton two daughters, Mary and Judith. The young widower soon journeyed to England for two years, where like his elder brother he gained a reputation for extravagance. Upon returning to the colonies in 1760, Braxton bought Chericoke plantation (near Elsing Green, where he had lived with Judith and would ultimately die), to which he moved, married again and built a manor house in 1767. His second wife, Elizabeth Corbin, was the eldest daughter of Richard Corbin, deputy receiver general for his majesty's revenues in Virginia, and brought a £1000 dowry.

== Career as merchant and plantation owner ==
Braxton's elder brother died in October 1761, so Braxton inherited the rest of his grandfather's estate, which was by then burdened with significant debts so that creditors persuaded some land to be sold, but even after doing so Braxton owned more than 12,000 acres and about 165 slaves in the 1770s. Braxton purchased a small schooner shortly after his second marriage and like his father turned his energies to trade. Braxton traded between the West Indies and American colonies, establishing relationships with Bayard & Son of New York and Willing & Morris of Philadelphia. He also urged the Brown brothers of Providence, Rhode Island, who had abandoned the slave trade during the French and Indian War, to sell him African people, but such transactions may not have completed. Whether or not Braxton's mercantile enterprises included slave trading, he and his brother were accompanied by a black slave at the College of William & Mary.

Braxton later owned many more slaves on his various plantations which extended westward into those leased by tenant farmers in Amherst County. No records indicate any manumissions; nor does his will survive. At the end of the Revolutionary War, despite selling off some properties after his father's and brother's deaths and for his own debts, Braxton owned at least 12,000 acres and 165 slaves. Land poor at the conflict's end, six years later he owned about 8500 acres. Before his death, Braxton sold off or gave to his kinsmen all but 42 of his slaves and probably could only have farmed fewer than half of the remaining 3,900 acres. Braxton's racial attitudes, while common to his class, contrasted with those of another of King Carter's grandsons, Robert Carter III, and of George Mason IV, who fought against the slave trade during their legislative careers. Most persons with the name Carter Braxton since the end of the Civil War have been, and are, African-American, presumably descendants of slaves on Braxton's plantations.

== Early political career ==
Braxton began his long career representing King William County in the Virginia House of Burgesses, taking his seat in 1761, and winning re-election to that part-time position (except for in 1772 ) alongside several different men until Governor Lord Dunmore suspended the body as the American Revolutionary War began. However, his brother George died on October 3, 1761, leaving an insolvent estate, so the family lost Newington (which burned down, under other owners, in 1800). Although both high-living Braxtons had been considered wealthy, as well as political allies of Speaker John Robinson, when the John Robinson estate scandal broke in 1766, they turned out to be among the largest beneficiaries of the late speaker's interest-free loans of redeemed paper money supposed to have been burned.

In addition to his duties as a Burgess, Braxton served as sheriff of King William County (a lucrative position for which he briefly resigned his position as Burgess), colonel of its militia, and vestryman of the troubled St. John's Church about ten miles east of his Chericoke plantation. Factional disputes within the parish (which assessed members to support not only the rector but the parish poor) grew so severe that the House of Burgesses held hearings and ultimately passed a special bill dissolving the vestry, as Braxton had wished.

Although always considered a moderate or conservative politician, Braxton signed the First Virginia Association intended to protest the Townshend duties on tea and other products, but like his ally Landon Carter, not the Second Association which set up boycott compliance mechanism, nor the Third Virginia Association pledging not to purchase various East Indian commodities. However, in 1774 Braxton returned to Williamsburg as King William County's delegate (with William Aylett), and joined 108 others in the Fourth Virginia Association, which authorized local committees of safety as well as volunteer militia. When Lord Dunmore seized the colony's gunpowder and flintlocks for their rifles, Braxton helped negotiate a compromise between fellow legislator Patrick Henry and his own father-in-law Corbin that averted a crisis.

== Reluctant revolutionary and Virginia moderate ==
Braxton was "a moderate politician during the Revolution—often viewed as sympathetic to the British (but not a Loyalist)." Although absent at some sessions, he had represented his county sixteen times between 1761 and Lord Dunmore's dissolution of the House of Burgesses; Braxton also served as the county delegate (alongside William Aylett, and sometimes with a third man) in all five sessions of the Virginia Convention. In 1774, Braxton joined the patriots' Committee of Safety in Virginia, as well as chaired the legislative committee considering legal penalties for Tories.

When Peyton Randolph died unexpectedly in Philadelphia in October 1775, fellow Virginia legislators elected Braxton to take his place in the Continental Congress. He served in the Congress from February 1776 until August, when Virginia reduced its delegation to five members. In that capacity Braxton signed the Declaration of Independence, although he had previously opposed it as premature in Committee of the Whole, and explained his stance in several letters to his uncle Landon Carter. Braxton also drew revolutionaries' criticism for his pamphlet, Address to the Convention, which he had printed in reply to the proposals of John Adams's Thoughts on Government.

Afterwards Braxton returned to the House of Burgesses, which thanked him and Thomas Jefferson for their service, although King William voters failed to re-elect the absent Braxton as one of their delegates (so he missed the two sessions in 1778). Moreover, his house at Chericoke burned down shortly before Christmas in 1776, so Braxton moved his family to Grove House near West Point, Virginia. Through most of his legislative career, Braxton was a political opponent of the Lee family (since its involvement in the Robinson estate scandal), and he also became involved in a press quarrel with anti-slavery activist and diplomat Arthur Lee, supposedly concerning Silas Deane's mercantile and diplomatic activities. Between 1776 and 1785, Braxton served in 8 of the 11 legislative assemblies and attended 14 of 21 sessions, with a special concern for debt and tax moratoriums or other relief.

== Financial speculation and troubles ==
Braxton invested a great deal of his wealth in the American Revolution. Like Robert Morris, Braxton loaned money to the cause, as well as funded shipping and privateering (and lost about half of the 14 ships in which he held interests). Braxton (with fellow businessmen including Morris and Benjamin Harrison) sold Virginia and Carolina tobacco and corned meat abroad, and secured arms and ammunition (unsuccessfully, most colonies preferring arms supplied by foreign governments on favorable terms), as well as wheat and salt, and cloth and other trade goods. In 1780, the Continental Congress censured Braxton for his role in the Phoenix affair of 1777, in which his privateer seized a neutral Portuguese vessel from Brazil, prompting diplomatic protests. The British also destroyed some of Braxton's plantations during the war.

In addition to the indebtedness incurred after the deaths of his father and brother, and through his own relatively poor agricultural business practices, Braxton accumulated war debts from the Continental Congress and also of Robert Morris, both of which proved slow to repay. In 1786 Braxton sold a plantation and rented a smaller residence ("row-house") in Richmond, which (with the depreciated paper currency) allowed him to repay his own indebtedness to the Robinson estate in 1787.

In 1787, Braxton sued Robert Morris in Henrico County court for £28,257, but the lawsuit continued for eight years before commissioners were appointed, then Morris appealed. Finally, Virginia's Court of Appeals led by Edmund Pendleton decided mostly in favor of Braxton before Morris was forced into bankruptcy by his own continued land speculations (although Morris as late as 1800 believed he should have won £20,000). In 1791, Braxton also purchased Strawberry Hill outside Richmond for his wife (who had received nothing upon her father's death, all his property being given to his sons), and conveyed it to his sons Carter Jr. and Corbin to hold for their mother's benefit. Braxton's biographer does not believe that Braxton hid assets from his creditors by placing them in relatives' names, although his widow later attempted to recover dower rights in land and slaves that her husband sold in his last years. His sons-in-law, Robert Page and John White (husbands of Molly and Judith, his daughters by his first wife) paid creditors more than £2,000 on Braxton's behalf.

On November 15, 1785, fellow delegates elected Braxton to the Council of State (which handled the executive functions formerly performed by the Privy Council). Receiving the paid position vacated by William Nelson, Jr., Braxton moved to Richmond, which had become the capital in 1780. Ineligible for re-election for three years, Braxton was elected a second time in 1794.

== Death and legacy ==
Braxton died, aged 61, in his Richmond home on October 10, 1797. Family tradition maintains Henrico County sheriff Samuel Mosby was at Braxton's door attempting to collect debts lest he have to pay them himself. His widow survived until July 5, 1814, and was praised in an obituary for the assistance and comfort she had offered Braxton during his final years (during which he suffered two or more strokes during Council meetings).

A biographer speculated that Braxton may be the Founding Father with the most descendants, since he and his second wife may have had as many as sixteen children, in addition to his two daughters with his first wife. Although none of Braxton's sons (George, Corbin, Carter Jr., John Tayloe, William) lived as long as their father, they and their sisters had numerous children, many of whom fought for the Confederate Army during the American Civil War. Carter Braxton Jr. and Corbin Braxton continued this man's tradition of legislative service. Grandsons who served the Confederacy (all achieving the rank of Major) include: Carter Moore Braxton of the Fredericksburg Artillery, Tomlinson Braxton, M.D. and Elliott Muse Braxton (who was later elected to the Forty-second Congress and served from March 4, 1871 – March 3, 1873). Confederate General Braxton Bragg was named for the signer, but not apparently a descendant. Another great-grandson, John W. Stevenson of Kentucky, served two terms as U.S. Representative before the Civil War, and later won election as governor in 1868 and U.S. Senator in 1871, before retiring to his law practice and becoming president of the American Bar Association. Virginia lawyer Allen Caperton Braxton, who led efforts to limit blacks' access to education and voting, particularly during Virginia's Constitutional Convention in 1902, proclaimed his descent from Carter Braxton, as did his brother Capt. Carter Braxton (who like his brother was Commonwealth Attorney for Staunton, then served as an officer of the Virginia volunteer militia in the Spanish American War).

Carter Braxton may have been buried at Chericoke, which remains in the family's possession today. Although it burned in 1776, Braxton rebuilt it and gave it to his eldest son George on his marriage to Mary Walker Carter (daughter of Charles Carter of Shirley) in 1781 (which transfer survived despite legal attacks by his creditors). However, when the family graves there were moved to Hollywood Cemetery in Richmond in 1910, his could not be located; a monument was erected for him nonetheless. Nearby Elsing Green also survives and is available for tourism.

Braxton County, West Virginia, was named in his honor. The World War II Liberty Ship SS Carter Braxton was named in his honor. For a brief time during the 1960s to the early 1980s, the Waterman Steamship Company owned a break bulk freighter, SS Carter Braxton, which was named in his honor. The Newington Archaeological Site was listed on the National Register of Historic Places in 2010.

== See also ==
- Memorial to the 56 Signers of the Declaration of Independence

== Other sources ==
- Charles Rappleye, Sons of Providence: The Brown Brothers, the Slave Trade, and the American Revolution (Simon & Schuster, New York, 2006)
- Biographical sketch at the National Park Service
