= Elsing Green =

Historic house in Virginia, United States

- U.S. National Register of Historic Places
- U.S. National Historic Landmark
- Virginia Landmarks Register
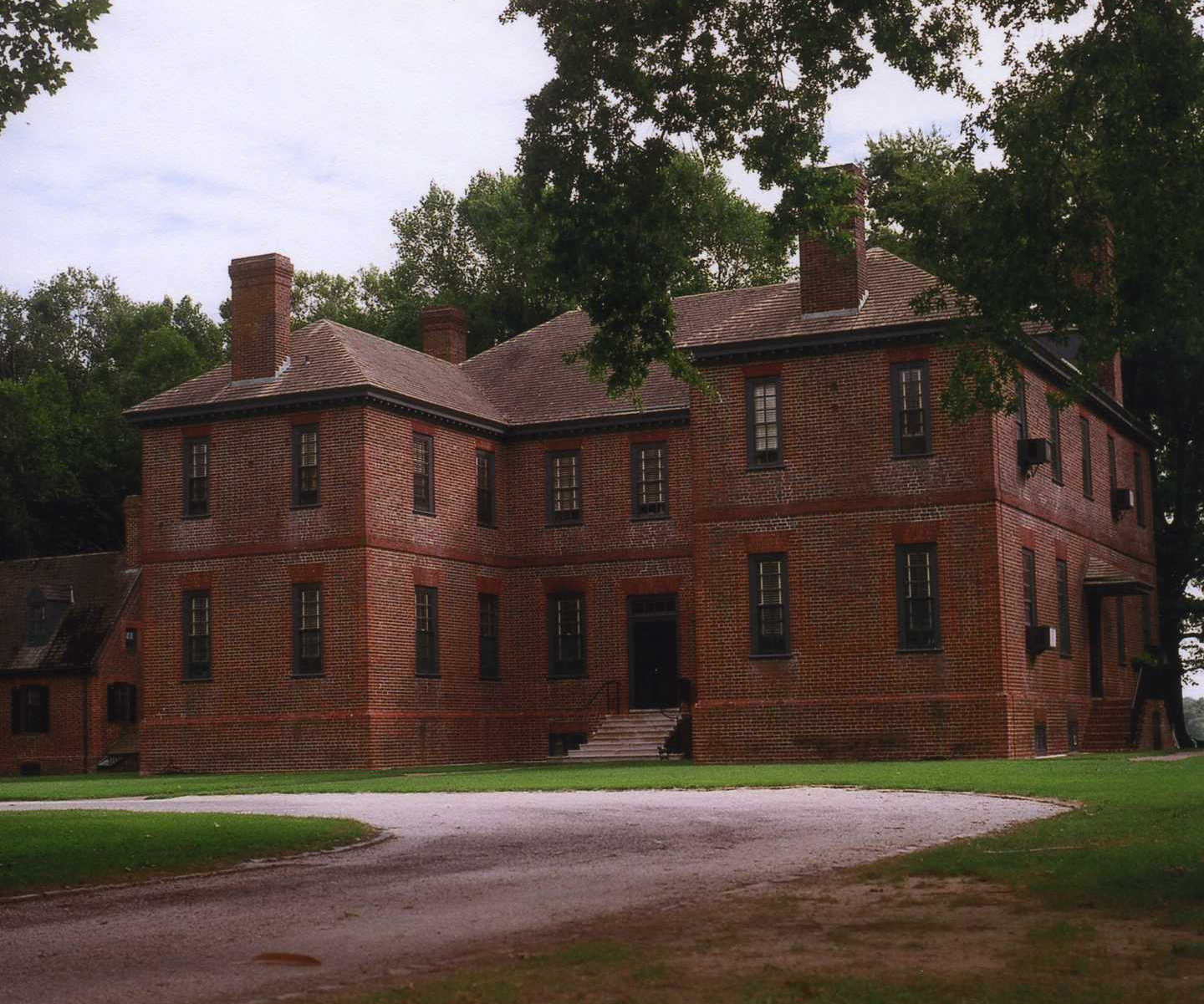
- Elsing Green Plantation manor house

- Location within Virginia Location within the United States
- Location: SW of jct. of SR 632 and 623, near Tunstall, Virginia
- Coordinates: 37°36′08.80″N 77°03′03.97″W
- Built: 1758
- Architectural style: Georgian
- NRHP reference No.: 69000252
- VLR No.: 050-0022

Significant dates
- Added to NRHP: November 12, 1969
- Designated NHL: November 11, 1971
- Designated VLR: May 13, 1969

Elsing Green Plantation, a National Historic Landmark and wildlife refuge, rests upon nearly 3,000 acres (1,200 ha) along the Pamunkey River in King William County, Virginia, a rural county on the western end of the state's middle peninsula, approximately 33 miles (53 km) northeast of the Richmond. The 18th-century plantation, now owned by the Lafferty family, has been in continuous operation for more than 300 years. In addition to the plantation house, dependency buildings and cultivated land, Elsing Green includes 2,454 acres (993 ha) of surrounding farmland, forest and marsh land. Elsing Green has been on the Virginia Landmarks Register and the National Register of Historic Places since 1969, and received formal National Historic Landmark status in 1971.

Its history dates back nearly three centuries with ties to the West family of Thomas West, 3rd Baron De La Warr (a/k/a Lord Delaware). The original structure, a brick Jacobean lodge now serving as the east dependency of the manor house, was built before 1690 by his descendant, Colonel John West. Lord Delaware used the building as his hunting lodge, supposedly escaping to the King William woods by way of the Pamunkey River. Now primarily a wildlife refuge, no hunting is allowed on the property or surrounding wetlands.

== History ==
Although fire during the American Civil War destroyed many of the records detailing the history of Elsing Green, the Lafferty Foundation holds to what it believes as an accurate account of the plantation's history.

The plantation was passed down through the West family after the death of Colonel John West in 1692. Col. William Dandridge, who served on the Governor's Council from 1727 until 1743 and whose descendant would become the father of George Washington's wife, Martha Dandridge Custis, named the plantation after his home parish, Elsing, in Norfolk, England. He built a house, as well as a kitchen outbuilding between 1715 and 1720. Tradition claims that Martha Custis Washington actually rode her horse through the house.

Carter Braxton, a Founding Father and signer of the United States Declaration of Independence, bought the plantation in 1753. According to a plaque on the building, he built the Queen Anne manor house in 1758. Dissatisfied with the results, or because of financial problems, he sold the plantation. Several additional inheritances and purchases followed. In 1820 William Gregory purchased the property, and descendants continued to live on the property for at least another century, including C.S.A. veteran and later judge Roger Gregory (d. 1920), who helped found the law school of Richmond College (now the University of Richmond School of Law). In the 1930s Beverly D. Causey purchased the degraded property and restored it.

In 1950, Edgar R. Lafferty Jr., and his wife, Margaret, continued the restoration and expanded the plantation by adding previously purchased land adjacent to Elsing Green. The Lafferty family formed the Lafferty Foundation to help preserve and protect Elsing Green after Edgar Lafferty Jr.’s death. To further ensure its preservation, Lafferty granted historic preservation easements to the Virginia Historic Landmarks Commission and the Virginia Outdoors Foundation, and his foundation acquired the plantation after Edgar Lafferty, Jr.’s death.

== Architecture and furnishings ==
The exterior of the Queen Anne manor house is Flemish bond brickwork, with its erection dating back to between 1715 and 1720. It is two-stories and U-shaped, with east and west wings jutting to the north. Doors on either side of the wing lead to a detached east dependency home (the original hunting lodge) and a west kitchen house. The Pamunkey River lies just 250 yards (230 m) from the home.

The home features 18th-century American and English furniture, including the "Surrender Table" on which the American and French negotiated terms of surrender with the English over the Battle of Yorktown of the American Revolutionary War.

== See also ==
- List of the oldest buildings in Virginia
- List of National Historic Landmarks in Virginia
- National Register of Historic Places listings in King William County, Virginia
