= Newington Archaeological Site =

Archaeological site in Virginia, United States

- U.S. National Register of Historic Places
- Virginia Landmarks Register
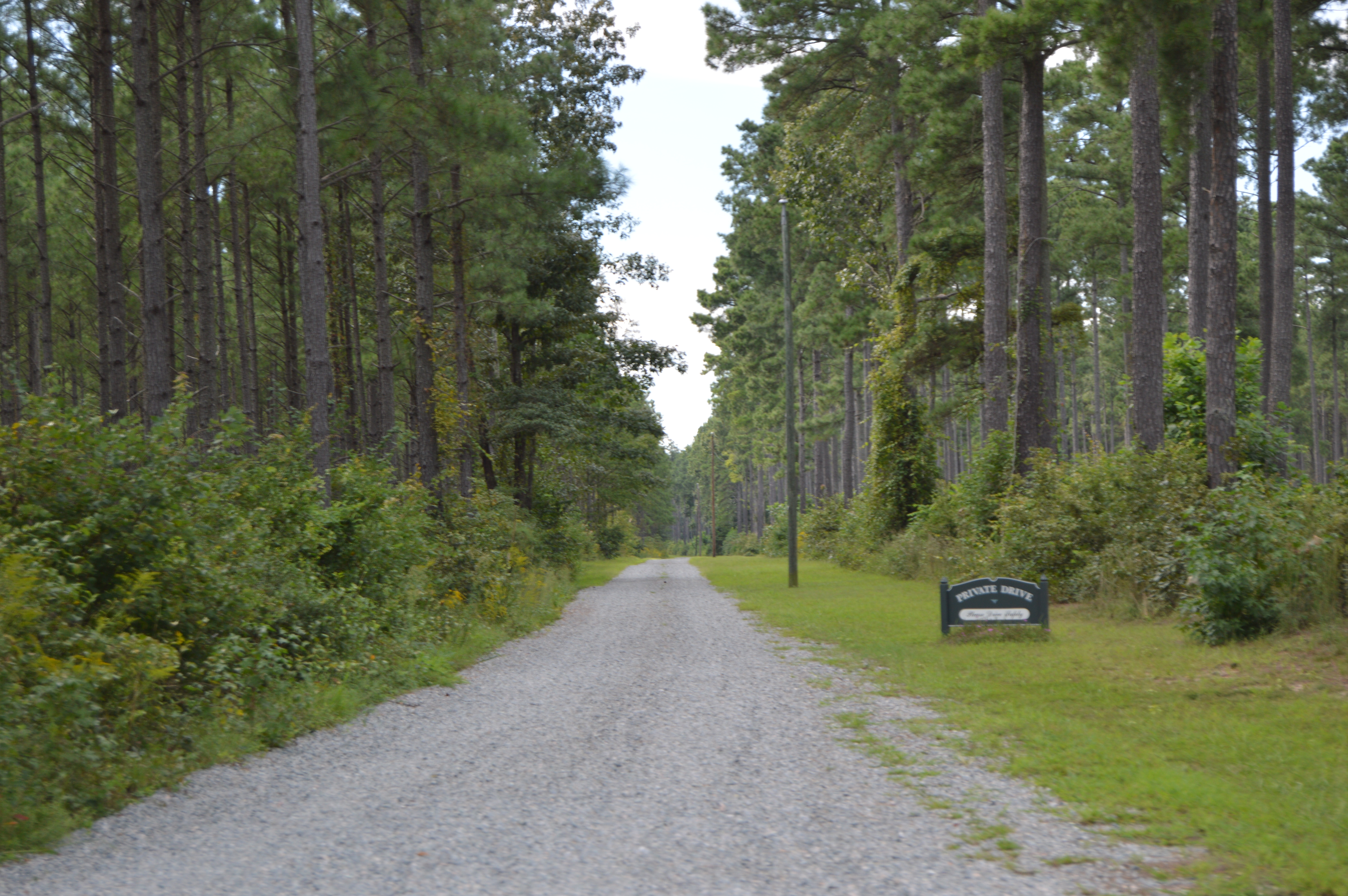
- Property entrance

- Location within Virginia Location within the United States
- Location: 697 Frazier Ferry Rd, King and Queen Courthouse, Virginia
- Coordinates: 37°40′20″N 76°54′12″W
- Area: 9.2 acres (3.7 ha)
- NRHP reference No.: 10000146
- VLR No.: 049-0096

Significant dates
- Added to NRHP: March 31, 2010
- Designated VLR: December 17, 2009

Newington Archaeological Site is a historic plantation and archaeological site located at King and Queen Courthouse, King and Queen County, Virginia. It was the birthplace and childhood home of Founding Father Carter Braxton, a signatory of the Declaration of Independence. Both the original plantation and its reconstruction had burnt down by the first decade of the 20th century. The property contains both archaeological ruins and surviving landscape elements from the former 18th century plantation. While a stone building is the only above ground 18th century structure remaining, among other ruins, the location of the plantation mansion, two outbuilding foundations, and two cellars have been identified. The existing landscape elements include a cemetery, historic road, and the terraces of a falling garden. The property also contains Native American deposits associated mostly with the Woodland period (1200 BC – AD 1600).

It was listed on the National Register of Historic Places in 2010.
