= George Braxton Sr. =

George Braxton

Member of the House of Burgesses from King and Queen County, Colony of Virginia
- In office 1742-1749 Serving with John Robinson
- Preceded by: Gawin Corbin
- Succeeded by: Philip Johnson
- In office 1718-1734 Serving with John Baylor, Robert Beverley, Richard Johnson, John Robinson
- Preceded by: Gawin Corbin
- Succeeded by: Gawin Corbin

Personal details
- Born: 1677
- Died: July 1, 1748 (aged 70–71) Newington plantation, King and Queen County, Colony of Virginia
- Relations: Carter Braxton (grandson)
- Children: George Braxton, Jr. (son)
- Occupation: merchant, Planter, politician

George Braxton Sr. (1677 – July 1, 1748) was a merchant, planter, and politician who emigrated from the Kingdom of England to the Virginia colony. He represented King and Queen County in the House of Burgesses for multiple terms. His grandson Carter Braxton became a Founding Father of the United States.

== Career ==
Braxton owned 2825 acres in King and Queen County by 1704. His main plantation was Newington, on the bluffs above the Mattaponi River He became one of the largest landowners in the Northern Neck of Virginia. He and his namesake son also owned a ship, "Braxton", and leased others to carry on a triangular trade with the West Indies and Britain. About once a year, the Braxtons traded in enslaved Africans.

Braxton accepted the governor's appointment as colonel of the King and Queen county militia, as well as coroner and one of the justices of the peace who collectively administered the county.

King and Queen county voters first elected Braxton as one of their two representatives in the House of Burgesses in 1718, and he served (with a gap) for about three decades. Beginning in 1728, Braxton served alongside John Robinson, who would become the family's major benefactor. Braxton also served on the select committee that assisted the governor in building the Governor's Palace in Williamsburg.

== Personal life ==
By 1702, Braxton had married Elizabeth Pallin, daughter of planter Thomas Paullin. Both husband and wife signed the loyalty assurance of 1702 to the dying king. They had a son, George Braxton Jr. (who was attending the College of William and Mary by 1720) and daughters Hannah and Elizabeth who reached adulthood. Hannah married Philemon Bird and after his death Thomas Price of nearby Middlesex County. Elizabeth married Col. Humphrey Brooke of King William County. Their son George Brooke would become Treasurer of Virginia.

== Death and legacy ==
Braxton died on July 1, 1748. A memorial plaque at Mattaponi Church (which in his day was the Lower Church of St. Stephen's parish and rebuilt in 1730-1734) honors his service. Although his son George Braxton Jr. was his principal heir, when his grandson George Braxton III died in 1761, most of the family properties (by then subject to significant debts) were inherited by Carter Braxton.
