= Tavener =

Tavener may refer to:

- Tavener (surname), notable people with this surname
  - "Tavener" in a musical context often refers to John Tavener (1944–2013), English composer
- Tavener, Texas, an unincorporated community in Fort Bend County, Texas, U.S.
- Tavener-Sears Tavern, a historic building in Mount Sterling, Muskingum County, Ohio, U.S.

== See also ==
- Taverner (disambiguation)
