= Tavernier (surname) =

Tavernier is a French occupational surname meaning innkeeper. Related surnames include Taverner, Tavenner, and Letavernier.

Notable people with the surname include:

- Alexandra Tavernier (born 1993), French hammer thrower
- Alphonse Tavernier (1852–1933), French painter and Provençal poet
- Andrea Tavernier (1858–1932), Italian painter
- Annabel Tavernier (born 1989), Belgian politician
- Bertrand Tavernier (1941–2021), French filmmaker
- Boris Tavernier (born 1979), French politician
- Colo Tavernier O'Hagan (1942–2020), British–French screenwriter, wife of Bertrand Tavernier
- Jacques Tavernier (1625–1673), French privateer and buccaneer
- James Tavernier (born 1991), English footballer
- Janine Tavernier (1935–2019), Haitian poet, novelist and academic
- Jean Tavernier (1928–2020), French politician
- Jean-Baptiste Tavernier (1605–1689), French merchant and traveller
- Jef Tavernier (born 1951), Belgian politician
- Jules Tavernier (painter) (1844–1889), French painter
- Kevaughn Tavernier (born 2006), Canadian soccer player
- Marcus Tavernier (born 1999), English footballer
- Melchior Tavernier (1594–1665), French engraver and printmaker
- Nils Tavernier (born 1965), French film director, son of Bertrand Tavernier
- Paul Tavernier (1852–1943), French painter
- Prades Tavernier (fl. late 13th-early 14th centuries), French weaver and Cathar Perfect
- René Tavernier (geologist) (1914–1992), Belgian geologist and stratigrapher
- René Tavernier (poet) (1915–1989), French writer and philosopher, father of Bertrand Tavernier
- Yves Tavernier (born 1962), French alpine skier

== Fictional characters ==
- Celestine and Etta Tavernier, from EastEnders
- Clyde Tavernier, from EastEnders
- Hattie Tavernier, from EastEnders
- Jules Tavernier (EastEnders), from EastEnders
- Adele Tavernier, from Reverse: 1999

== See also ==
- Taverner (surname)
