= Tavener (surname) =

Tavener is a surname. Notable people with the surname include:

- Colin Tavener (born 1945), English professional footballer
- Jackie Tavener (1897–1969), American professional baseball player
- John Tavener (disambiguation), several people
  - John Tavener (1944–2013), English composer
  - John Tavener (American football) (1921–1993), American football player
  - John Tavener (baseball) (1897–1969), American baseball player
- Mark Tavener (1954–2007), English writer, humorist, and dramatist
- Robert Tavener (1920–2004), English printmaker, illustrator, and teacher

== See also ==
- Tavener (disambiguation)
- Taverner (surname)
