= Samay Huasi =

Coordinates: 29°10′28″S 67°28′46″W

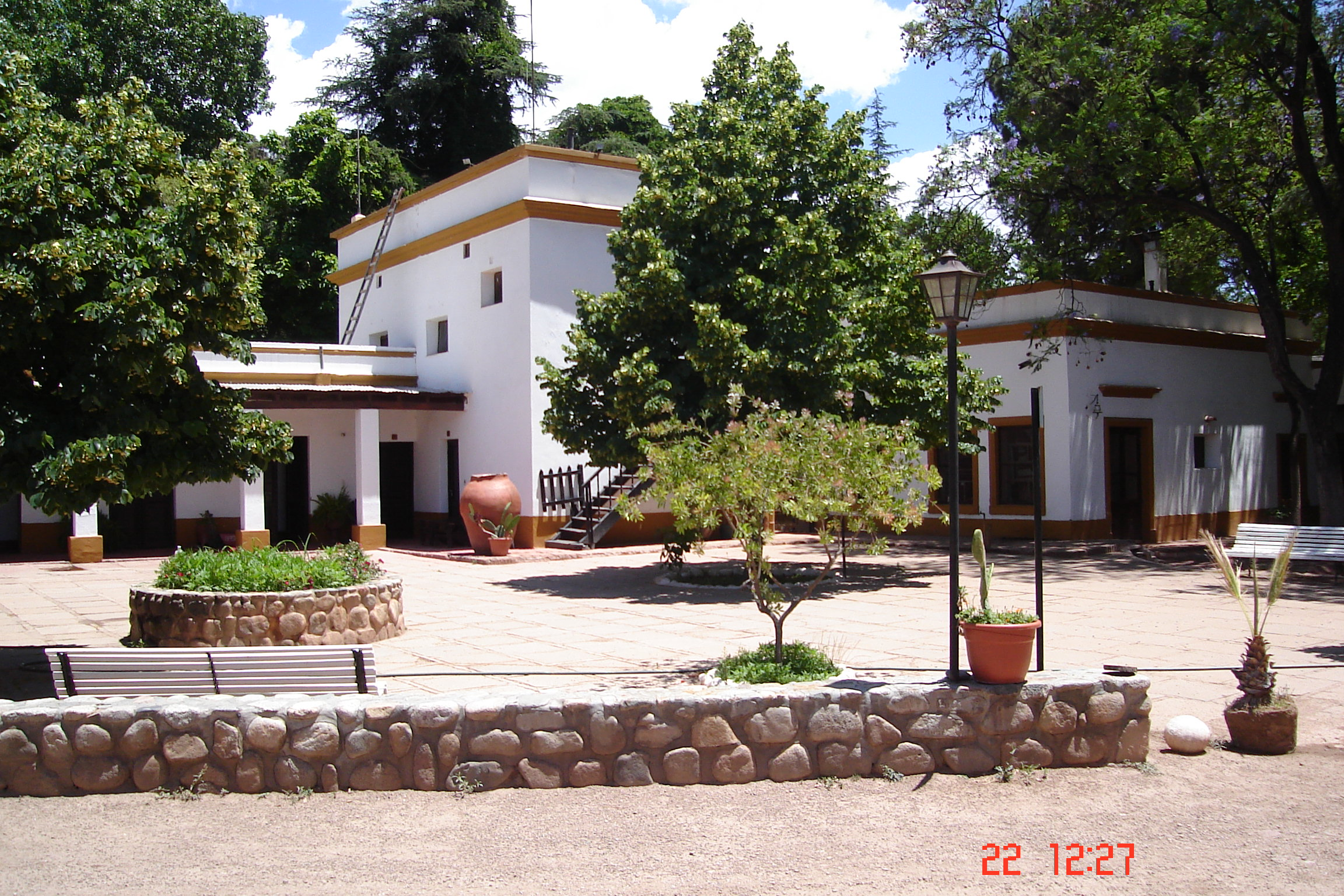
Samay Huasi

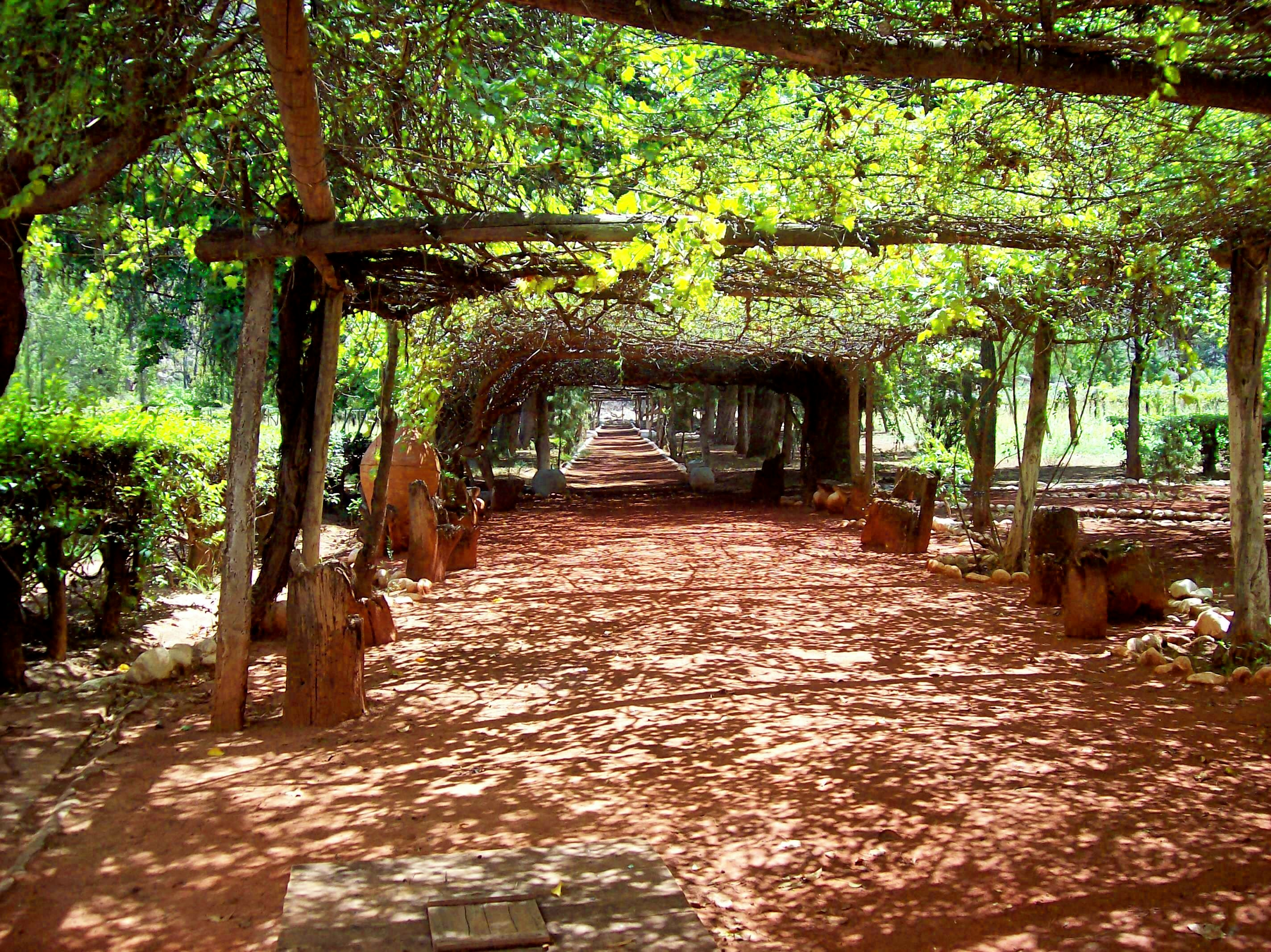
Vineyard

Samay Huasi (from Quechua Samay Wasi, samay rest, to rest, wasi house, "rest house") is a historic property in Argentina functioning as both a vacation retreat, as well as a museum.

== Overview ==
Located in Chilecito, a town located high in the Pampas Sierras of La Rioja Province, the property originally belonged to William Treloar, a British mining engineer who purchased it as a retirement property in the late 19th century. His earlier profession had acquainted him with Dr. Joaquín V. González, who was one of the nation's most prominent Mining Law attorneys, and had been Governor of La Rioja from 1889 to 1891. Treloar bequeathed La Carrera, his scenic finca, to his friend, and González inherited the 17 hectares (42 acres) property in 1913.

The new owner kept Treloar's vineyards and orchards, expanded the living quarters, converted the horse stables into ten bedrooms for each of his sons, and renamed the finca Samay Huasi. González, who served as president of the University of La Plata from 1905 to 1913, in turn willed Samay Huasi to the university, and died in 1923.

The University of La Plata formally took possession of Samay Huasi in 1941, and originally maintained it as the Casa de Descanso para Artistas y Escritores, a vacation lodge for artists and writers; the lodge was later reserved of university staff. A portion was set aside in 1960 for the establishment of a museum displaying González's collections of anthropological and geological material, as well as his numerous manuscripts (he published over 50 books and 1,000 articles), and other belongings. The museum was named Mis Montañas in honor of González's 1903 book describing the nearby Talampaya area and other Andes landscapes.

Samay Huasi also houses an art gallery, the Antonio Alice Pinacotheca. Named for Antonio Alice, an Argentine portraiteur and historical painter who (among many other works) had created a portrait of González in 1917, the gallery displays art from a variety of Argentine painters.
