= Tavernier =

Tavernier may refer to:

- Tavernier (surname)
- Tavernier, Florida, United States of America
- Tavernier Blue, the precursor diamond to the Blue Diamond of the French Crown
- Tavernier River, a tributary of the Mégiscane River in Senneterre, Quebec, Canada

== See also ==
- Taverner (disambiguation)
- Taverniera, a genus of legume
