= George Philip Philes =

George Philip Philes (b. Ithaca, New York, 15 April 1828; d. New York City, 12 September 1913) was a bibliographer. He was educated at Ithaca Academy and the classical institute of August Maasberg, Göttingen, and moved to New York City in 1854, engaged as a bookseller and publisher. Dartmouth College gave him the degree of M.A. in 1858. Mr. Philes was a fine linguist and a high authority on American bibliography. He contributed to literary journals under the pen-name of “Paulus Silentiarius,” edited The Philobiblion (2 vols., New York, 1862-1863), and assisted in preparing the Bibliotheca Americana Vetustissima, compiled by Henry Harrisse (1866). He also issued The Bhagvat-Geeta, or Dialogues of Kreeshna and Arjoon (1807); a reprint in black letter of the Proverbes, or Adagies translated from Erasmus, by Rycharde Tauerner, London, 1550 (1867); How to Read a Book in the Best Way (1873); Bibliotheca Curiosa: Catalogue of the Library of Andrew J. Odell, (2 vols., printed privately, 1878-1879); and Monograph on the 'First English Bible' printed in the United States of America, with facsimiles, of which twenty-five copies were printed for private distribution (1887).
