= John Taverner (disambiguation) =

John Taverner (1490–1545) was an English composer.

John Taverner may also refer to:

- John Taverner (priest), (1584–1638)
- John le Taverner, MP for Bristol in 1295, 1298 and 1306 and Mayor of Bristol
- John le Taverner (1322 MP), MP for Bristol in 1322
- John le Taverner (Wycombe MP), MP for Wycombe in 1338
- John William Taverner, former MP in the Victorian Legislative Assembly

== See also ==
- John Tavener (disambiguation)
