= Tavenner =

Tavenner is a surname. Notable people with the surname include:

- Clyde Howard Tavenner (1882–1942), American politician
- Frank S. Tavenner (1866–1950), American politician
- Frank S. Tavenner Jr. (1895–1964), American lawyer
- John V. Tavenner (died 1913), American politician from Virginia
- Marilyn Tavenner (born 1951), American government official and healthcare executive

== See also ==
- Tavenner House
