= Antonio Alice =

Argentine painter

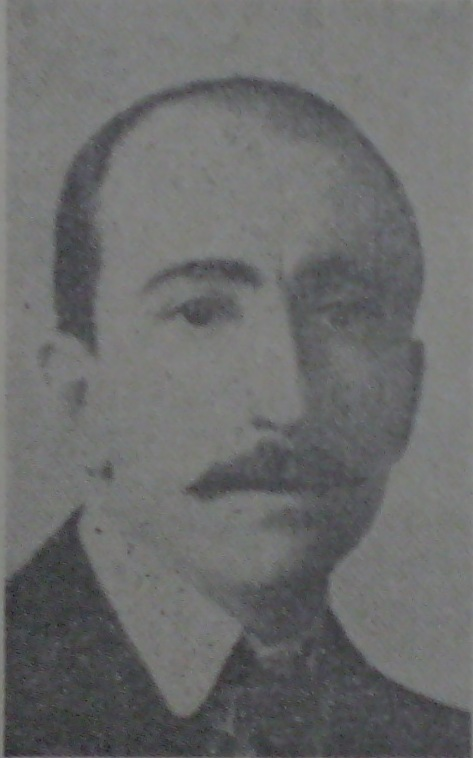
- Antonio Alice
- Born: February 23, 1886; Buenos Aires, Argentina
- Died: August 24, 1943 (aged 57); Buenos Aires, Argentina
- Education: Decoroso Bonifanti; Royal Academy of Painting, Turin
- Known for: Portrait painting
- Notable work: San Martín en el destierro
- Awards: Prix de Rome (1904)

Antonio Alice (23 February 1886 – 24 August 1943) was an Argentine portrait painter. He was awarded the Prix de Rome in 1904.

== Early years ==
Alice, of Italian descent, was born in Buenos Aires, Argentina. His father, an Italian immigrant, was barely literate. His two sisters, Matilde and Santina, posed for several of his paintings.

Expelled from school and considered incorrigible for drawing in his textbooks, Alice went to work as a shoeblack. At the age of 11, while sketching Gaucho portraits between shoe shines, he was discovered by Cupertino del Campo, who went on to become the director of the National Museum of Fine Arts of Buenos Aires. Del Campo referred Alice to the painter, Decoroso Bonifanti who gave the boy his first painting lesson in 1897.

In 1904, he was awarded the Prix de Rome (Premio Roma) and entered the Royal Academy of Painting in Turin, studying under Giacomo Grosso, Francisco Gilardi, and Andrea Tavernier. During his four years at the Academy, he was awarded three Gold Medals.

== Career ==
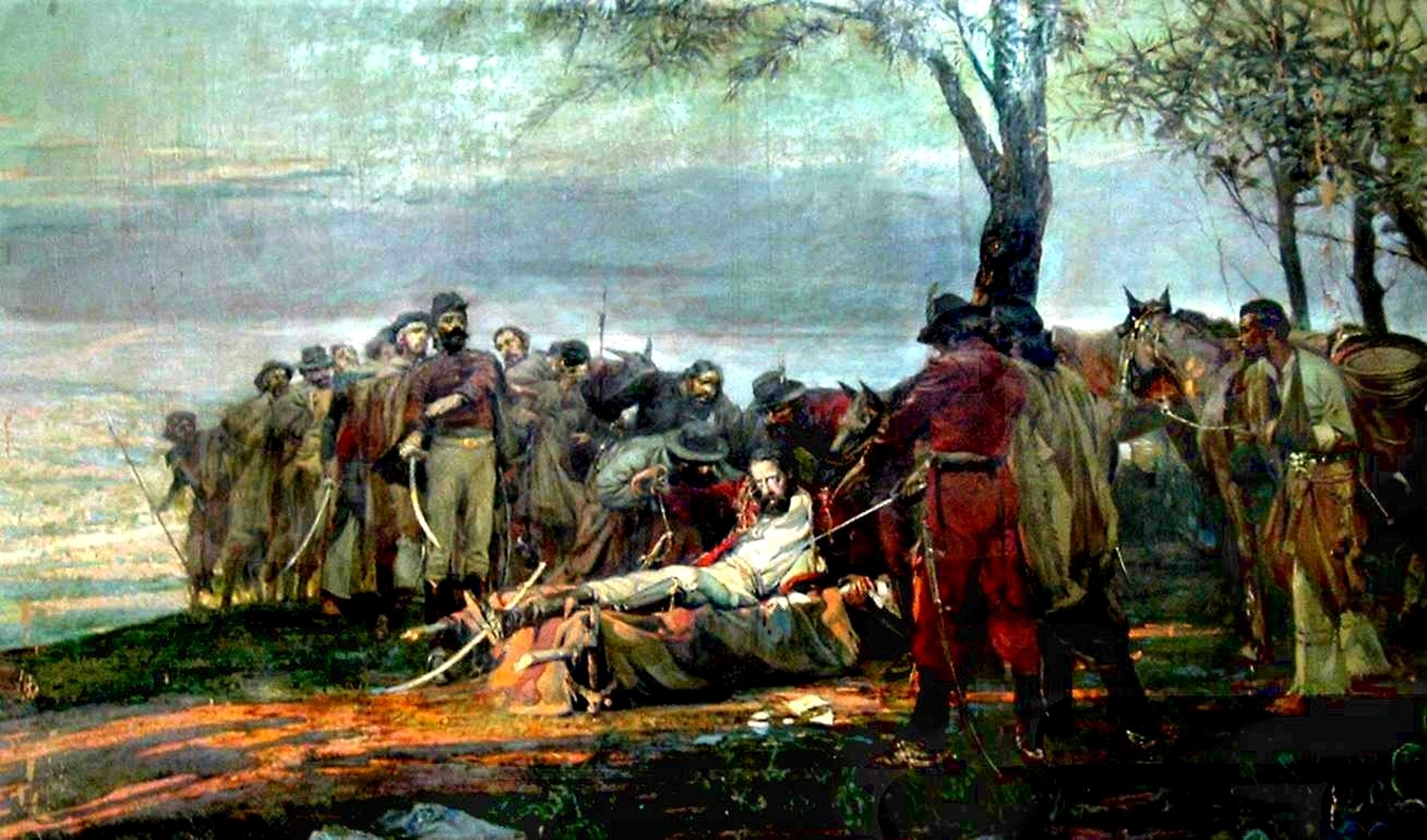
La muerte de Güemes (1910)

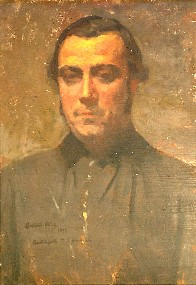
Portrait of the priest and politician, Benjamín Lavaisse (ca. 1920)

At the 1908 Quadriennale di Torino, his Portrait of the Painter Decoroso Bonifanti won acclaim, and in 1911 in Buenos Aires, he received the painting prize at the 1st Salon Nacional de Bellas Artes for Portrait of a Lady. Salon des Artistes Français. San Martin en el destierro, painted in 1913 in Paris, is considered one of his best works. He was awarded the Silver Medal at the Salon des Artistes Français in 1914, which included an annually exhibited hors concours painting. His painting La muerte de Güemes, which received a Gold Medal at the 1910 Centenary of National Independence Exposition, was later purchased for display by the Salta Provincial Government.

In 1915, he won the Medal of Honor in paintings at the Panama–Pacific International Exposition in San Francisco, California, USA. Three years later, he exhibited 60 Brazilian canvases in Rio de Janeiro.

Alice painted several portraits of notable Argentines of his time, including General Julio Argentino Roca, Joaquín Víctor González, and Marcelino Ugarte. Other important works were large canvases with the theme of patriotic exaltation, including "San Martín en Boulogne-sur-Mer, Argentina, Tierra de promisión, and Los Constituyentes de 1853.

== Criticism ==
"Exploring the history, look at its inexhaustible source, reasons for our creations. Through art, we help to disseminate the history of Argentina and thereby give a sound example of love of country." —Antonio Alice

At the 10th Salon Nacional de Bellas Artes, his work was described by the painter and art critic José León Pagano (1875-1964) as "struggling in vain with an ingrate theme...and his effort is limited to giving us a violent note and doubtful taste."

== Later life ==
Alice died in Buenos Aires in 1943 at the age of 57.
