= National University of Chilecito =

University in Chilecito

Coordinates: 29°09′24″S 67°28′17″W

- Universidad Nacional de Chilecito
- Type: Public
- Established: 2002
- Rector: Norberto Caminoa
- Academic staff: 215
- Students: 1,157
- Location: Chilecito, La Rioja, Argentina
- Website: www.undec.edu.ar

The National University of Chilecito (Spanish: Universidad Nacional de Chilecito, UNDEC) is an Argentine national university situated in the city of Chilecito, La Rioja. The institution was established by the decree of the National Executive Branch No. 2,615 on December 16, 2002, on the Chilecito campus of the National University of La Rioja. It maintains schools of Law, Engineering, Licentiate, Technology, and Education.

== See also ==
- Science and Education in Argentina
- Argentine Higher Education Official Site
- Argentine Universities
