= Chilecito =

- City
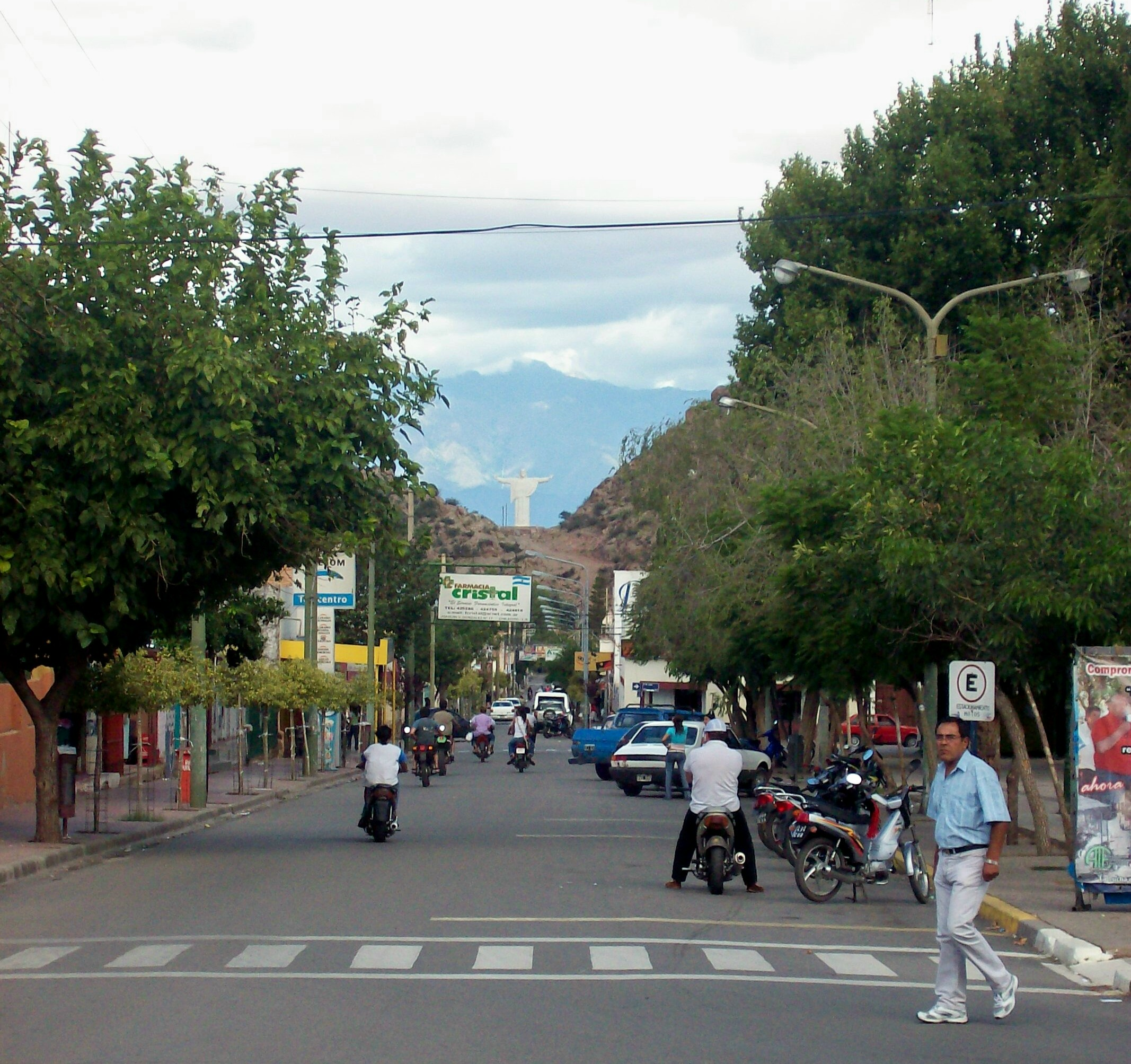

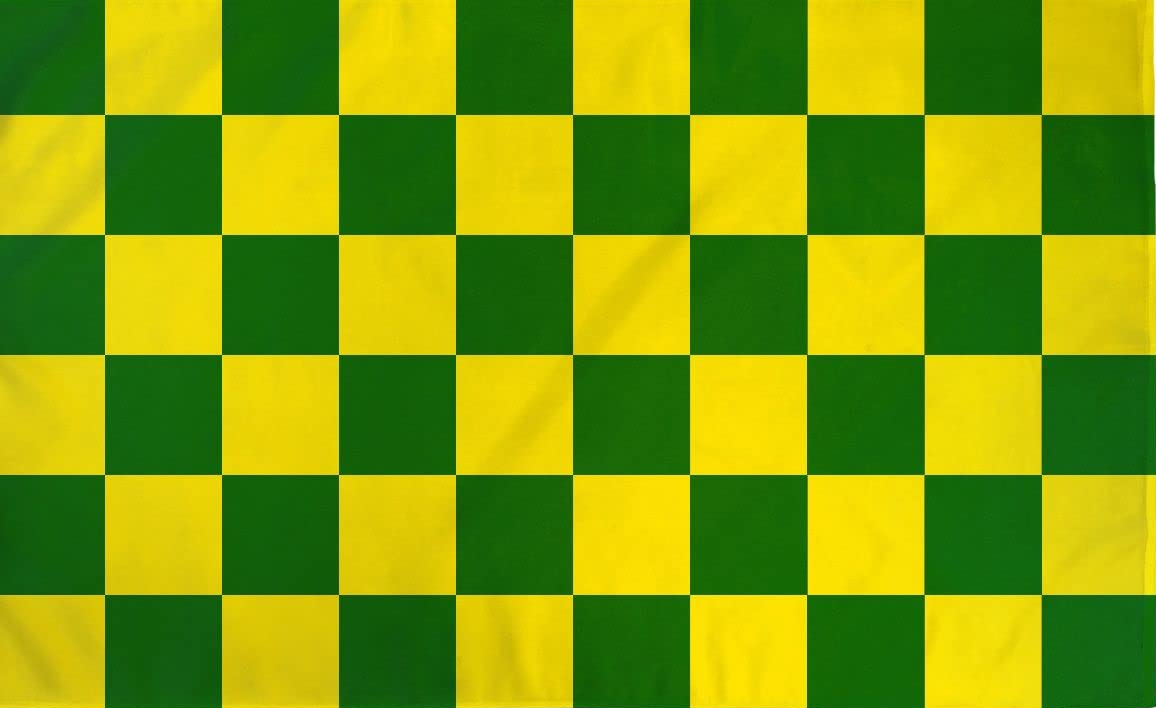
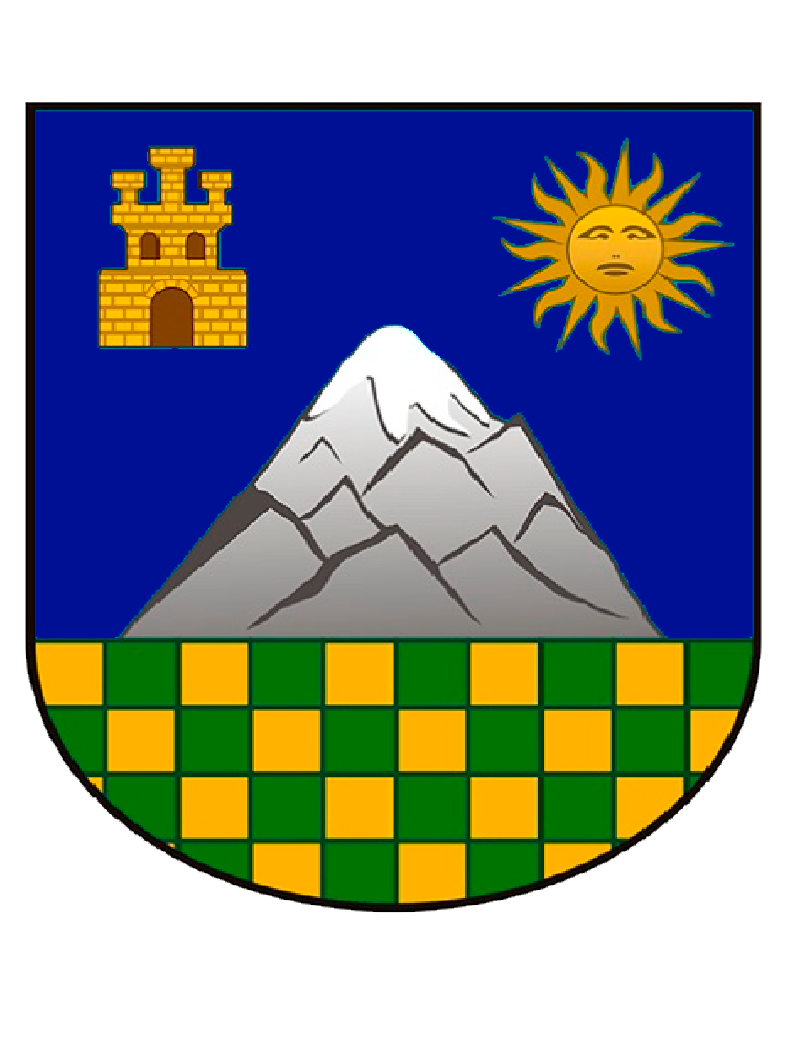
- Flag Coat of arms

- Location of Chilecito in Argentina
- Coordinates: 29°10′S 67°30′W
- Country: Argentina
- Province: La Rioja
- Department: Chilecito
- Founded: 1715

Government
  - Intendant: Rodrigo Brizuela y Doria (PJ)
- Elevation: 1,080 m (3,540 ft)

Population (2022)
  - Total: 58,798
- Demonym: chileciteño/a
- Time zone: UTC−3 (ART)
- CPA base: F5360
- Area code: 3825
- Climate: BWk

Chilecito (lit. Little Chile) is a city in the Argentine province of La Rioja, and head of the department of Chilecito.

== Overview and history ==
The city is located in the valley formed by the Sierras de Velazco to the east, and the Sierras de Famatina to the west. The city was founded in 1715 by Spanish colonizers. Chilecito still preserves the cable-car of La Mejicana mine built by Bleichert which is part of the city mining past that saw its peak at the end of the 19th century.

Chilecito is surrounded by an oasis of irrigation, which has been expanded by way of supplements from underground waters. A great part of agricultural land is used for the cultivation of vineyards because the most significant industrial activity is based in wine-cellars. Walnut and fruit trees are also cultivated and their product is locally processed.

By some accounts the locality got its name from a large number of Chilean artisan miners known as pirquineros who migrated to the area to work in the gold fields of Famatina.

The Argentine educator, lawyer, senator, governor and historian Joaquín V. González was raised in the vicinity of Chilecito. He also used to spend his vacation in a home that he built here in his later years. The property, which he called Samay Huasi (Quechua Samay Wasi, "rest house") was donated to the University of La Plata for use as an artists' retreat.

By the end of the 1990s, the university of Chilecito which was still part of the National University of La Rioja became the National University of Chilecito. This decision was highly criticized by different academic and political sectors, especially those concerning to the President of Argentina at the time, Carlos Menem.

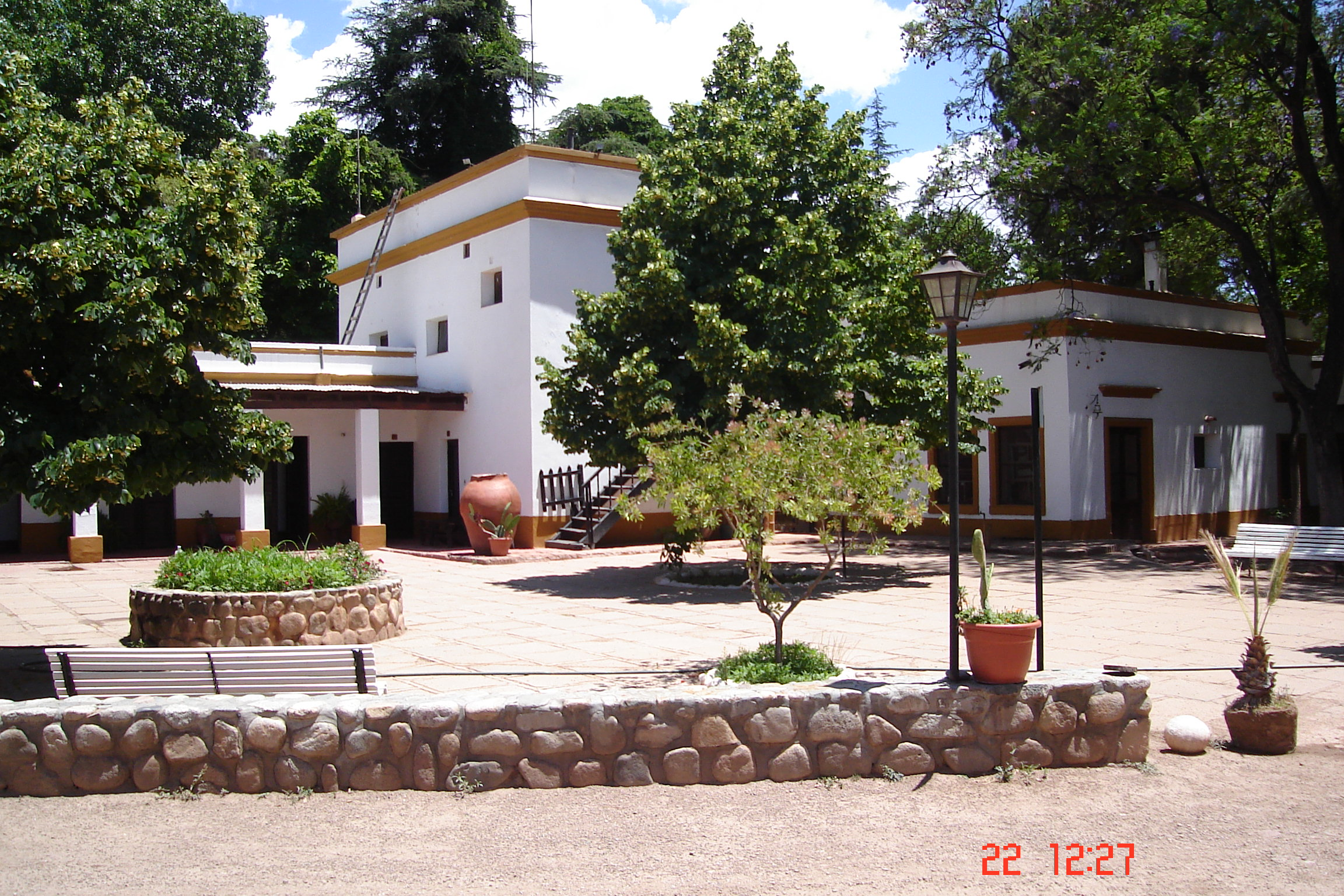
Samay Huasi, a historic property in Chilecito.

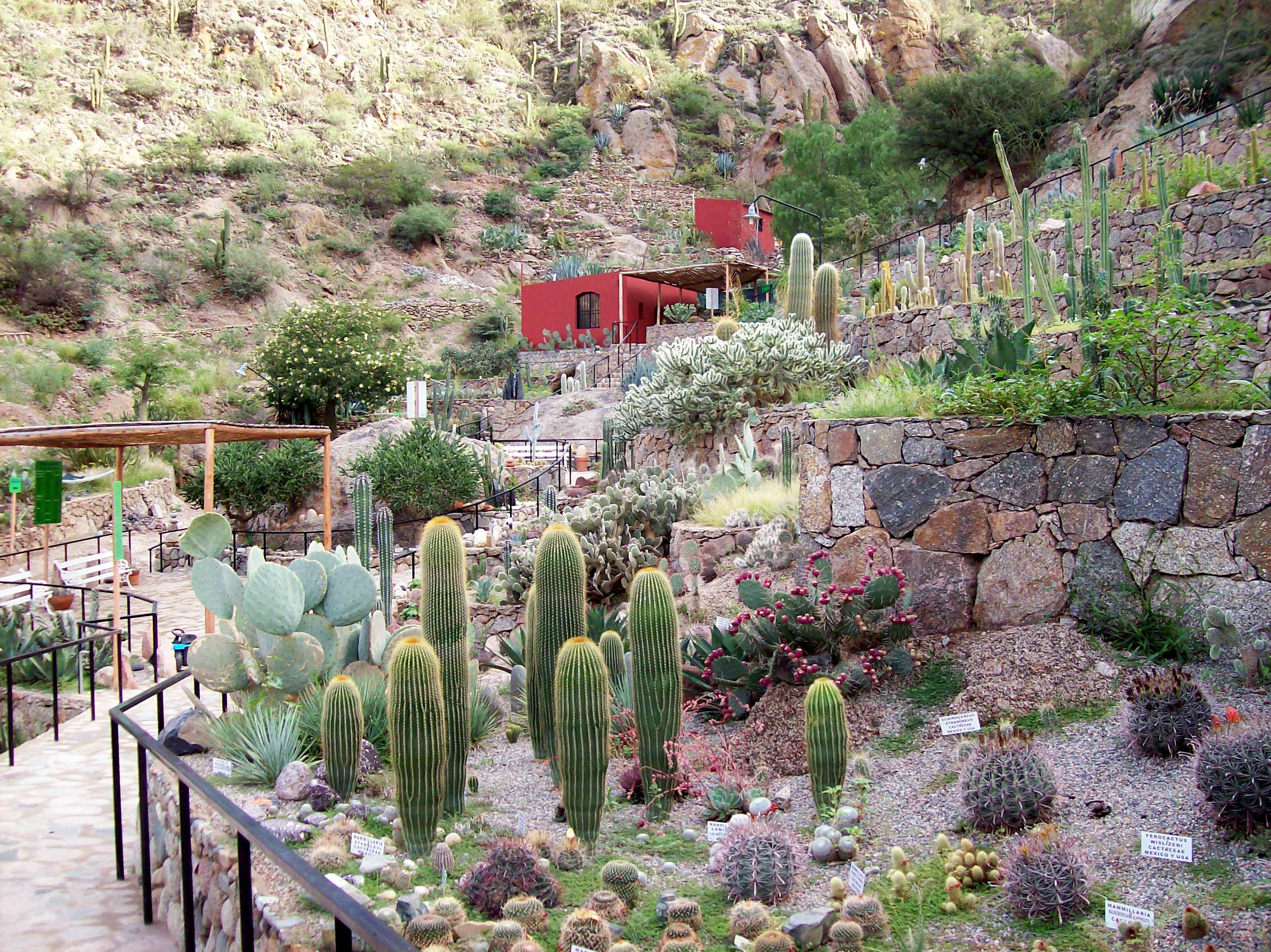
Chirau Mita Botanical Gardens.

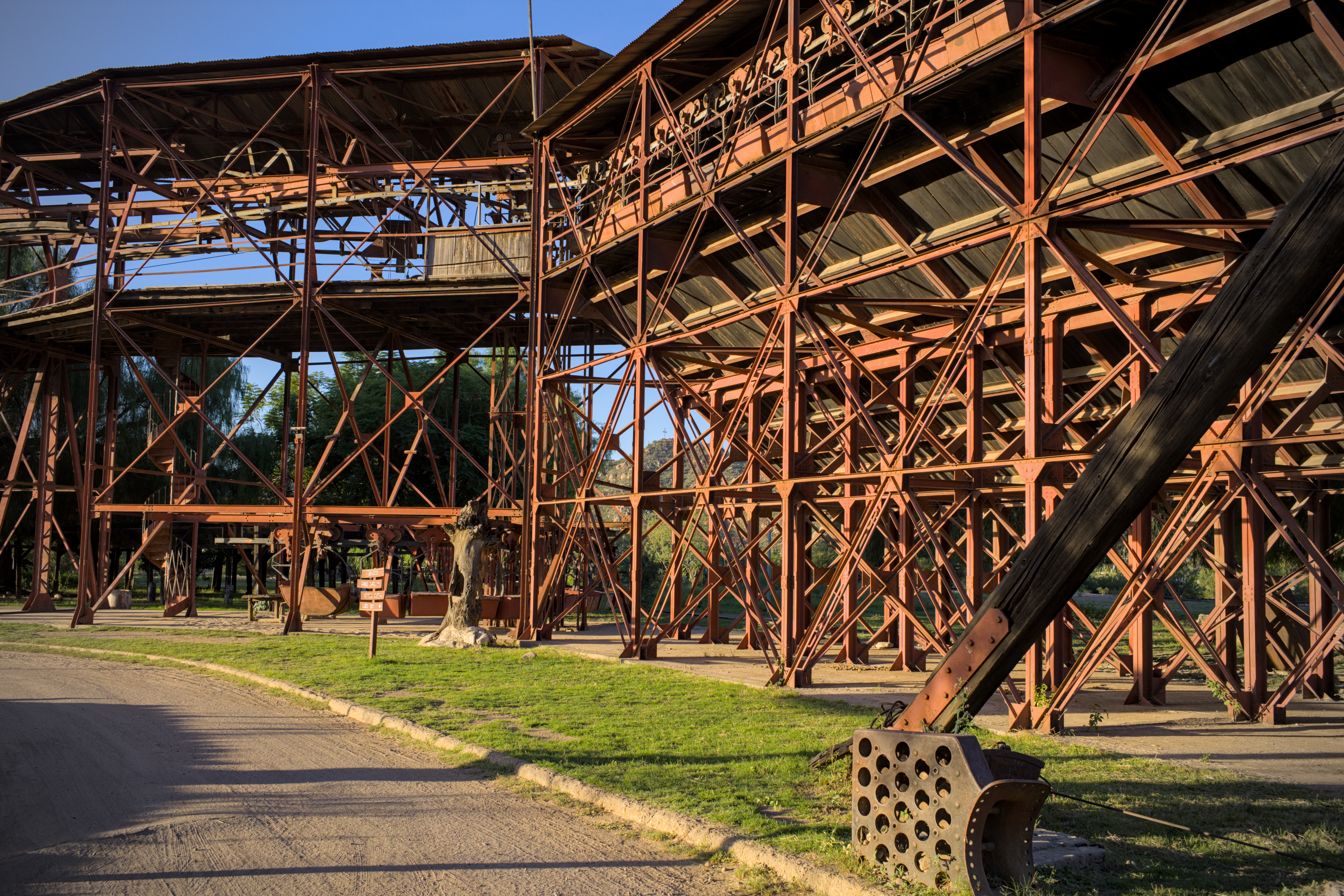
Station I of the aerial lift of the La Mejicana mine in Chilecito.

== Geography ==
=== Population ===
According to statistics, Chilecito has 58,798 inhabitants (data provided from the INDEC 2022 census). This data includes facts from the localities of Anguinán, Malligasta, San Miguel, Los Sarmientos and La Puntilla.

=== Climate ===
Climate data for Chilecito (1991–2000, extremes 1961–present)
Month	Jan	Feb	Mar	Apr	May	Jun	Jul	Aug	Sep	Oct	Nov	Dec	Year
Record high °C (°F)	43.1 (109.6)	42.0 (107.6)	40.5 (104.9)	38.5 (101.3)	38.2 (100.8)	35.5 (95.9)	35.3 (95.5)	38.5 (101.3)	40.0 (104.0)	41.5 (106.7)	43.7 (110.7)	44.3 (111.7)	44.3 (111.7)
Mean daily maximum °C (°F)	32.9 (91.2)	31.1 (88.0)	29.6 (85.3)	25.3 (77.5)	21.2 (70.2)	17.6 (63.7)	17.2 (63.0)	21.4 (70.5)	24.6 (76.3)	28.1 (82.6)	31.1 (88.0)	33.8 (92.8)	26.2 (79.2)
Daily mean °C (°F)	24.9 (76.8)	23.5 (74.3)	22.3 (72.1)	17.8 (64.0)	13.9 (57.0)	10.2 (50.4)	9.1 (48.4)	12.8 (55.0)	16.5 (61.7)	20.2 (68.4)	22.6 (72.7)	25.7 (78.3)	18.3 (64.9)
Mean daily minimum °C (°F)	18.7 (65.7)	16.9 (62.4)	16.3 (61.3)	11.1 (52.0)	7.1 (44.8)	2.5 (36.5)	0.6 (33.1)	3.6 (38.5)	7.3 (45.1)	11.9 (53.4)	15.5 (59.9)	18.4 (65.1)	10.9 (51.6)
Record low °C (°F)	9.3 (48.7)	8.5 (47.3)	2.4 (36.3)	0.4 (32.7)	−5.1 (22.8)	−7.7 (18.1)	−7.7 (18.1)	−6.9 (19.6)	−5.4 (22.3)	−2.0 (28.4)	1.3 (34.3)	6.8 (44.2)	−7.7 (18.1)
Average precipitation mm (inches)	51.1 (2.01)	35.5 (1.40)	16.4 (0.65)	7.4 (0.29)	5.2 (0.20)	1.7 (0.07)	2.4 (0.09)	2.4 (0.09)	4.4 (0.17)	6.1 (0.24)	7.9 (0.31)	23.7 (0.93)	162.5 (6.40)
Average precipitation days (≥ 0.1 mm)	4.3	4.6	2.6	1.8	0.8	0.9	1.0	0.5	1.3	1.3	1.4	3.8	23.5
Average snowy days	0.0	0.0	0.0	0.0	0.0	0.1	0.1	0.1	0.0	0.0	0.0	0.0	0.3
Average relative humidity (%)	58.4	60.7	64.3	64.7	65.8	67.2	63.3	55.7	53.4	51.7	52.3	53.2	59.6
Mean monthly sunshine hours	272.8	223.2	198.4	195.0	195.3	171.0	220.1	238.7	231.0	248.0	279.0	291.4	2,763.9
Percentage possible sunshine	64.3	60.4	53.0	57.9	59.6	56.6	68.4	69.9	64.4	62.6	68.8	67.8	62.5
Source: Servicio Meteorológico Nacional

== Notable people ==
- Gabriel Chade (born 1980), FIFA football assistant referee
- Joaquín V. González, known for his contributions and ideas that have benefited the town of Chilecito and its province, La Rioja
