= Woodeaton =

Village in Oxfordshire, England

Coordinates: 51.805°N 1.225°W

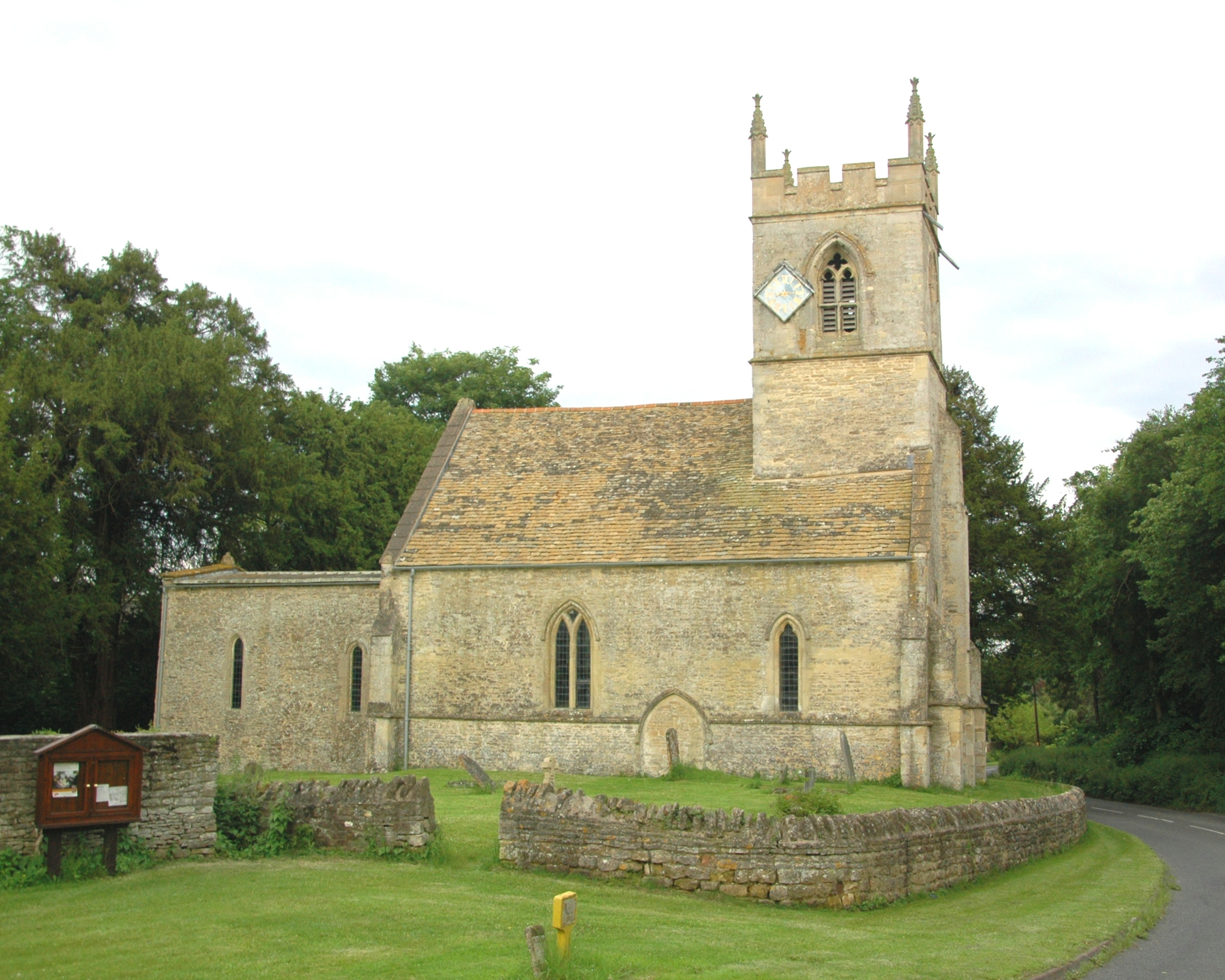
- Holy Rood parish church

- Location within Oxfordshire
- Population: 191 (2021 census, includes Elsfield)
- OS grid reference: SP5312
- Civil parish: Woodeaton
- District: South Oxfordshire
- Shire county: Oxfordshire
- Region: South East
- Country: England
- Sovereign state: United Kingdom
- Post town: Oxford
- Postcode district: OX3
- Dialling code: 01865
- Police: Thames Valley
- Fire: Oxfordshire
- Ambulance: South Central
- UK Parliament: Henley and Thame

Woodeaton or Wood Eaton is a village and civil parish about 4 miles (6.4 km) northeast of Oxford, England. It also has a special education school called Woodeaton Manor School.

== Archaeology ==
There was a Romano-Celtic temple north of where the parish church now stands, and probably a Romano-British settlement and shrine as well. The shrine was used successively by Roman pagans and Christians. A small square temple was built in the first century AD. This was replaced with a more substantial building that had moulded stonework and decorated plasterwork, and a rectangular perimeter wall was added that enclosed an area around the temple building. Numerous notable bronze artefacts have been discovered at and around the site and are now housed in the Ashmolean Museum in Oxford. A sixth-century Anglo-Saxon pendant has also been found at the site, but the reason for its presence at a Roman site is not clear.

== Manor ==
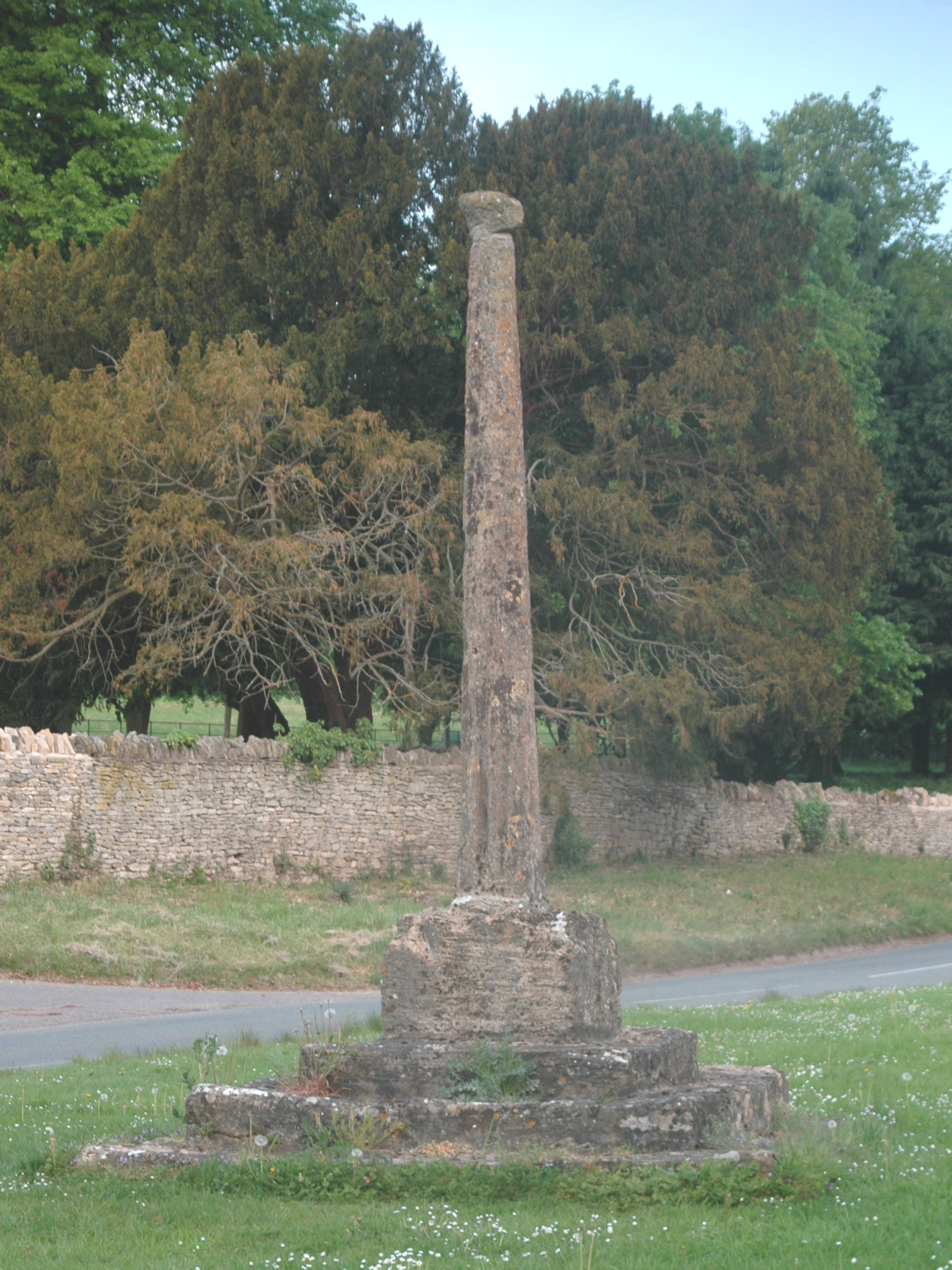
13th-century preaching cross on the village green

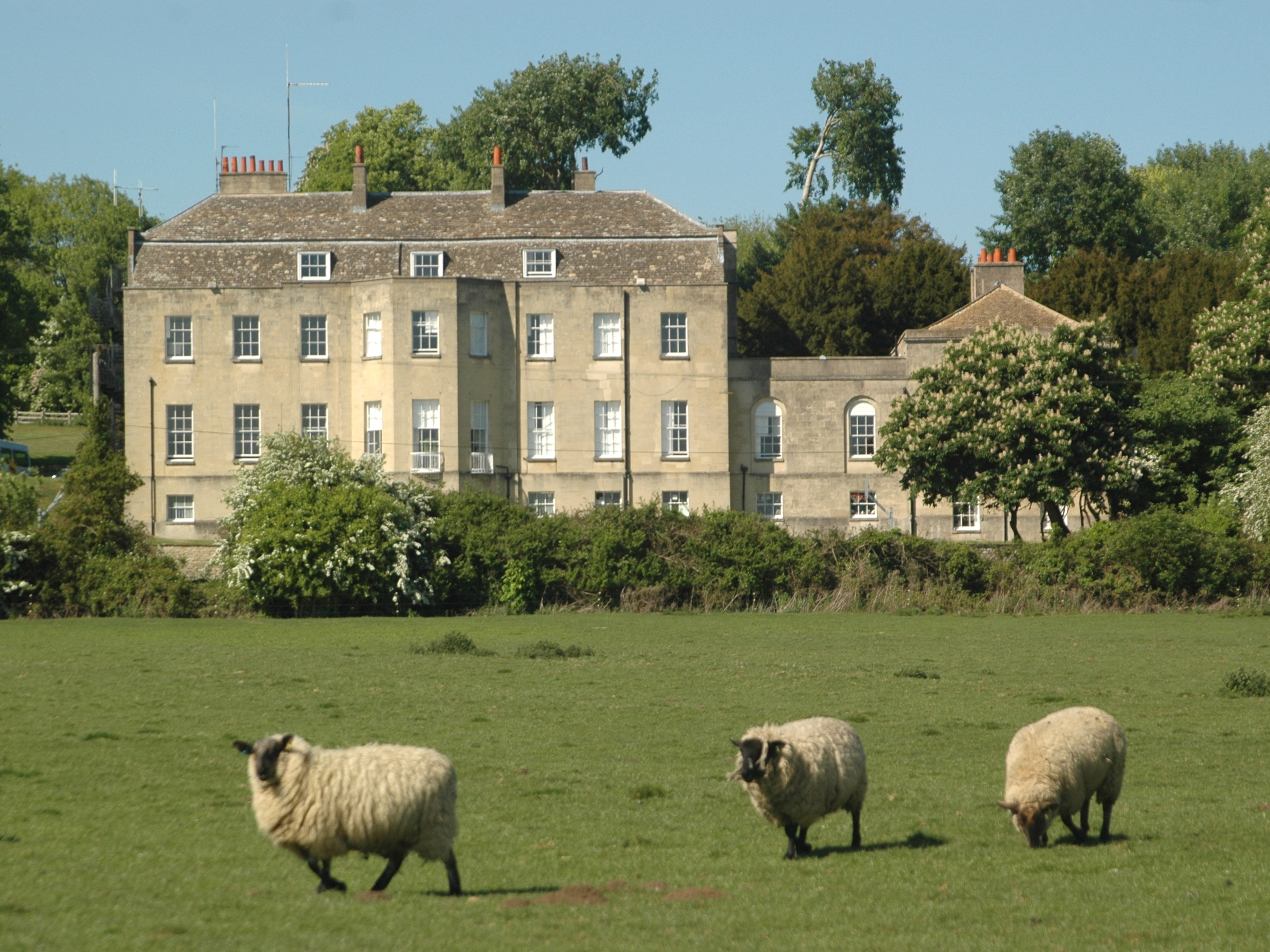
Woodeaton Manor House, built 1775, now Woodeaton Manor School

The Old English toponym was originally Eatun. By the 12th century it had become Wood Eaton, perhaps to distinguish it from Water Eaton just over 1 mile (1.6 km) to the west. The Domesday Book records that by 1086 the Norman nobleman Roger d'Ivry held the manor of Eaton. In about 1160 Helewis Avenel gave a virgate of land at Woodeaton to Eynsham Abbey. The Abbey had a grange and manor court house in Woodeaton, recorded in 1366, but no trace remains. The Manor remained with the abbey until the Dissolution of the Monasteries in 1538.

At the centre of the village, by the village green, are the base and shaft of a 13th-century stone cross. The cross is both a scheduled monument and a Grade I listed building. After the Dissolution of the Monasteries in 1536 the manor of Woodeaton was bought and sold by two speculators in succession. Then in 1544 Richard Taverner (1505–75), the translator of Taverner's Bible, bought the manor. He retired to the village and had a manor house built in the 1550s, and he is buried in Holy Rood churchyard. Woodeaton remained in the Taverner family until 1604. The manor then passed through various hands until it was bought by the Nourse family from Middleton Keynes, Buckinghamshire sometime between 1623 and 1625. In 1774 John Nourse, the last of the male line, died and left the manor to his daughter Elizabeth Weyland, wife of John Weyland.

In 1775 Weyland had the old manor house demolished and the present Woodeaton Manor built. The new house has a modest exterior but in 1791 the architect Sir John Soane enhanced its main rooms with marble chimneypieces, added an Ionic porch of Coade stone, a service wing and an ornate main hall. The manor remained with the family until 1912 when Captain Mark Weyland sold the house and part of the land. Christ Church, Oxford now owns most of the former manor lands. Since 1950 Woodeaton Manor House has been an Oxfordshire County Council school for children with special educational needs. The current headteacher of the school is Abi Allum. The house is a Grade II* listed building.

== Parish church ==
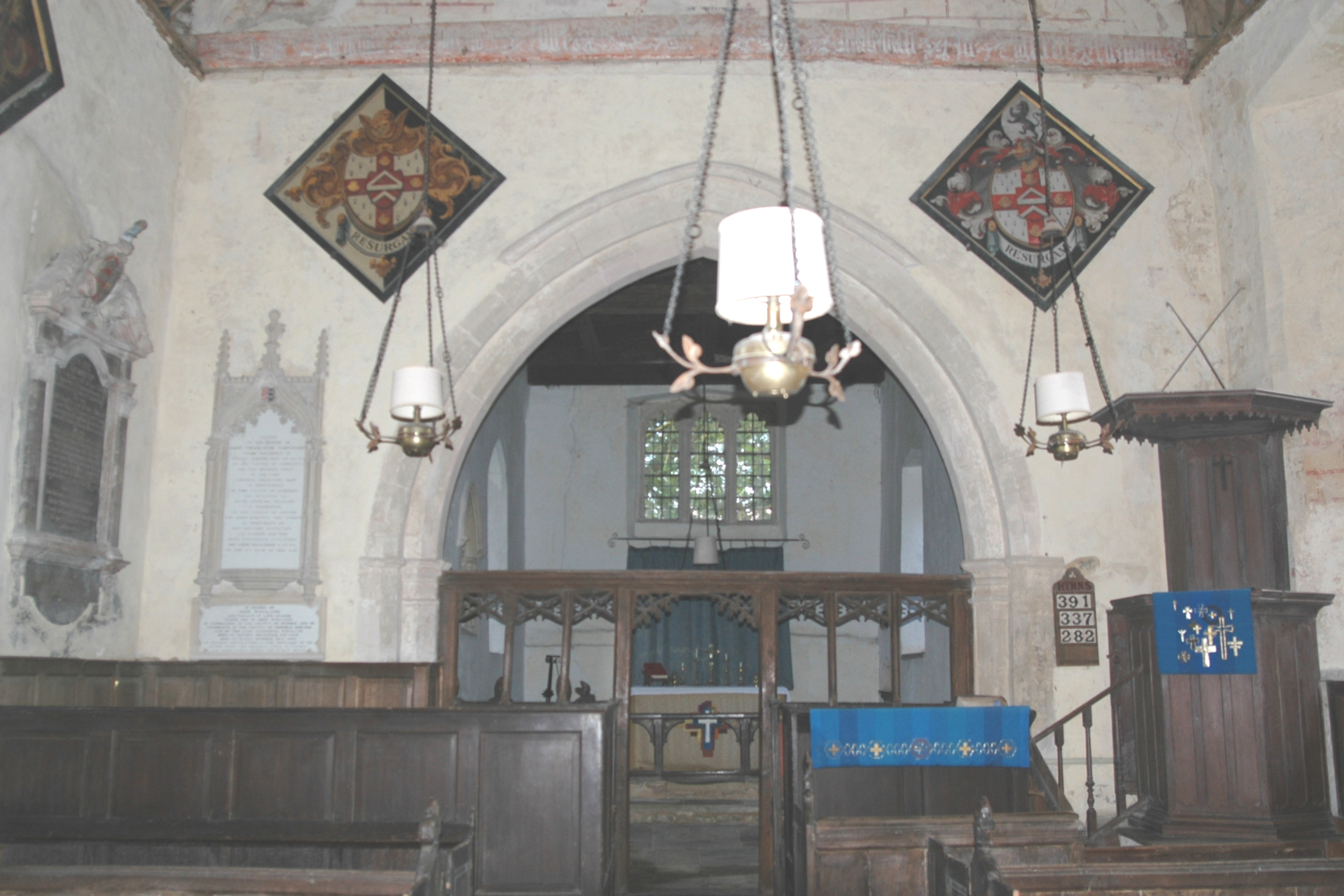
Holy Rood: looking east to the 13th-century chancel arch

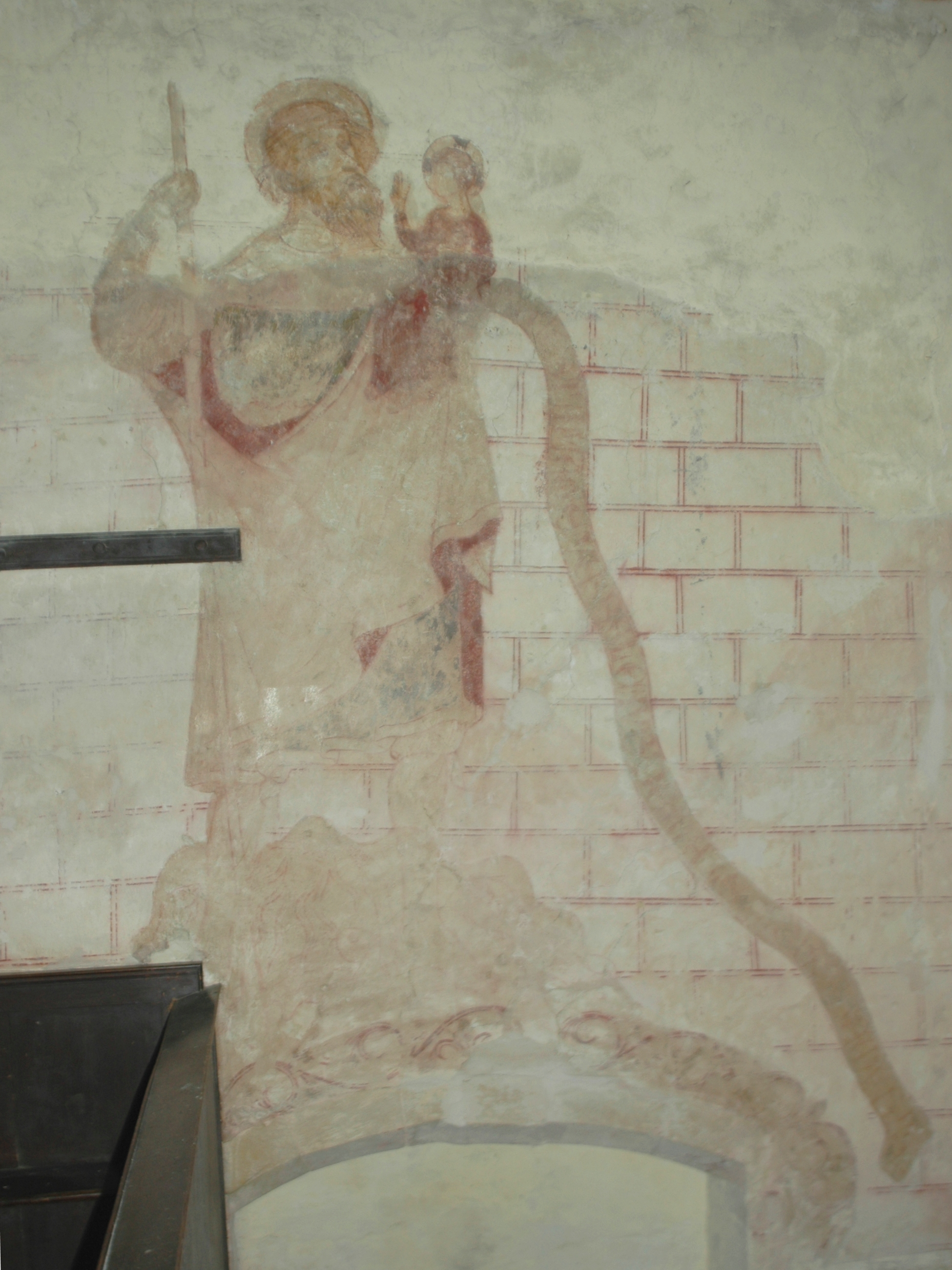
Holy Rood: 14th-century wall painting of St Christopher

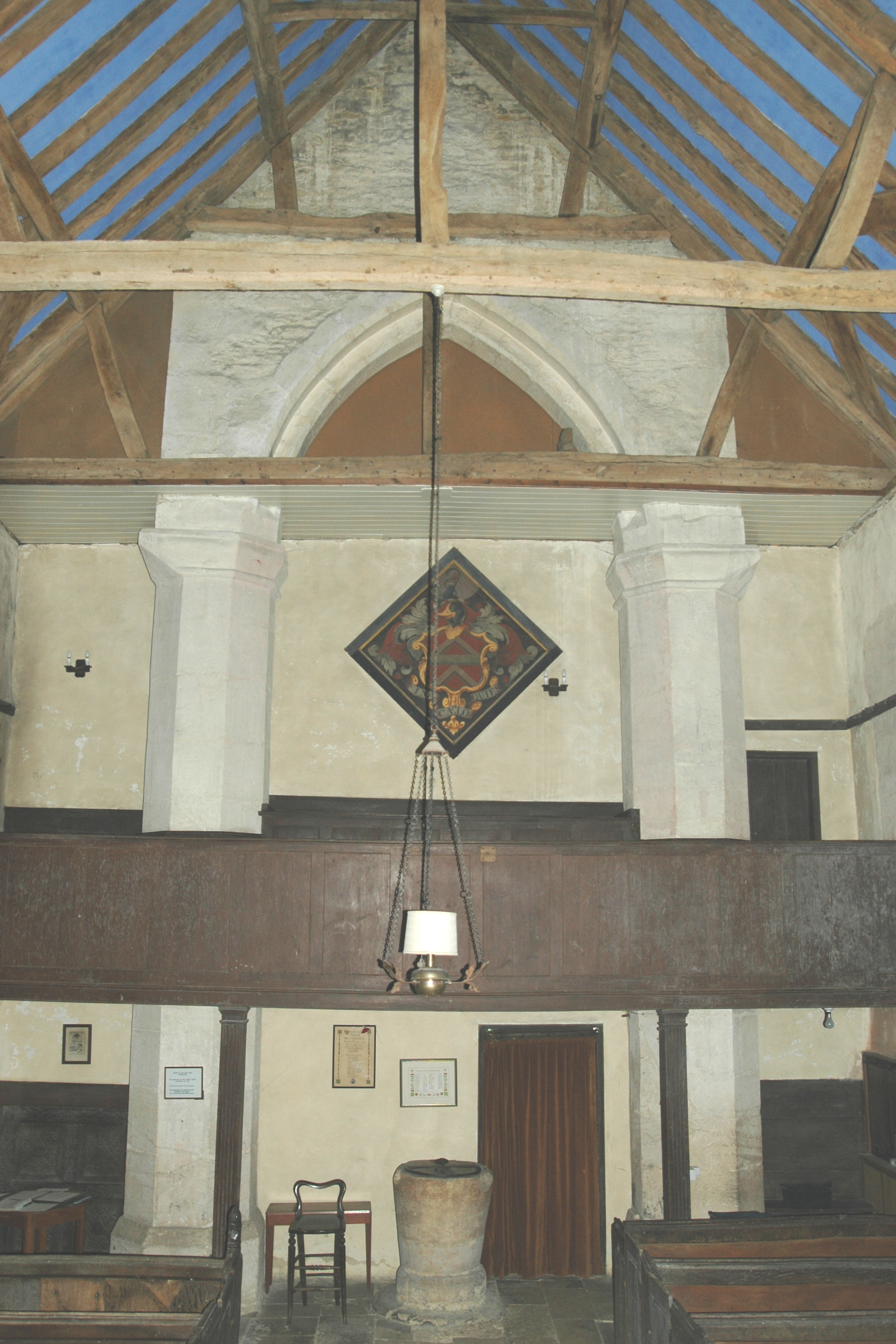
Holy Rood: looking west to the tower arch and west gallery

Woodeaton has had a parish church since the early or middle part of the 11th century, when a Saxon timber one was built. This was destroyed by fire by about 1080 at the latest. The present Church of England parish church of the Holy Rood originates from an early Norman stone church that was built between 1070 and 1120 to replace the destroyed Saxon one. It was a small building, dominated by a western tower. The original Norman layout is not entirely certain: there may have been a small nave east of the tower and an even smaller chancel beyond that, or the tower may have been a "tower-nave" with only a chancel to the east of it. In about 1180–1220 a late Norman south aisle and possible south chapel were added and in about 1200–50 the chancel was extended. An Early English Gothic doorway in the south wall of the chancel is of a style that suggests a date of 1200–30.

Several Early English lancet windows in the chancel also date from this period. The nave was rebuilt in about 1250–1300. Later in the Middle Ages, the east and south walls of the chancel were rebuilt and were given late Perpendicular Gothic windows. The eastern window in the south wall of the nave was also revised with Perpendicular tracery. The Perpendicular Gothic belltower was added in either the 14th or 15th century. Unusually the tower is built on columns erected inside the nave. This seems to be because the ground falls away west of the church to an extent that precluded building a tower conventionally to the west of the nave. The south porch was built in the 18th century. In 2010 the church roof was restored, re-using many of the original Stonesfield slates. Holy Rood church is a Grade I listed building.

Holy Rood is now part of the Church of England Benefice of the Ray Valley.

=== Bells and clock ===
The tower has a ring of five bells, all of which were cast by Henry II Bagley of Chacombe, Northamptonshire in 1680. Holy Rood also has a Sanctus bell cast by Richard Keene of Burford in 1674. The tower has a turret clock similar to that at St Nicholas' Church, Islip, except that the iron bars of its frame are nutted together rather than wedged. It may have been made in about 1700. In the 1960s Dr. C.F.C. Beeson described it as "long disused, rusted".

=== Furnishings and internal decoration ===
In the 14th century a large image of Saint Christopher was painted on the north wall inside the nave. Restoration work in 2010 exposed remnants of an early 14th-century crucifixion scene above the rood beam over the chancel arch. Both the chancel and the nave have pews with 15th-century carved wooden bench ends. The wooden screen in the chancel arch and some of the nave seating was added late in the 15th or early in the 16th century. Reportedly there was a rood tympanum but this had been removed before 1846. In the 18th century the wooden pulpit, tester and reading desk were added, along with the wooden panelling and west gallery. Some timbers from the chancel screen tympanum seem to have been re-used in the 18th-century reading desk and pew floors. There is also one box pew at the front of the nave, presumably for the manorial family.

== Pioneer balloon flight ==
James Sadler, the first English balloonist, landed near the village after his first ascent from Christ Church Meadow in Oxford on 4 October 1784. He had flown a distance of about 6 miles (10 km) and reached a height of about 3,600 feet (1,100 m).

== Amenities ==
Woodeaton is a small village with no shop or public house. Woodeaton Wood is about 0.5 miles (800 m) southeast of the village, on the southwest side of Drun's Hill.

== Sources and further reading ==
- Anonymous (2010). Church of the Holy Rood Woodeaton Roof Project (two-page leaflet in church). Woodeaton: Holy Rood, Woodeaton Parochial Church Council.
- Bagnall Smith, Jean (1998). "The Romano-Celtic Temple at Woodeaton". Oxoniensia. LXIII. Oxfordshire Architectural and Historical Society: 147–185.
- Beeson, C.F.C. (1989) [1962]. Simcock, A.V. (ed.). Clockmaking in Oxfordshire 1400–1850 (3rd ed.). Oxford: Museum of the History of Science. p. 174. ISBN 0-903364-06-9.
- Blair, John (1999). "Archaeological Discoveries at Woodeaton Church". Oxoniensia. LXIII. Oxfordshire Architectural and Historical Society: 221–237.
- Goodchild, Richard; Kirk, Joan R. (1954). "More Votive Finds from Woodeaton, Oxfordshire". Oxoniensia. XIX. Oxford Architectural and Historical Society: 15–40.
- Jope, E.M. (1957). "A Fragment of Chain-Mail from the Romano-British Temple Site at Woodeaton". Oxoniensia. XXII. Oxford Architectural and Historical Society: 106–107.
- Jope, E.M; Hughes, D. (1940). "Blue Pigment of Roman Date from Woodeaton, Oxon". Oxoniensia. V. Oxford Architectural and Historical Society: 167.
- Kirk, Joan R. (1949). "Bronzes from Woodeaton, Oxon". Oxoniensia. XIV. Oxford Architectural and Historical Society: 1–45.
- Lobel, Mary D, ed. (1957). A History of the County of Oxford: Volume 5: Bullingdon Hundred. Victoria County History. pp. 309–317.
- Sherwood, Jennifer; Pevsner, Nikolaus (1974). Oxfordshire. The Buildings of England. Harmondsworth: Penguin Books. pp. 853–854. ISBN 0-14-071045-0.
