= Frank S. Tavenner Jr. =

American judge

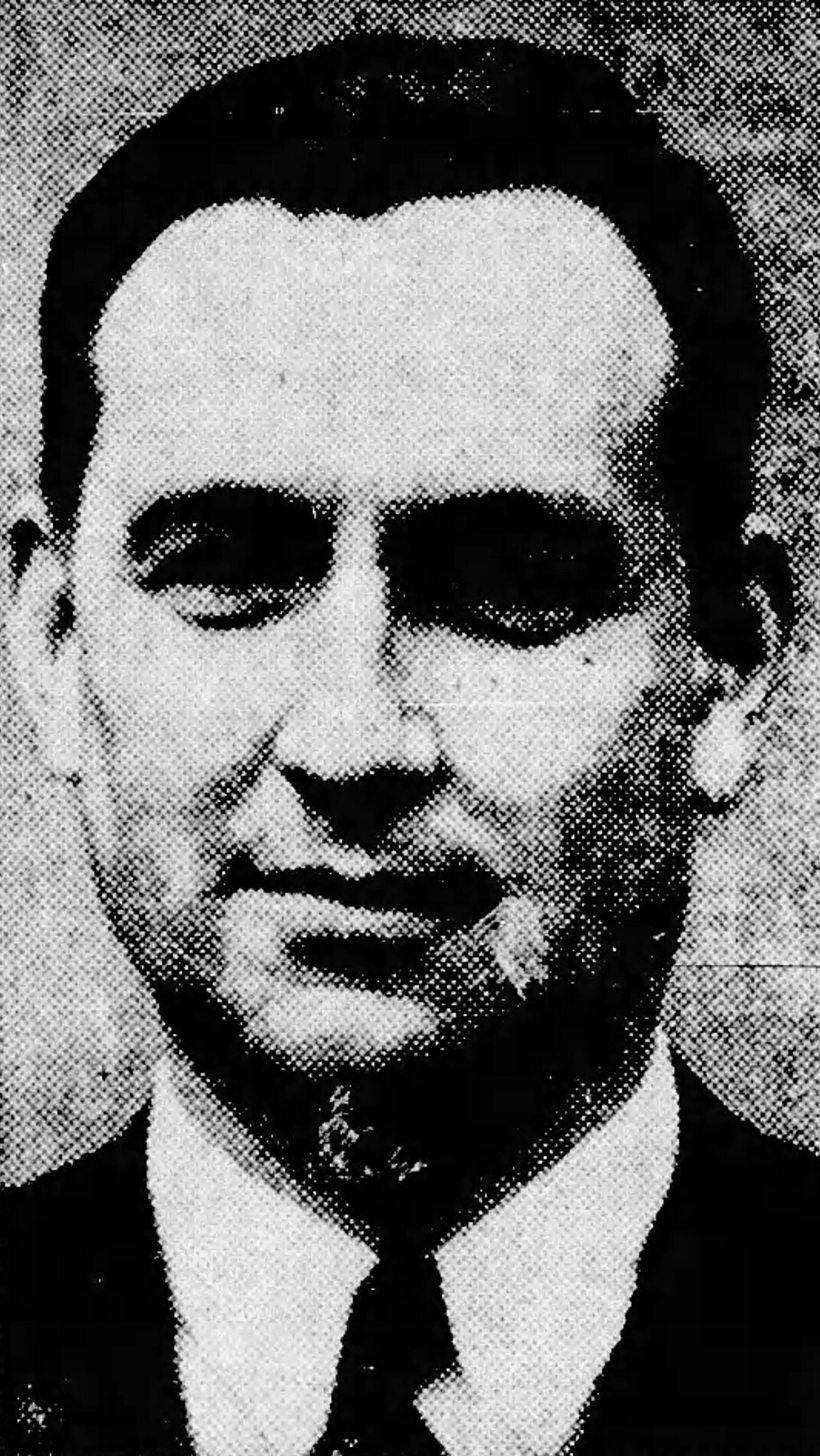
- Tavenner c. 1946

United States Attorney for the Western District of Virginia
- In office 1940–1948
- President: Franklin D. Roosevelt; Harry S. Truman
- Preceded by: Joseph H. Chitwood
- Succeeded by: Howard C. Gilmer Jr.

Personal details
- Born: Frank Stacy Tavenner Jr. July 12, 1895 Woodstock, Virginia, U.S.
- Died: October 21, 1964 (aged 69) Woodstock, Virginia, U.S.
- Parent: Frank S. Tavenner (father)
- Education: Roanoke College (AB); Princeton University (AM); University of Virginia (LLB)
- Occupation: Lawyer
- Known for: Counsel for the House Un-American Activities Committee

Military service
- Branch/service: United States Army
- Battles/wars: World War I

Frank Stacy Tavenner Jr. (July 12, 1895 – October 21, 1964) was an American lawyer who was United States Attorney for the Western District of Virginia, along with other high-profile government legal positions, particularly as chief counsel to the House Un-American Activities Committee (HUAC).

== Background ==
Frank Stacy Tavenner Jr. was born in Woodstock, Virginia on July 12, 1895. His father, F. S. Tavenner Sr., was a lawyer, member of the Senate of Virginia, and judge. The elder Tavenner held the same Senate seat later occupied by Harry Byrd Sr. and Harry Byrd Jr. He earned an A.B. degree at Roanoke College in 1916. He served in World War I as an Army lieutenant. He received an A.M. at Princeton University in 1917 and an LL.B at the University of Virginia Law School in 1927.

== Career ==
Shortly after graduating, Tavenner began to practice law in his home town.

In 1931, he became Assistant U.S. Attorney in Roanoke, Virginia. In 1933, Tavenner was appointed assistant U.S. attorney in the Western District of Virginia. In 1938, he along with A.C. Buchanan were the choices of Virginia Senators Carter Glass and Harry Byrd Sr. to a vacancy on the United States District Court for the Western District of Virginia, to which Franklin D. Roosevelt named instead Floyd H. Roberts. In 1940, Tavenner became U.S. attorney for the Western District of Virginia, nominated by Roosevelt.

Following World War II, he was assigned by the Department of the Army to be Counsel under Joseph B. Keenan and later Acting Chief of Counsel of the International Prosecution Section for the International Military Tribunal for the Far East from late 1945 to the end of the trial in 1948.

From May 1949 until the mid-1950s, Tavenner served as Chief Counsel for the House Un-American Activities Committee, where he replaced Robert E. Stripling. During this period, HUAC conducted more than 100 hearings that resulted in 35 volumes and 11 reports. Among its documents was a first-ever "Guide to Subversive Organizations and Publications."

== Death ==
Tavenner died of a heart attack, aged 69, on October 21, 1964, in Woodstock, Virginia, and was buried in the Massanutten Cemetery in Woodstock.

== Legacy ==
Dartmouth College law professor Robert K. Carr wrote of Tavenner that in him HUAC had "obtained perhaps the best qualified and most dispassionate assistant it ever had."
