= Taverner =

Taverner may refer to:

- someone who owns a tavern
- Taverner (surname)
- Taverner (opera), a 1972 opera by Peter Maxwell Davies
- Edwin Munroe Bacon (1844–1916), American writer who used the pseudonym Taverner
- William the Taverner (fl. 1320), English MP for Lichfield

== See also ==
- Tavernier (disambiguation)
