= Joaquín V. González =

Argentine educator, political scientist, writer, magistrate and politician

Joaquín Víctor González
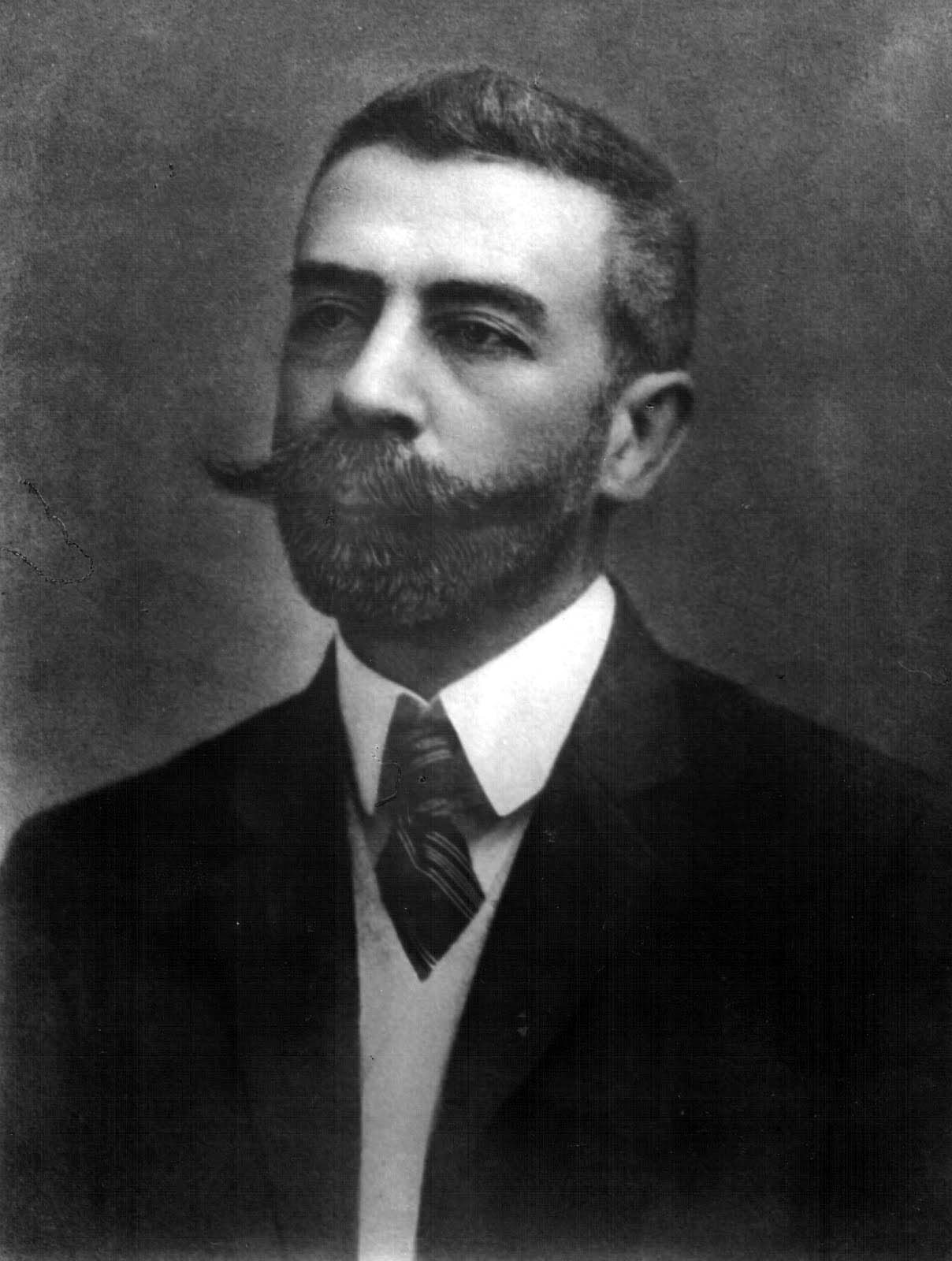

National Senator
- In office 1916–1923
- Constituency: La Rioja

Rector of the University of La Plata
- In office 1906–1918
- Preceded by: Dardo Rocha
- Succeeded by: Rodolfo Rivarola

Minister of Justice and Public Instruction
- In office 1901 – 1906
- President: Julio Roca; Manuel Quintana
- Preceded by: Juan Serú
- Succeeded by: Federico Pinedo

Governor of La Rioja Province
- In office June 24, 1889 – October 8, 1891
- Preceded by: Antonio García
- Succeeded by: Dermidio Carreño

Personal details
- Born: March 6, 1863 Nonogasta, La Rioja Province, Argentina
- Died: December 21, 1923 (aged 60) Buenos Aires
- Party: National Autonomist Party
- Spouse: Amalia Luna Olmos
- Occupation: Journalist and academic

Joaquín Víctor González (March 6, 1863 – December 21, 1923) was an Argentine educator, political scientist, writer, magistrate, and politician.

== Biography ==
=== Early life ===
González was born in Nonogasta, a rural community near Chilecito, La Rioja Province, to Zoraida Dávila and Joaquín González. He enrolled at the Colegio de Monserrat, a college preparatory school in Córdoba, and in 1881 entered the labor force as a journalist. He worked for a number of local journals in subsequent years, including El Interior, El Progreso, and La Revista de Córdoba, and taught History, Geography, and French language at the local normal school. He became an active Freemason.

=== Legal and political work ===
González earned a juris doctor at the University of Córdoba in 1886, and returned to La Rioja Province, for which he served as counsel in a territorial dispute with Córdoba Province. Later that year, he was elected to the Lower House of Congress, a post to which he would be re-elected three times, serving until 1901.

As Congressman, he was appointed to the Commission for Constitutional Reform in 1887, and subsequently drafted the Provincial Constitution of La Rioja. He published his first work, La Revolución de la Independencia Argentina, and joined La Prensa, at the time one of the leading news dailies of Buenos Aires.

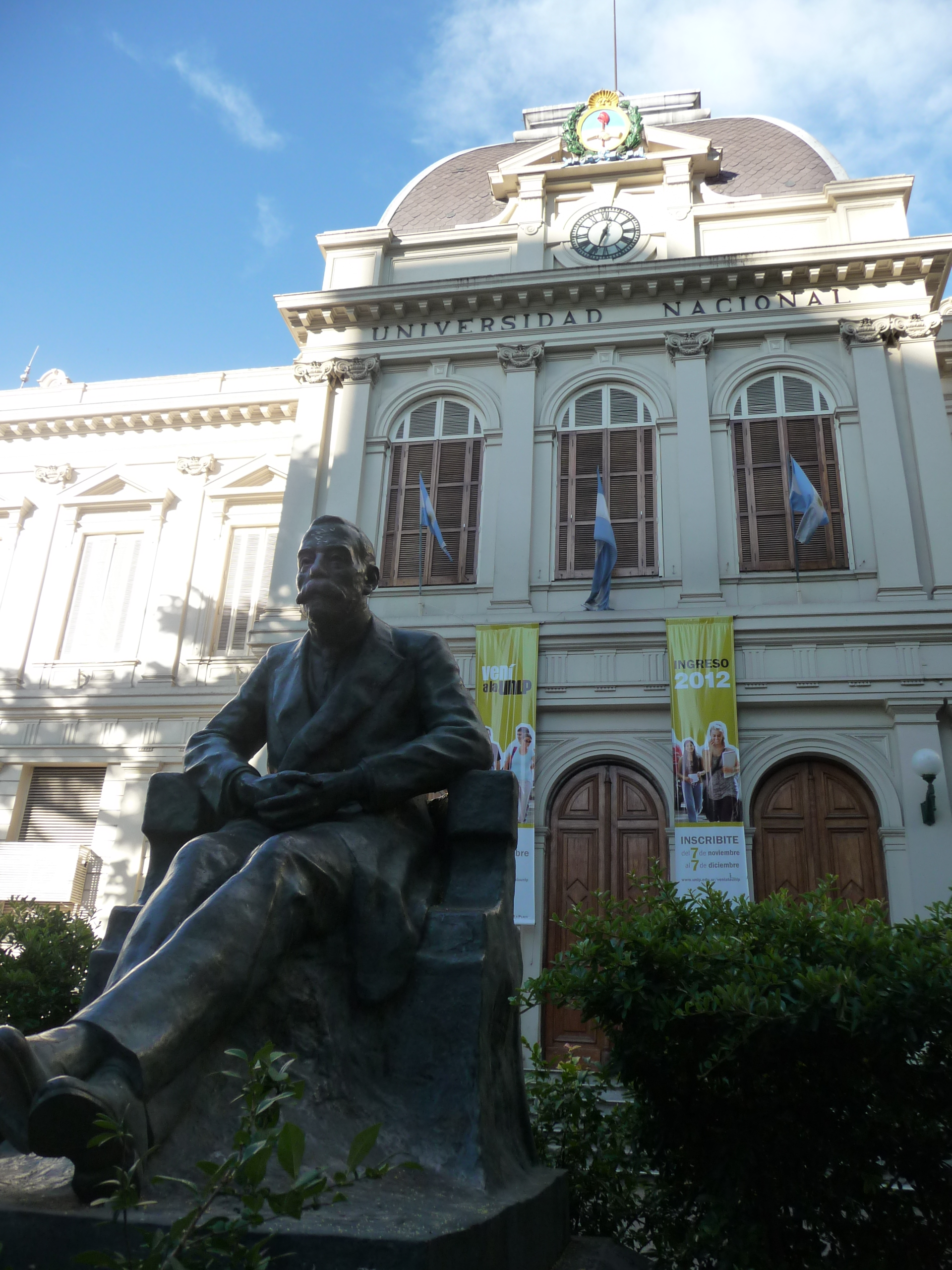
A monument to González stands in front of the University of La Plata administrative building.

He taught Mining Law at the University of Buenos Aires, and in 1889 married the former Amalia Luna Olmos; they had five children. He was elected Governor of La Rioja that year, and during his tenure, wrote La Tradición nacional (1891), a study of regionalisms and their basis in geography and history. Returning to Buenos Aires, he was made a tenured professor of Mining Law, a member of the board of the University of Buenos Aires School of Philosophy and Letters, and, in 1896, a member of the National Educational Council.

President Julio Roca appointed González Minister of Internal Affairs in 1901. Occupying at times the posts of Minister of Justice, Government and Foreign Relations in a caretaker capacity, González nonetheless lent his academic expertise to numerous symposia on legal theory, as in the 1902 seminar, El ideal de la Justicia y la vida contemporánea. As Home Secretary, he decentralized the nation's voting precinct system, by which he arguably made possible the election of a number of candidates opposed by the ruling party, notably Socialist candidate Alfredo Palacios, who in 1904 was elected the nation's (and Latin America's) first Socialist congressman.

González himself was politically conservative, however, and when asked for his opinion on the political debate of the day (the granting of universal suffrage), he bluntly replied that it would be "the glory of universal ignorance!" He continued to write, and published Mis montañas (My Mountains), an ode to the Talampaya landscape of his childhood, in 1903.

President Manuel Quintana appointed him Minister of Justice and Education in 1904, during which term González founded the Seminario Pedagógico, a teacher training school later known as the Instituto Nacional del Profesorado Secundario; staffed mainly with German instructors, the institution was ultimately renamed in González's honor. He re-chartered the National University of La Plata upon its nationalization in 1905, and the following year was appointed its president; among the departments he incorporated into the university was its affiliated college preparatory school, the Rafael Hernández National College, and he donated his extensive library, as well as Samay Huasi, his Chilecito vacation residence, to the university, as well.

=== Later life and academic work ===
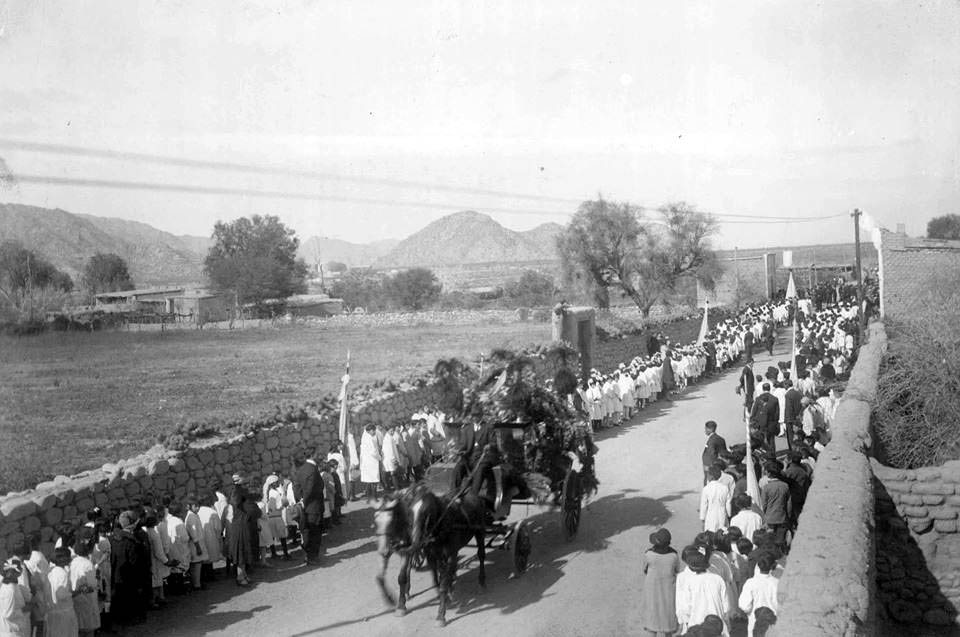
Funeral of González in Chilecito, La Rioja.

González was admitted into the Real Academia Española, the Royal authority on the Spanish language, in 1906, and was elected to the Argentine Senate in 1916 (while still president of the university). Retiring from the latter in 1918, he returned to the University of Buenos Aires, where he taught Constitutional Law, Public Law, and a course in the history of Foreign relations of Argentina. He contributed regularly to La Nación as a columnist, and translated Rabindranath Tagore's One Hundred Poems of Kabir. He joined the International Law Association in 1919, and advocated on behalf of the League of Nations, as well as U.S. President Woodrow Wilson's efforts towards its ratification by a recalcitrant U.S. Senate. His most controversial work, Patria y democracia (Fatherland and Democracy), was published in 1920, and delved into regional and political tensions in Argentina. González's efforts on behalf of the League of Nations helped lead to his nomination to the International Court of Justice at The Hague, becoming a member in 1921.

González died in Buenos Aires in 1923; he was 60. Fábulas nativas, a work of cultural anthropology, was published posthumously in 1924, and González left a bibliography of over a thousand works, including fifty books on a variety of academic subjects.

== Bibliography ==
- Biblioteca Pública Digital (educ.ar)
- Crispiani, Alejandro. La "universidad nueva" de Joaquín V. González y el proyecto de 1905.
- Historical Dictionary of Argentina. London: Scarecrow Press, 1978.
