= John Tavener (disambiguation) =

John Tavener (1944–2013) was an English composer.

John Tavener may also refer to:

- John Tavener (American football) (1921–1993), American football player
- John Tavener (baseball) (1897–1969), American baseball player, commonly known as Jackie Tavener

== See also ==
- Tavener (surname)
- John Taverner (disambiguation)
