= Roger Taverner =

English administrator and Member of Parliament

Roger Taverner (Abt.1507-1582) of Upminster, Essex was an English administrator and Member of Parliament for Newport, Cornwall.

== Life ==
Taverner was the eldest of Richard Taverner's younger brothers. He was a surveyor and writer, said by Anthony Wood in Athenae Oxonienses to have studied at Cambridge but not graduated, though university records do not confirm this.

Probably in the 1540s he became deputy to Sir Francis Jobson as surveyor for the Court of Augmentations, and later he was employed (also as deputy surveyor) by the exchequer until 1573 (we have surviving various reports by him on crown woods, in British Library, Lansdowne MSS. 43, 56, 62). He was elected to Parliament in 1555 as a member for Newport-juxta-Launceston, Cornwall (possibly at Jobson's instigation). He was also a writer of tracts on economic issues, such as 'Remedies ... of derth of victualles' (Corpus Christi College, Cambridge, MS 376 – dedicated to Queen Elizabeth), a similar work sent to her two years previously (mentioned in the previous work's dedication), and – unprinted, but more influential – his 'Arte of surveyinge' of 1565.

With his wife—a member of the Hulcote family—he had three sons, one of whom, John, Wood reports became a surveyor.
