= Howard C. Gilmer Jr. =

American lawyer (1906–1975)

United States Attorney for the Western District of Virginia
- In office 1948–1953
- Acting; 1946–1948
- President: Harry S. Truman
- Preceded by: Frank S. Tavenner Jr.
- Succeeded by: John Strickler

Personal details
- Born: Howard Cecil Gilmer Jr. December 27, 1906; Pulaski, Virginia, U.S.
- Died: November 1, 1975 (aged 68); Pulaski, Virginia, U.S.
- Spouse: Mary Berkeley Cosby (m. 1931)
- Children: 3
- Education: Hampden–Sydney College; University of Virginia
- Occupation: Lawyer

Howard Cecil Gilmer Jr. (December 27, 1906 – November 1, 1975) was an American lawyer. He served as president of the Virginia State Bar Association (now the Virginia Bar Association) from 1944 to 1946. In 1948, was appointed by Harry S. Truman as United States Attorney for the Western District of Virginia, after two years as acting United States Attorney; he left office in 1953.

Non-profit organization positions
Preceded by Christopher B. Garnett	President of the Virginia State Bar Association; 1944–1946	Succeeded by Thomas B. Gay
Legal offices
Preceded by Frank S. Tavenner Jr.	United States Attorney for the Western District of Virginia; 1946–1953	Succeeded by John Strickler
