= Mount Sterling, Muskingum County, Ohio =

Unincorporated community in Ohio, U.S.

Coordinates: 39°57′23″N 82°09′00″W

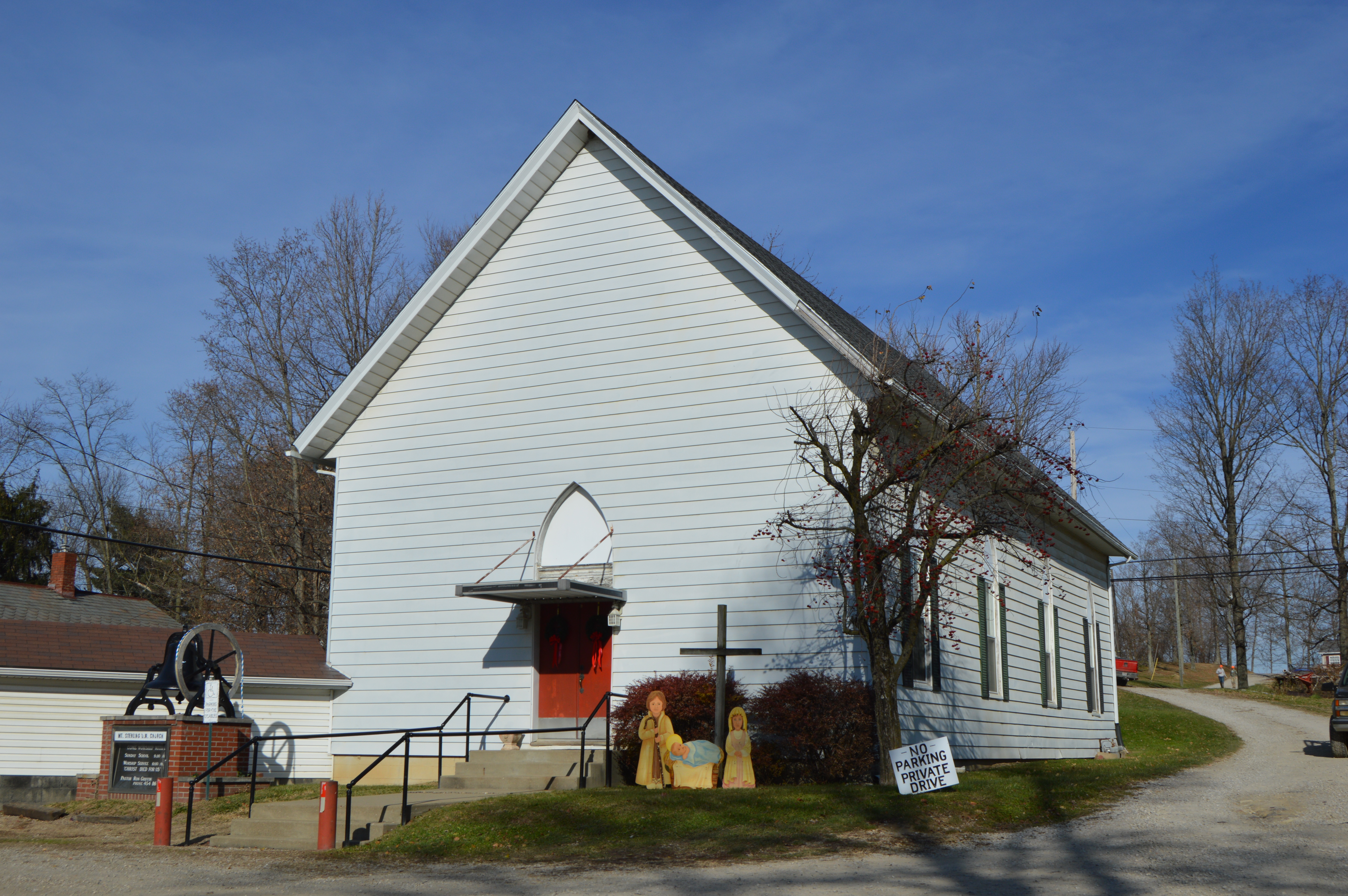
Methodist church

Mount Sterling is an unincorporated community in Muskingum County, in the U.S. state of Ohio.

== History ==
The Hopewell post office was moved to Mount Sterling without a name change some time after it was established in 1830. The Tavener-Sears Tavern on Main Street was listed on the National Register of Historic Places in 1982.
