= Frank S. Tavenner =

American politician (1866–1950)

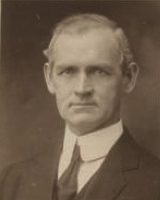

Member of the Virginia Senate from the 10th district
- In office January 10, 1912 – January 12, 1916
- Preceded by: Robert M. Ward
- Succeeded by: Harry F. Byrd
- In office January 13, 1904 – January 8, 1908
- Preceded by: S. L. Lupton
- Succeeded by: Robert M. Ward

Personal details
- Born: Frank Stacy Tavenner; April 25, 1866 Accomac, Virginia, U.S.
- Died: December 7, 1950 (aged 84) Shenandoah, Virginia, U.S.
- Party: Democratic
- Spouse: Sarah Zea
- Children: Frank S. Tavenner Jr.

Frank Stacy Tavenner (April 25, 1866 – December 7, 1950) was an American Democratic politician who served as a member of the Virginia Senate, representing the state's 10th district.

His son Frank S. Tavenner Jr. went on to be United States Attorney for the Western District of Virginia during the administration of Franklin D. Roosevelt and was a lawyer for the House Un-American Activities Committee.

Senate of Virginia
Preceded by S. L. Lupton	Virginia Senator for the 10th District; 1904–1908; 1912–1916	Succeeded by Robert M. Ward
Preceded by Robert M. Ward	Virginia Senator for the 10th District; 1904–1908; 1912–1916	Succeeded by Harry F. Byrd
