= Taverner (surname) =

Taverner is an English-language occupational surname. Notable people with the surname include:

- John le Taverner (fl. 1295–1313), MP for Bristol
- John Taverner (c. 1490–1545), Renaissance English composer
- John Tavener (1944–2013), English composer
- John Taverner (priest) (1584–1638), English Anglican priest
- Richard Taverner (1505–1575), author of Taverner's Bible, a 16th-century translation of the Bible
- Percy A. Taverner (1875–1947), Canadian ornithologist
- Sonia Taverner (1936–2018), English-born Canadian ballet dancer
- William J. Taverner, American sex educator

== Fictional characters ==
- Jason Taverner, the main character in Philip K. Dick's novel Flow My Tears, the Policeman Said
