= Nonogasta =

Coordinates: 29°18′S 67°30′W

- Municipality and village
- Interactive map of Nonogasta
- Country: Argentina
- Province: La Rioja Province
- Time zone: UTC−3 (ART)
- Climate: BWh

Nonogasta (Spanish pronunciation: [nonoˈɣasta]) is a municipality and village in La Rioja Province in northwestern Argentina.
