= Tavener-Sears Tavern =

- U.S. National Register of Historic Places
- Location: Main St., Mount Sterling, Muskingum County, Ohio
- Coordinates: 39°57′25″N 82°09′02″W
- Area: Less than one acre
- Built: 1841
- Architectural style: Federal
- NRHP reference No.: 82003621
- Added to NRHP: April 29, 1982

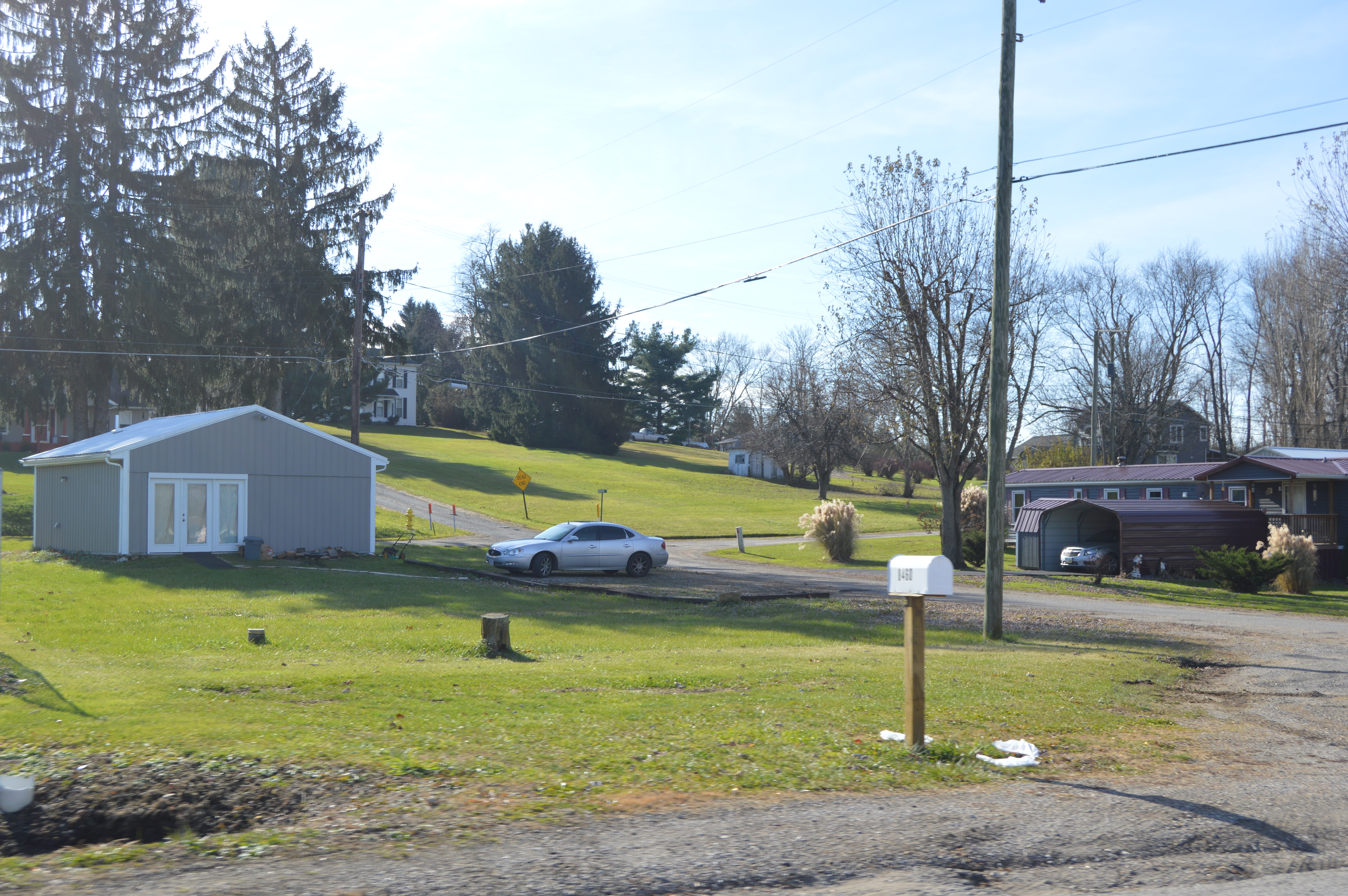
Former site of tavern

The Tavener-Sears Tavern, on Main Street in Mount Sterling, Muskingum County, Ohio, was built in 1841. It was listed on the National Register of Historic Places in 1982. A brick building, it was later a private residence. It has been destroyed.
