= Alexander Carlisle Buchanan =

Alexander Carlisle Buchanan (23 December 1808 – 2 February 1868) was an Irishman appointed by Britain to serve as the Chief Agent for Emigration in Quebec, Lower Canada in 1828. Buchanan himself advised the British authorities to appoint only Canadians as emigration agents, not as immigration officers, to ensure that the administration (of immigration to the colony from the mother country) was "free from local prejudice".
