= Paul Tavernier =

French painter (1852–1943)

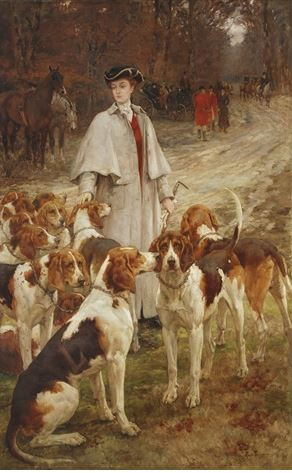
Meeting for the Hunt; Fontainebleau Forest

Paul Tavernier (31 January 1852, Paris - 1943, Fontainebleau) was a French painter who specialized in hunting scenes and animals.

== Biography ==
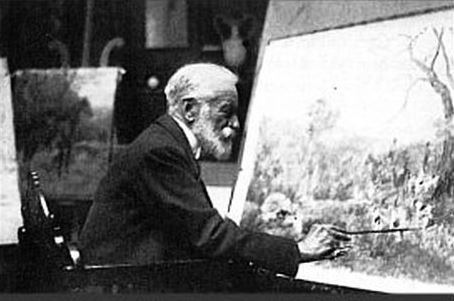
Paul Tavernier in his studio

He was a student of Alexandre Cabanel, Adolphe Yvon and Gustave Guillaumet, who advised him to visit North Africa as a means of lightening his palette. He had his debut at the Salon in 1876. Three years later, he began painting en plein aire near Barbizon, and came under the influence of the painters who had made up the art colony there.

In 1883, he became a member of the Société des artistes français and was awarded a third-class medal for works he had created during his stay in Africa. He would continue to send paintings to their exhibits until 1937.

He was not only an admirer of the area where he chose to paint, he also became involved in the municipal affairs of Fontainebleau, participating in projects to develop the city and preserve its environment. Among other things, he helped to create the Golf de Fontainebleau and decorated its club house. Later, he created murals for the municipal theatre, depicting King Louis XV on a hunt.

In 1901, as an amateur horseman, he was one of the founders of the local racing society; helping to renew the Hippodrome De La Solle, which had been built in 1862.

He received bronze medal at the Exposition Universelle of 1900 and, in 1905, a second-class medal at an exhibition of the École des Paysagistes.

He was last heard from in 1943, during World War II. A street in Fontainebleau bears his name.
