= Richard Taverner =

English Bible translator (1505–1575)

Richard Taverner (1505 – 14 July 1575) was an English author and religious reformer. His Bible translation, commonly known as Taverner's Bible, was originally titled The Most Sacred Bible which is the holy scripture, conteyning the old and new testament, translated into English, and newly recognised with great diligence after most faythful exemplars by Rychard Taverner.

== Life and works ==
Taverner was born at Brisley (about 20 miles northwest of Norwich). He studied at Corpus Christi College and Cardinal College at the University of Oxford, later earning at an MA at Cambridge University. He entered the Inner Temple to study law in 1534.

Later, under Thomas Cromwell's direction, Taverner became actively engaged in producing works designed to encourage the Reformation in England, which included the publication of his translation of the Bible in 1539, and a commentary published in 1540 with Henry VIII's approval. Taverner's Bible was largely a revision of the Matthew Bible. Taverner brought strong Greek scholarship to the task, but his Hebrew was not as good as his Greek, so that the revisions of the New Testament are considered better than those of the Old. In 1539, Taverner published Proverbs or Adages by Desiderius Erasmus Gathered out of the Chiliades and Englished, which was reprinted several times.

Cromwell's fall (and subsequent execution) in 1540 put an end to Taverner's literary output and endangered his position. On 2 December 1541 he was sent to the Tower of London by Henry VIII for failing to pass on a report that Anne of Cleves was pregnant with the King's child after their divorce. Soon after, he was released again. He submitted to the King and was restored to royal favour. In 1544 he both served in the French campaign and acquired the manor of Wood Eaton in Oxfordshire and a house at Norbiton, Surrey.

Under Edward VI, when preachers were scarce, Taverner obtained a licence as a lay preacher. He was also listed as the Member of Parliament for Liverpool in 1547. Though an ardent supporter of the Reformation, Taverner had no intention of becoming a martyr. When Queen Mary I came to the throne in 1553, he welcomed her with An Oration Gratulatory. After losing his position at court, he quietly disappeared from public life during her reign. Upon the accession of Elizabeth I in 1558, he addressed a congratulatory epistle to her, refused a knighthood she offered him, and preached regularly at St. Mary's Church, Oxford. He served as Justice of the Peace for Oxfordshire from 1558 until his death and was appointed High Sheriff of Oxfordshire for 1569–70.

Richard Taverner died on 14 July 1575 and was buried in the chancel of the church at Wood Eaton near Oxford.

== Family ==
The eldest of Richard's younger brothers, Roger Taverner (d. 1572), was a surveyor and writer, and Richard's second son Peter, who established himself at Hexton, Hertfordshire, fathered John Taverner (1584–1638), an Anglican clergyman. Anthony Wood, a great-grandson, was an antiquarian.

== Sources ==
- Paul, William (2003). "Taverner, Richard". English Language Bible Translators. Jefferson, North Carolina and London: McFarland and Company. pp. 222–223.
