= John Taverner (priest) =

English music professor and vicar

- Born: (1584–1638)
- Citizenship: British

John Taverner (1584–1638) was the second son of Peter Taverner, the second son of Richard Taverner.

== Early life and education ==
Peter established himself at Hexton, Hertfordshire before John's birth. John was first educated at Westminster School and then at Trinity College, Cambridge, where he matriculated c. 1597, became a scholar in 1599, graduated BA in 1602, and proceeded MA in 1605.

== Later career ==
He was incorporated at Oxford on 10 March 1606. Between 1611 and 1621 he was secretary for nine years to John King, bishop of London, as well as professor of music at Gresham College from 1610 to 1638 (drafts of some of his lectures survive, as British Library, Sloane MS 2329). His ordination as deacon followed in London on 24 December 1620, then as priest on 13 March 1625. In 1624 he became vicar of Tillingham, Essex, but resigned that benefice in 1629 to become vicar of Hexton and rector of Stoke Newington, and he still held both livings at his time of death. He died between 26 and 29 August 1638 and was buried at Stoke Newington.
