= National University of La Rioja =

Coordinates: 29.4288°S 66.8673°W

- Universidad Nacional de La Rioja
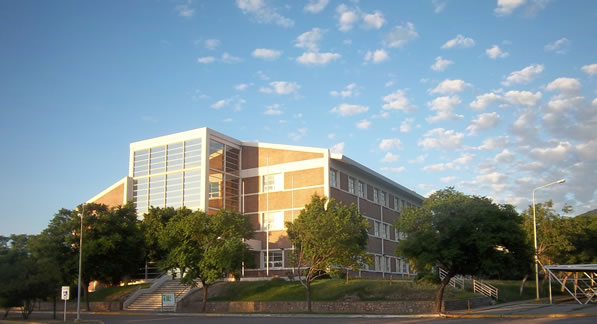
- Sede capital
- Type: Public
- Established: 1993
- Faculty: 1,421
- Students: 20,052
- Location: La Rioja, La Rioja, Argentina
- Website: https://www.unlar.edu.ar/

The National University of La Rioja (Spanish: Universidad Nacional de La Rioja, UNLAR) is an Argentine national university, situated in the city of La Rioja, capital of La Rioja Province. Its precursor, the Provincial University of La Rioja, was established in 1972.

== See also ==
- List of universities in Argentina
