= Andrea Tavernier =

Italian painter (1858–1932)

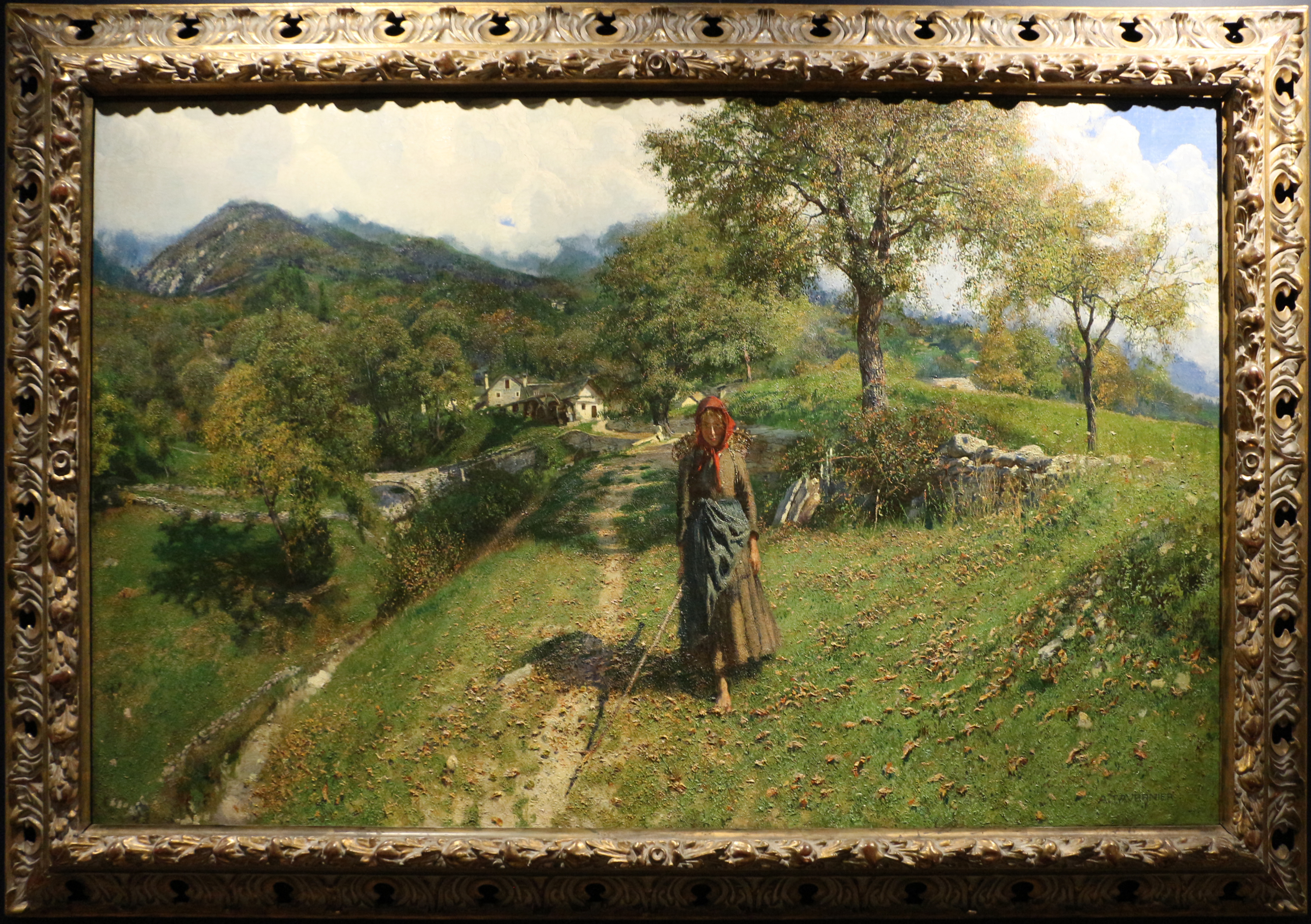
Morning in Autumn, 1902, Gallerie d'Italia, Milan

Andrea Tavernier (Turin, December 23, 1858 - Grottaferrata, 1932) was an Italian painter, mainly of landscapes and urban vedute.

== Biography ==
He was a pupil of Andrea Gastaldi at the Accademia Albertina of Turin. He exhibited landscape Aurea Primaverili at the 1884 Promotrice of Turin. In 1888 at the same Promotrice, he exhibited Contrasti, reproduced in engraving for the catalogue by Carlo Chessa. He traveled to Rome and along the Adriatic coast to find subjects for his paintings. He frequently exhibited at the Venice Biennale. The Biennale of 1922 displayed 36 of his works.
