= National Register of Historic Places listings in Cumberland County, Virginia =

Location of Cumberland County in Virginia

This is a list of the National Register of Historic Places listings in Cumberland County, Virginia.

This is intended to be a complete list of the properties and districts on the National Register of Historic Places in Cumberland County, Virginia, United States. The locations of National Register properties and districts for which the latitude and longitude coordinates are included below, may be seen in an online map.

There are 17 properties and districts listed on the National Register in the county.

This National Park Service list is complete through NPS recent listings posted May 1, 2026.

== Current listings ==
	Name on the Register	Image	Date listed	Location	City or town	Description
1	Ampthill	Ampthill	April 13, 1972 (#72001389)	Western side of Ampthill Rd., 3 miles (4.8 km) north of the junction with State Route 45; 37°41′50″N 78°06′15″W	Cartersville	
2	Bear Creek Lake State Park	Bear Creek Lake State Park	October 31, 2012 (#12000904)	22 Bear Creek Lake Rd. 37°31′56″N 78°16′36″W	Cumberland	
3	Cartersville Bridge	Cartersville Bridge	September 14, 1972 (#72001390)	State Route 45 over James River; 37°40′13″N 78°05′13″W	Cartersville	Extends into Goochland County
4	Cartersville Historic District	Cartersville Historic District	June 10, 1993 (#93000505)	Roughly bounded by State Route 45, High St., and Church Rd. 37°40′01″N 78°05′24″W	Cartersville	
5	Clifton	Clifton	June 19, 1973 (#73002007)	North of Hamilton off Columbia Rd. 37°40′42″N 78°07′38″W	Hamilton	
6	Cumberland County Courthouse	Cumberland County Courthouse	September 30, 1994 (#94001178)	Northern side of U.S. Route 60 at its junction with Stoney Point Rd. 37°29′49″N 78°14′41″W	Cumberland	
7	Cumberland Court House Historic District	Cumberland Court House Historic District	August 16, 2007 (#07000829)	U.S. Route 60 at its junction with Stoney Point Rd. 37°29′46″N 78°14′42″W	Cumberland	
8	Grace Church	Grace Church	October 30, 1980 (#80004185)	West of Cumberland on Caira Rd. 37°29′01″N 78°19′43″W	Ca Ira	
9	Hamilton High School	Hamilton High School	October 31, 2007 (#07001136)	1925 Cartersville Rd. 37°39′29″N 78°07′35″W	Cartersville	
10	High Bridge	High Bridge	September 12, 2008 (#08000875)	Appomattox River; 37°18′45″N 78°19′13″W	Farmville	Extends into Prince Edward County
11	Morven	Morven	December 28, 1990 (#90002014)	State Route 45, 0.5 miles (0.80 km) south of Cartersville; 37°39′34″N 78°05′56″W	Cartersville	
12	Muddy Creek Mill	Muddy Creek Mill	October 9, 1974 (#74002114)	South of Cartersville off Cartersville Rd. 37°38′55″N 78°04′50″W	Tamworth	
13	Needham	Needham	November 10, 1988 (#88002059)	State Route 45, 1.4 miles (2.3 km) north of the junction with U.S. Route 460; 37°19′21″N 78°23′07″W	Farmville	
14	Oak Hill	Oak Hill	July 27, 2005 (#05000764)	181 Oak Hill Rd. 37°29′31″N 78°18′52″W	Cumberland	
15	Pine Grove Elementary School	Pine Grove Elementary School	February 25, 2020 (#100005010)	267 Pinegrove Rd. 37°33′46″N 78°07′59″W	Cumberland	
16	Charles Irving Thornton Tombstone	Charles Irving Thornton Tombstone	November 25, 1980 (#80004186)	West of Cumberland, off Oak Hill Forest Rd. 37°29′37″N 78°18′52″W	Cumberland	
17	Trenton	Trenton	July 27, 2005 (#05000765)	751 Oak Hill Rd. 37°31′39″N 78°17′07″W	Cumberland	

== See also ==
- List of National Historic Landmarks in Virginia
- National Register of Historic Places listings in Virginia
