= Virginia State Route 45 =

State highway in central Virginia, US

State Route 45

Route information
- Maintained by VDOT
- Length: 39.72 mi (63.92 km)
- Existed: 1928–present

Major junctions
- South end: US 15 Bus. / US 460 Bus. in Farmville
- US 60 in Cumberland
- North end: SR 6 at Georges Tavern

Location
- Country: United States
- State: Virginia
- Counties: Prince Edward, Cumberland, Goochland

Highway system
- Virginia Routes; Interstate; US; Primary; Secondary; Byways; History; HOT lanes
← SR 43	→ SR 46

State Route 45 (SR 45) is a primary state highway in the U.S. state of Virginia. The state highway runs 39.72 miles (63.92 km) from the junction of U.S. Route 15 Business (US 15 Business) and US 460 Business in Farmville north to SR 6 at Georges Tavern. SR 45 is the primary north–south highway of Cumberland County, where the highway meets US 60 near the county seat, Cumberland.

== Route description ==
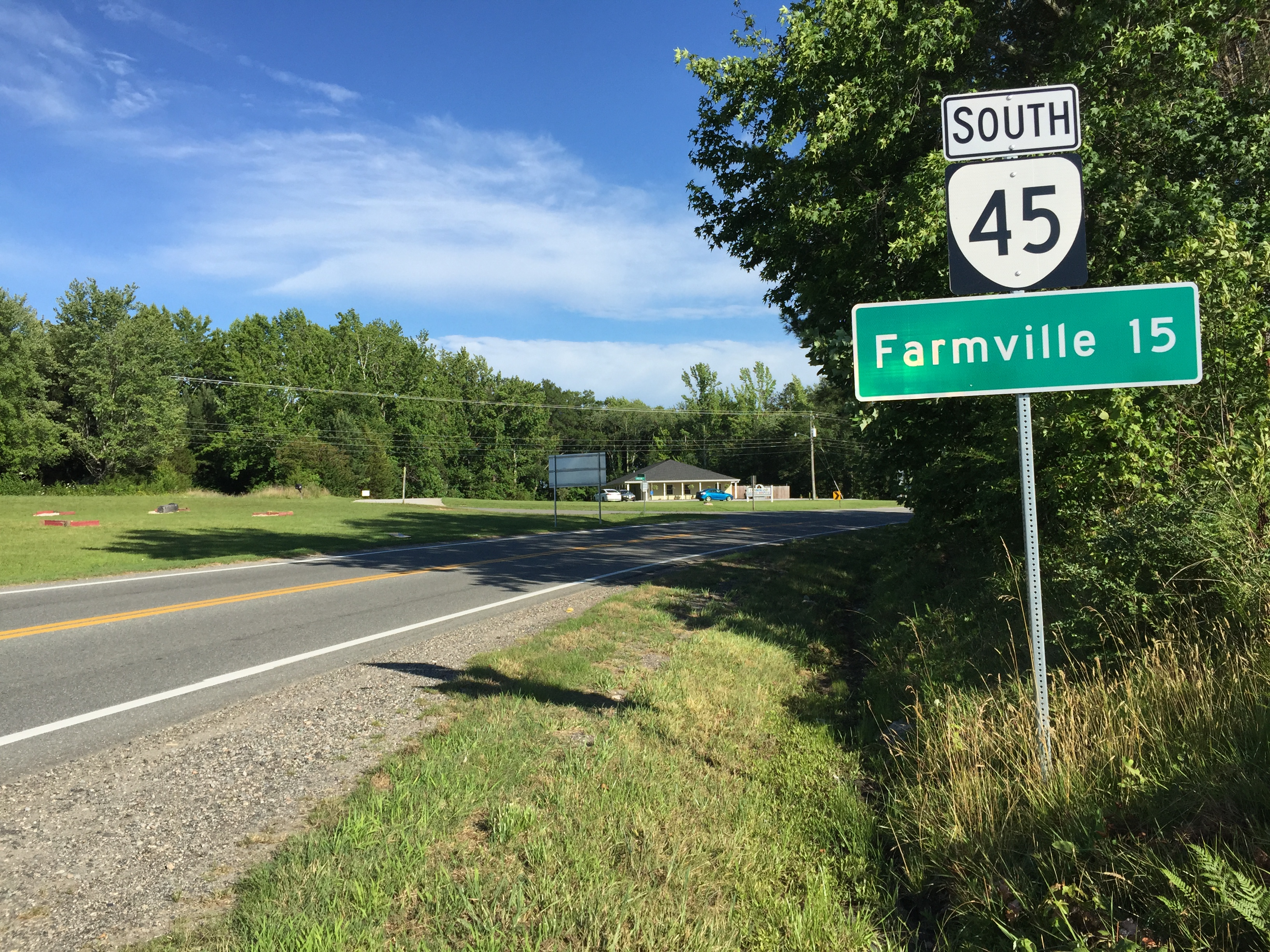
View south along SR 45 at US 60 in Cumberland

SR 45 begins at an intersection with US 15 Business and US 460 Business near the campus of Longwood University in the town of Farmville, which has portions in Prince Edward and Cumberland counties. US 15 Business heads south on Main Street and US 460 Business heads east on Third Street; the two business routes head west together on Third Street. SR 45 heads north on Main Street and intersects the High Bridge Trail, a rail trail along a former Norfolk Southern Railway line. The state highway leaves the downtown area and crosses the Appomattox River into Cumberland County. SR 45 heads northeast from the town as Cumberland Road, which passes through the small communities of Raines Tavern, Hawk, Guinea Mills, and McRae on its way to a junction with US 60 (James Anderson Highway).

SR 45 and US 60 run concurrently northeast past the county seat of Cumberland. The two highways meet the western end of SR 13 before they separate. SR 45 heads northeast as Cartersville Road through the hamlets of Ashby and Whiteville on its way to Hamilton. In Hamilton, the state highway veers east, then turns north next to the historic home Morven to head into Cartersville. SR 45 bypasses the Cartersville Historic District to the east as it descends to the James River. The state highway crosses the river immediately upstream of the ruins of the historic Cartersville Bridge. SR 45 continues through Goochland County to its northern terminus at SR 6 (River Road) at Georges Tavern.

== Major intersections ==
County	Location	mi	km	Destinations	Notes
Prince Edward	Farmville	0.00	0.00	US 15 Bus. / US 460 Bus. (South Main Street / Third Street)	Southern terminus
Cumberland	Hillcrest	15.43	24.83	US 60 west (James Anderson Highway) – Lexington	Southern end of US 60 concurrency
Cumberland		18.94	30.48	SR 13 east (Old Buckingham Road) – Tobaccoville	Western terminus of SR 13
Cumberland		20.28	32.64	US 60 east (Anderson Highway) / SR 682 south (Northfield Road) – Richmond	Northern end of US 60 concurrency
Cumberland	Hamilton			SR 689 (Cedar Spring Road) / SR 690 (Columbia Road)	former SR 27 north
Cumberland				SR 616 (Deep Run Road) / SR 684 (Cartersville Extension) – Powhatan	former SR 27 south
Goochland	Georges Tavern	39.72	63.92	SR 6 (River Road West) – Scottsville, Richmond	Northern terminus
1.000 mi = 1.609 km; 1.000 km = 0.621 mi: Concurrency terminus

< SR 44	Two‑digit State Routes; 1923-1933	SR 46 >
< SR 132	Spurs of SR 13; 1923–1928	none
< SR 309	District 3 State Routes; 1928–1933	SR 311 >
