= Trenton (Cumberland, Virginia) =

Historic house in Virginia, United States

- U.S. National Register of Historic Places
- Virginia Landmarks Register
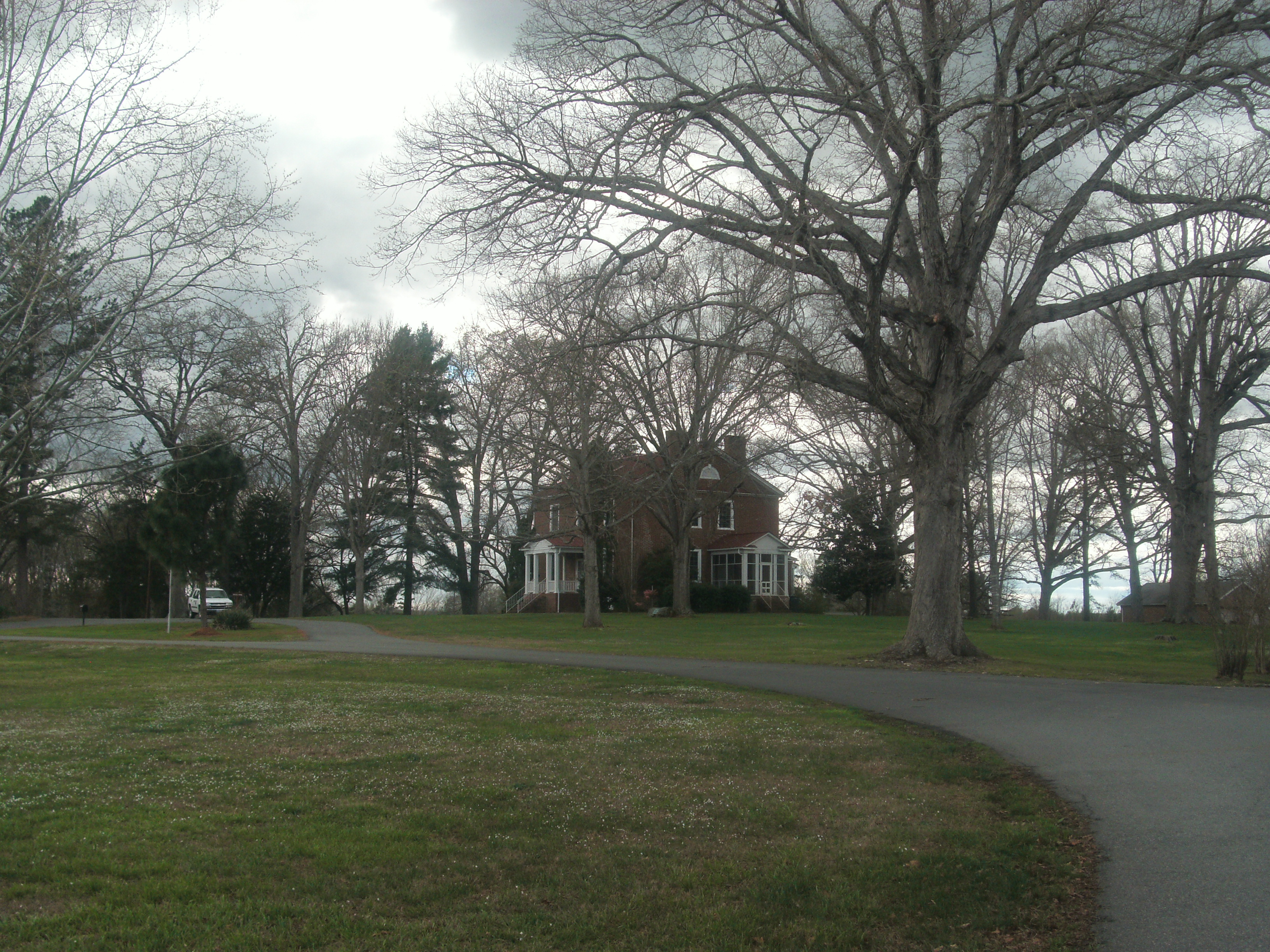
- The house, seen in April 2017

- Location within Virginia Location within the United States
- Location: 751 Oak Hill Rd., Cumberland, Virginia
- Coordinates: 37°31′45″N 78°17′7″W
- Area: 13 acres (5.3 ha)
- Built: 1829
- Architectural style: Federal, Classical Revival
- NRHP reference No.: 05000765
- VLR No.: 024-0001

Significant dates
- Added to NRHP: July 27, 2005
- Designated VLR: June 1, 2005

Trenton, also known as the "Brick House," is a historic plantation home located near Cumberland, Cumberland County, Virginia. It was built about 1829, and is a 2 1/2-story, brick dwelling with a center-passage, double-pile floor plan, in the Federal style. It has transitional elements of the Early Classical Revival style. A one-story, shed roofed addition was built about 1960. Also on the property are a contributing stable (c. 1930), brick shed/smokehouse, (c. 1930), grading building (c. 1950), and family cemetery. In 1936, the property was acquired by the Resettlement Administration and conveyed by deed to the Department of Conservation and Economic Development in 1954. Since then, it was used as the State Forest superintendent's home for the Cumberland State Forest until 1990.

It was listed on the National Register of Historic Places in 2005.
