= Cumberland County Courthouse =

Cumberland County Courthouse may refer to:

- Cumberland County Courthouse (Toledo, Illinois), listed on the National Register of Historic Places (NRHP)
- Cumberland County Courthouse (New Jersey), NRHP contributing property
- Cumberland County Courthouse (Fayetteville, North Carolina), NRHP-listed
- Cumberland County Courthouse (Tennessee), NRHP-listed
- Cumberland County Courthouse (Cumberland, Virginia), 1818-built and NRHP-listed
- Cumberland County Courthouse (Maine), built in 1910
