= Grace Church (Ca Ira, Virginia) =

Historic church in Virginia, US

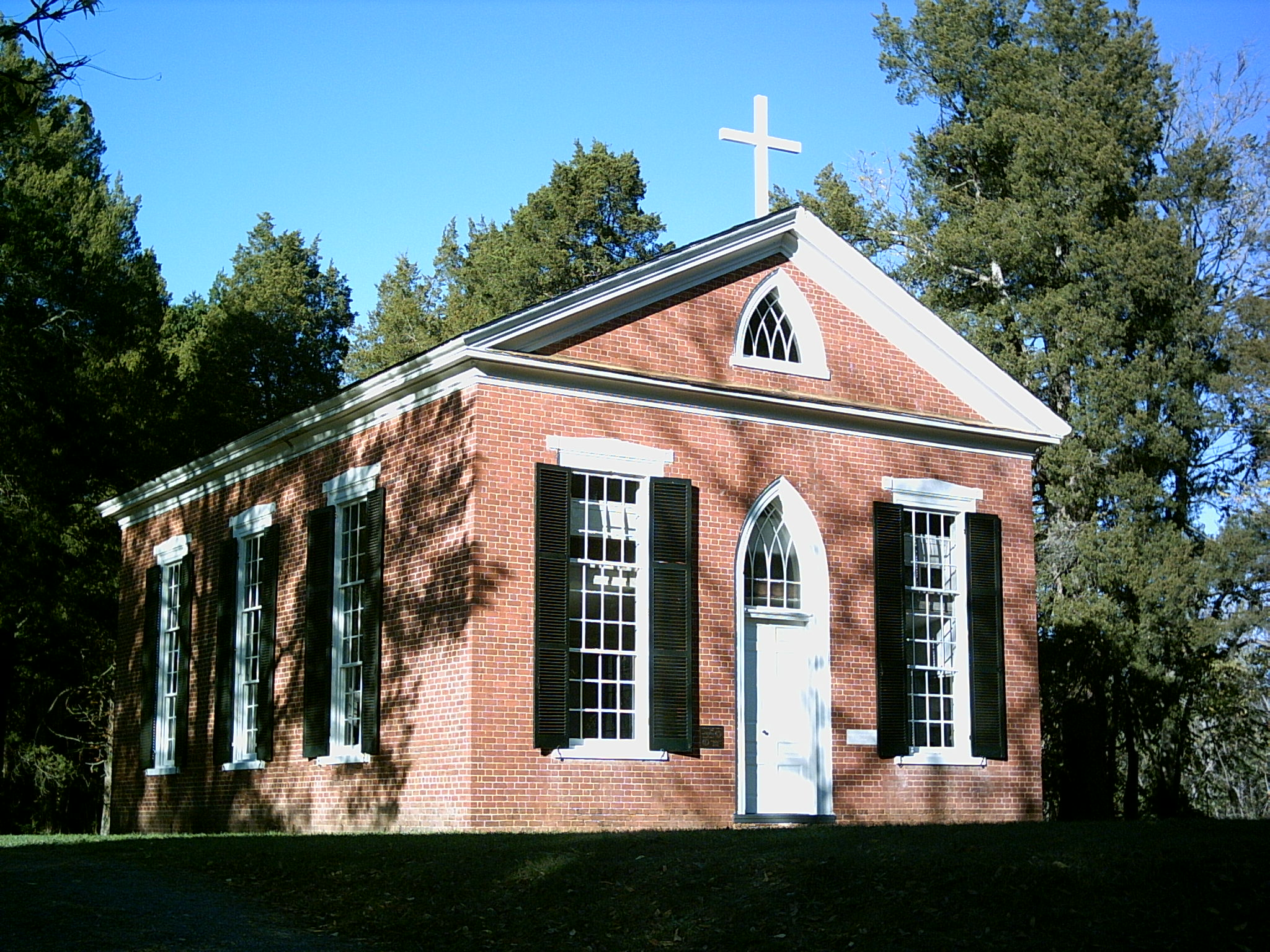
- Front view of the church, taken in October, 2008

- Location of the church within Virginia Grace Church (Ca Ira, Virginia) (the United States)

Religion
- Affiliation: Episcopal Church in the United States of America
- Ecclesiastical or organisational status: Parish church
- Year consecrated: 1843
- Status: Rarely used

Location
- Location: Ca Ira, Virginia
- Municipality: Littleton Parish
- State: Virginia
- Coordinates: 37.4833°N 78.3289°W

Architecture
- Architect: Dabney Cosby
- Type: Church
- Style: Greek Revival
- General contractor: Valentine Parrish
- Groundbreaking: 1840
- Completed: 1843
- Materials: Brick

U.S. National Register of Historic Places
- Added to NRHP: October 30, 1980
- NRHP Reference no.: 80004185
- Virginia Landmarks Register
- Designated: June 17, 1980
- Reference no.: 024-0009

Website
- none

Grace Church (sometimes called Grace Episcopal Church) is an Episcopal church in Cumberland County, Virginia. Designed by Dabney Cosby, a former assistant to Thomas Jefferson, it is the only substantial building remaining from the former community of Ca Ira, once a major tobacco exporting point on the Willis River, a tributary of the James River. Grace Church was listed on the National Register of Historic Places on October 30, 1980.

== History ==
At the turn of the nineteenth century, Ca Ira was a small farming community similar to many around Virginia. The Virginia General Assembly formally established the town in 1796; the origin of the name is unknown, but given the spirit of the times, and the fact that many Virginians admired the French Revolution, it is suspected to have been derived from a popular French song of the era, or the Democratic Republican party or because French Huguenots had arrived in the era, possible from the earlier settlement downriver on the James at Manakin Sabot. In 1801 Ca Ira had 300 residents and Craddoch Wisdom was the tobacco inspector at Dean's Warehouse (though he resided in 1804). Three decades later, in 1836, Ca Ira could be described as a post village: its population of 210 was served by forty dwellings, three stores, a mill, a tobacco warehouse, two taverns, and a Masonic hall. Despite the thriving tobacco economy, and the construction of the James River Canal to improve navigation on the James River (which required considerable annual maintenance because of debris washed down by and damage by frequent floods), river traffic would slow down and eventually vanish with the development of railroads before the Civil War.

Construction of Grace Church was begun in 1840 by slaves of Col. Valentine The original deed to its location was described in the Cumberland County Deed Book of 1843 as

a certain lot or parcel or ground adjoining the town of Ca Ira on the West, and bounded as follows. Orig. on the South by the Main road from Ca Ira to Buckingham Ct. House, West by the line separating it from McAshan's Old Stemmery Lot, on which the fence now runs North by the road leading into said stemmery and, East by the Western Crop Street of the town of Ca Ira, it being the lot, as now enclosed whereon the New Episcopal Church, called Grace Church, has been recently erected, containing about two thirds of an acre, together with all the appurtenances thereunto belonging.

Upon completion, it served not only townspeople, but many prominent in local affairs who owned the surrounding plantations. Valentine Parrish not only donated the land on which it stood, but served as the builder for the project. The architect was Dabney Cosby, who had worked with Thomas Jefferson on the construction of buildings at the University of Virginia. This was not the first time that Cosby and Parrish had worked together; the two were listed together as co-architects on the cornerstone of the 1826 Goochland County Courthouse in nearby Goochland. Parrish was among the most prominent citizens in Cumberland County in the years leading up to the Civil War; he presented numerous petitions on the subject of local tolls to the Virginia General Assembly, and also made numerous suggestions regarding the distribution of economic aid to the county. Woodwork and framing on the church is said to have been the work of one Albert Mann, a slave attached to the Parrish plantation; construction of the church was overseen by Rev. Henry Kinckle.

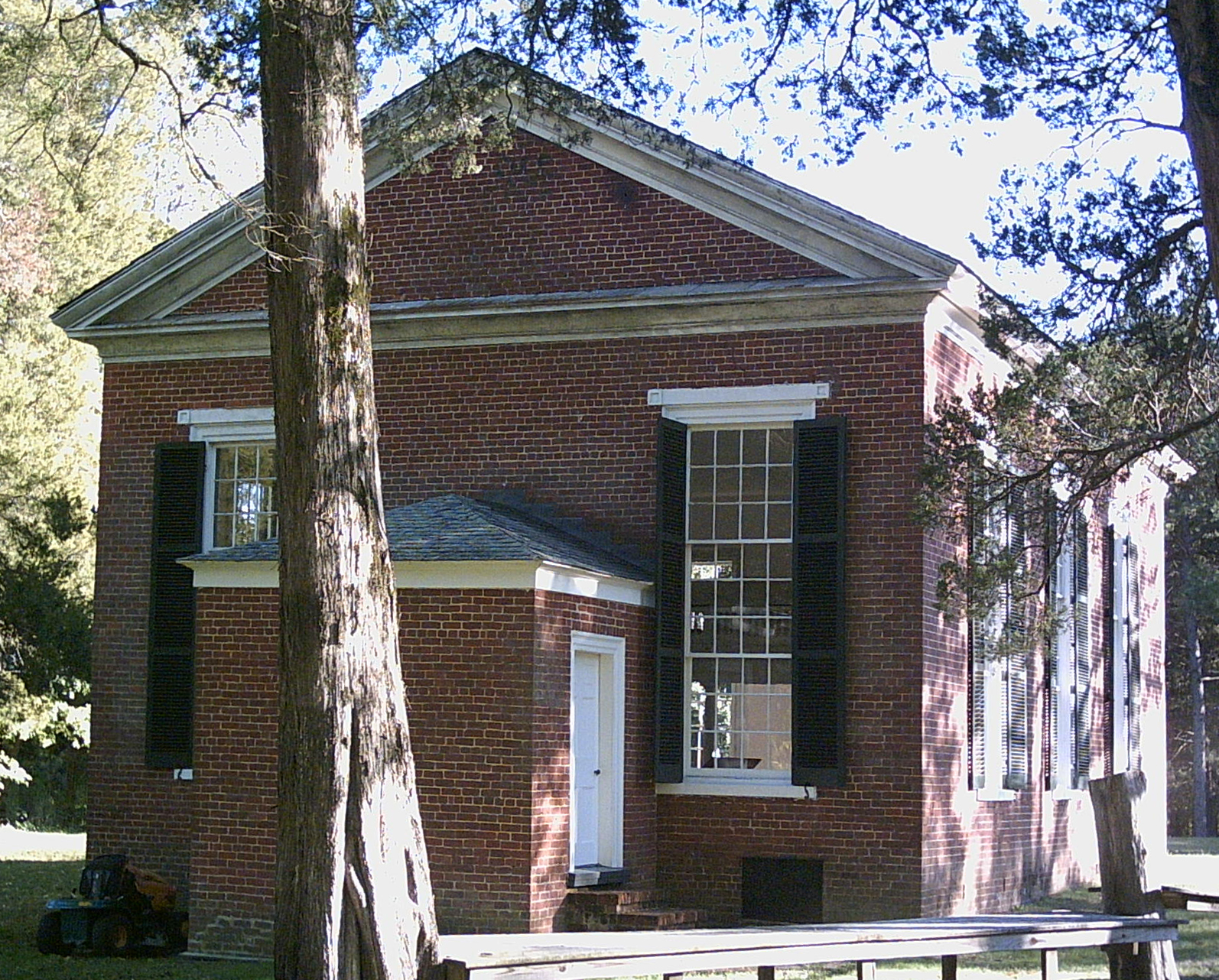
Back of the church seen from the cemetery, including the vestry

With the completion of Grace Church in 1843 the town received its largest and most distinguished building to date. The church also revived the fortunes of Littleton parish, which surrounded the town but which had been inactive since 1813. An 1857 report from Bishop William Meade indicated that the structure was "in constant use". Even so, although Ca Ira had continued to rise in importance through the 1850s, at one point incorporating its first and only bank, by the postbellum years it had begun losing population, and shrank rapidly during the last decades of the nineteenth century. The church was not spared, and was abandoned along with most other structures during this period; a 1906 entry in the Lippincott World Gazetteer mentioned its presence among a handful of other buildings, mainly shops. The rehabilitation of the structure began in 1928, when descendants of members of the initial congregation organized the Ca Ira Restoration Society; this organization was dedicated to raising funds to restore the building, which was soon accomplished. The Society also blocked an attempt by the diocese to sell the property, and in 1954 reinstituted an annual series of "homecoming services" in continuation of a tradition begun in the 1930s. Today, Grace Church is preserved in working order as a shrine of the Episcopal Diocese of Southern Virginia; to keep its status as such, it is required to host at least one religious service yearly.

The church was surveyed as part of the Historic American Buildings Survey sometime after 1933.

== Description ==
Grace Church, Ca Ira, survives as a charming illustration of the stylistic hybridization that occurred with Romantic Revivalism in the antebellum period. Unlike many of its similarly imaginative contemporaries, Grace Church is devoid of architectural naivete and is at once a skillful blending of Roman, Greek, and Gothic Revival elements, all executed with superb crnftsmanship. Its temple form and fine brickwork are an offspring of Virginia's Jeffersonian tradition, while its Greek and Gothic details are adapted from builders' pattern books.

=== Exterior ===
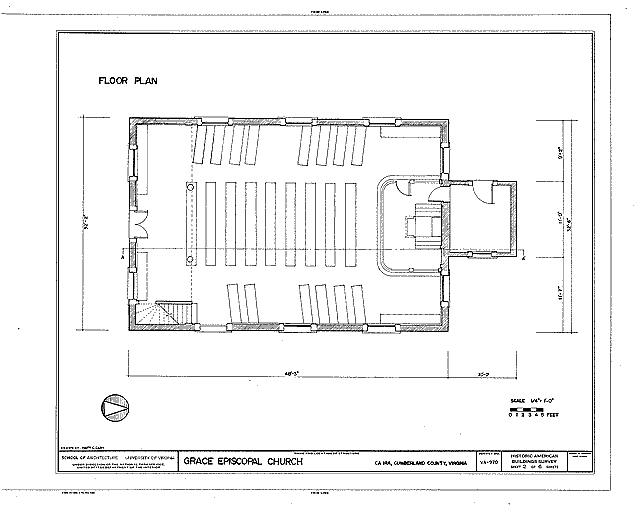
A floor plan of the church

The exterior of Grace Church reflects the influence of Roman, Greek, and Gothic Revival architecture on mid-nineteenth-century American architectural design. Described as a "temple-form country church", it measures 32' x 48'; there is a small vestry attached to the back of the building. The church sits on a foundation of brick, and has ventilation holes at its base. Its walls are built of handmade bricks, even in color and unglazed; the mortar joints are deliberately precise. Two styles of brickwork were used in construction; the front and east side are of Flemish bond, the north side is of five-course American bond, and the west side is a combination or the two, with four-course American substituted for the five-course. Original penciling may still be seen in the mortar joints.

All elevations are fitted with windows; these are triple-hung with 12/12 sash, and are hung with louvered shutters and 8-inch rectilinear moldings; the moldings have been topped by ramped lintels with 6-inch-square corner blocks. Sitting over the entryway is a lancet transom with intersecting tracery, a similar design to which may also be seen in the window in the tympanum. On the east side of the church, the first bay is a jib window which according to local lore was used for funerals. The roof is surrounded by a cove cornice which serves to define two pediments, one in either facade. The roof is covered by Buckingham County, Virginia Buckingham Slate. Later additions to the exterior include a pair of small chimneys and a small wooden cross, which latter is situated at the apex of the front pediment and was erected in the 1950s.

=== Interior ===
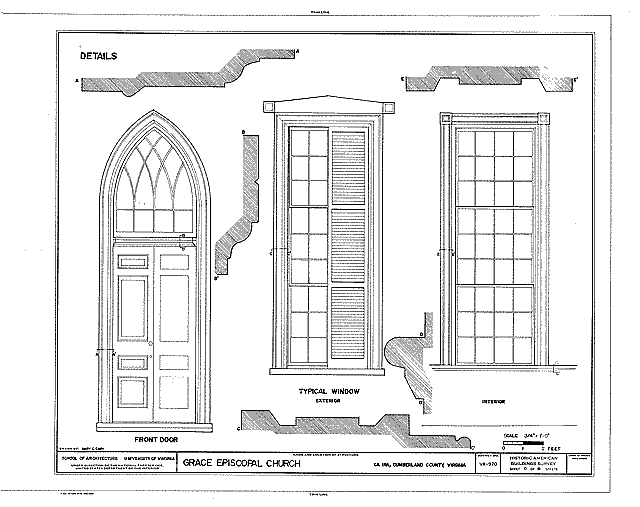
Architectural drawings of some of the interior fittings

The church interior consists of one single room; the vestry, which is situated behind the sanctuary proper, is in a later addition to the building. There are two main aisles in the nave; these are formed by the placement of the original pews in the building. Of the pews, those in the center are freestanding, and larger than those on the sides; these have been angled slightly and attached to the side walls. There is a gallery in the south wall, with one center aisle and two down its sides. It is supported by a pair of Doric columns on the side walls, as well as by a number of pilasters. There is a dentiled entablature, set above the columns and topped by a railing with turned balusters. Entry to the gallery is achieved via an enclosed stairway on the east side; one wall is fitted with beaded diagonal paneling, and there is no stair rail.

The pulpit for the church is attached to its north wall, enclosed in a communion rail with rectangular rungs. It is paneled and inset with a bold Greek fret in its frieze. This appears to have been adapted from a design found in the Practical House Carpenter of Asher Benjamin, a popular builders' pattern book first published in 1830; with numerous other details, most especially the building's architraves, it indicates Cosby's familiarity with the popular architectural styles of the day. Near the pulpit is a baptismal font of marble. Also remaining in the church are two wood-burning stoves, elaborate constructions in cast iron, bearing the maker's mark of "Leibrandt & McDowell, Philadelphia & Baltimore". The dado running the perimeter of the main room is paneled and incorporates a chair rail. The floor is unfinished, while the walls and ceiling are covered in plaster.

=== Cemetery ===
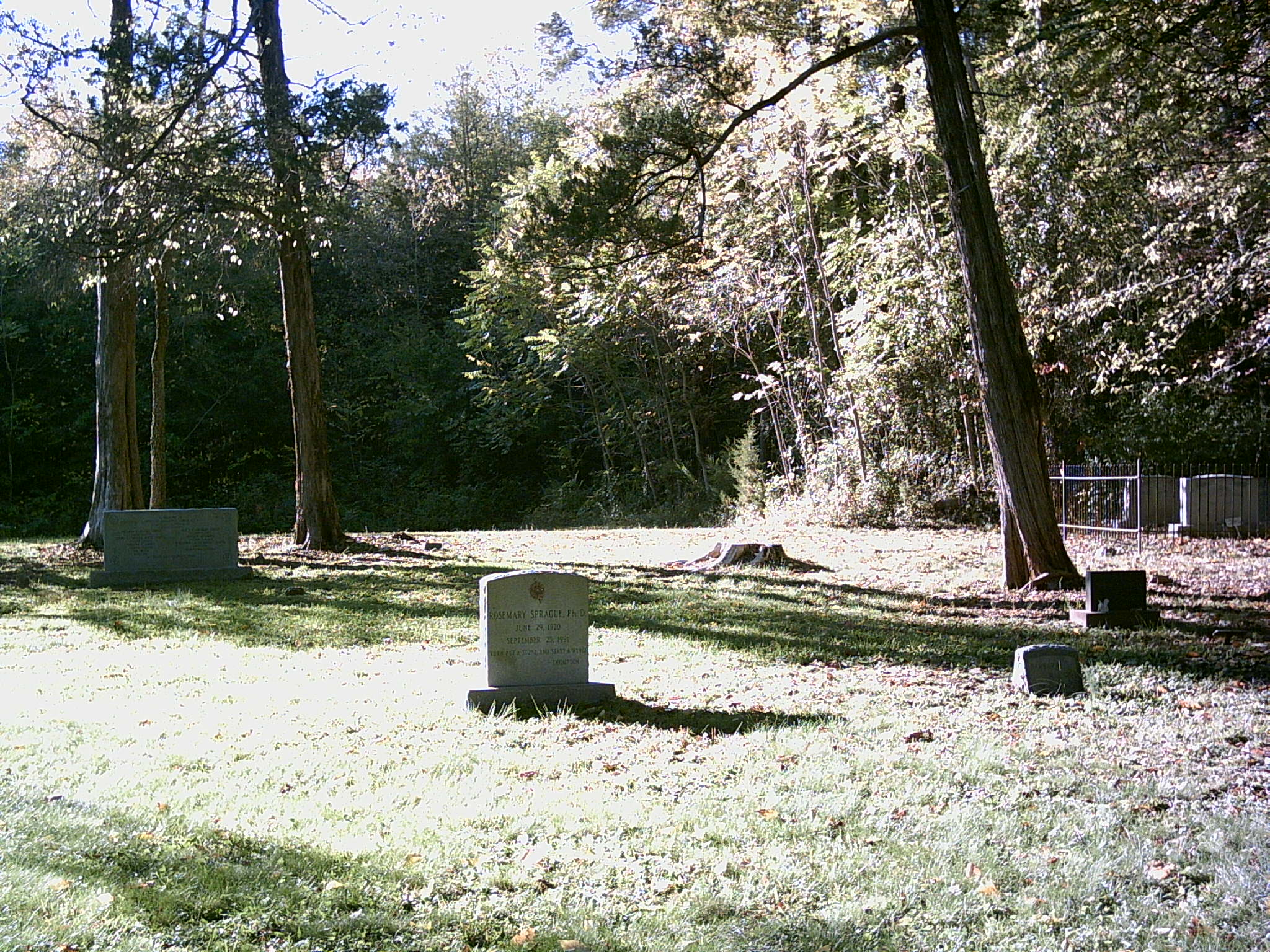
View of the church cemetery.

There is a small cemetery attached to the church grounds, located at the back in a hilly, wooded area overlooking the Willis River. Just when burials began is unknown; the earliest legible headstones date to the 1880s. It is possible that earlier burials exist; however, most of the grave markers on the grounds are nearly completely worn away, and as a result the total number of interments is unknown. Two veterans of the Confederate Army are also buried in the cemetery.

The church and cemetery are together contained in the National Register listing, as is the land on which both stand; the parcel, approximately two-thirds of an acre in area, follows the lines of the original deed of the property as recorded in Cumberland County records.

== Significance ==
Grace Church is significant for a number of reasons, its association with Dabney Cosby, and through him the Jeffersonian school of architecture seen across Virginia in the second quarter of the nineteenth century. The building stands as a preserved example of a rural Virginia church, incorporating elements of various architectural styles into its construction; it also serves as one of the last reminders and best-preserved, of the merchant community of Ca Ira.

== See also ==
- National Register of Historic Places listings in Cumberland County, Virginia, for other nearby historic sites
