= Trents Mill, Virginia =

Unincorporated community in Virginia, United States

Coordinates: 37°33′18″N 78°17′22″W

Trents Mill is an unincorporated community in Cumberland County, in the U.S. state of Virginia.
