= Cumberland Court House Historic District =

Historic district in Virginia, United States

- U.S. National Register of Historic Places
- U.S. Historic district
- Virginia Landmarks Register
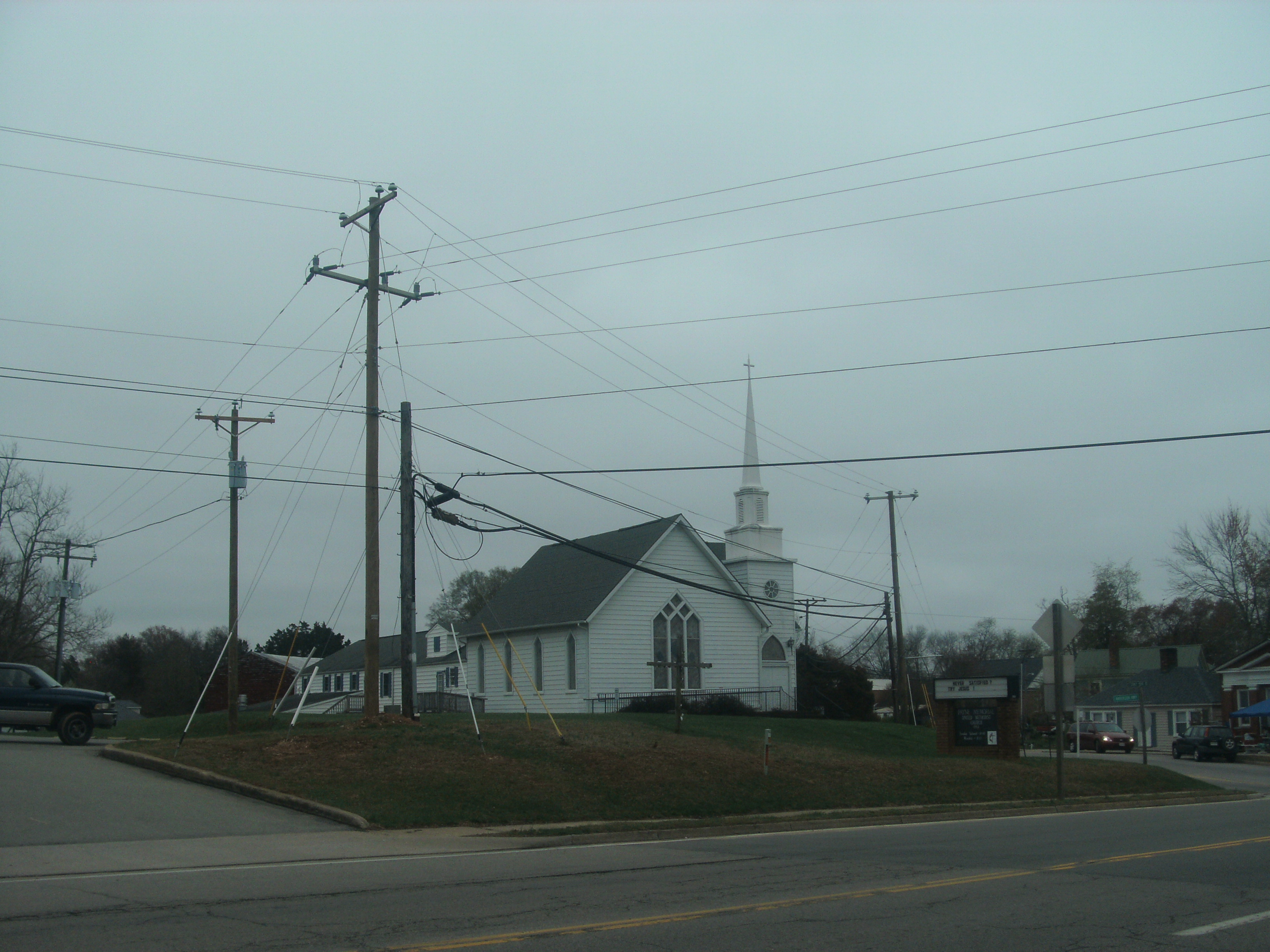
- Payne Memorial United Methodist Church, taken in 2015

- Location within Virginia Location within the United States
- Location: VA 60, junction of VA 600, Cumberland, Virginia
- Coordinates: 37°29′55″N 78°14′41″W
- Area: 372 acres (151 ha)
- Built: 1777
- Architect: Howard, William A.
- Architectural style: Federal, Greek Revival
- NRHP reference No.: 07000829
- VLR No.: 024-5025

Significant dates
- Added to NRHP: August 16, 2007
- Designated VLR: June 6, 2007

Cumberland Court House Historic District is a national historic district located at Cumberland, Cumberland County, Virginia. The district encompasses 111 contributing buildings, 5 contributing sites, and 8 contributing objects in the county seat of Cumberland County, Virginia. It includes the governmental core of the village and the residential, commercial, educational, and religious resources that have grown up around the courthouse since Cumberland's designation as the county seat in 1777. In addition to the separately listed Cumberland County Courthouse complex, notable buildings include Burleigh Hall (c. 1810), Woodlawn (c. 1800), Center Presbyterian Church (1852), Red Rose Inn, Stewart-Crockett House, All Saints Episcopal Church (c. 1890), Larkin Garrett House (1903), Flippen-Crawley House (1905), Joseph Carpenter House (1903), Masonic Lodge #283 (1903), and Payne Memorial United Methodist Church (1914).

It was listed on the National Register of Historic Places in 2007.
