= Kimberly Hills, Virginia =

Unincorporated community in Virginia, United States

Coordinates: 37°19′37″N 78°23′19″W

Kimberly Hills is an unincorporated community in Cumberland County, in the U.S. state of Virginia.
