= Bear Lake State Park =

Bear Lake State Parks may refer to:

- Bear Lake State Park (Idaho), on Bear Lake, Idaho, U.S., near the Utah-Idaho border
- Bear Lake State Park (Utah), on Bear Lake, Utah, U.S., near the Utah-Idaho border

== See also ==
- Bear Creek Lake State Park, Virginia, U.S.
- Bear Head Lake State Park, Minnesota, U.S.
