= Trenton Mills, Virginia =

Unincorporated community in Virginia, United States

Coordinates: 37°37′46″N 78°13′42″W

Trenton Mills is an unincorporated community in Cumberland County, in the U.S. state of Virginia.
