= Cotton Town, Virginia =

Unincorporated community in Virginia, United States

Coordinates: 37°23′49″N 78°18′07″W

Cotton Town is an unincorporated community in Cumberland County, in the U.S. state of Virginia.
