= Hatcher, Virginia =

Unincorporated community in Virginia, United States

Coordinates: 37°33′43″N 78°17′57″W

Hatcher is an unincorporated community in Cumberland County, in the U.S. state of Virginia.
