= Ca Ira, Virginia =

Community in Cumberland County, Virginia, US

Coordinates: 37°29′0″N 78°19′37.1″W

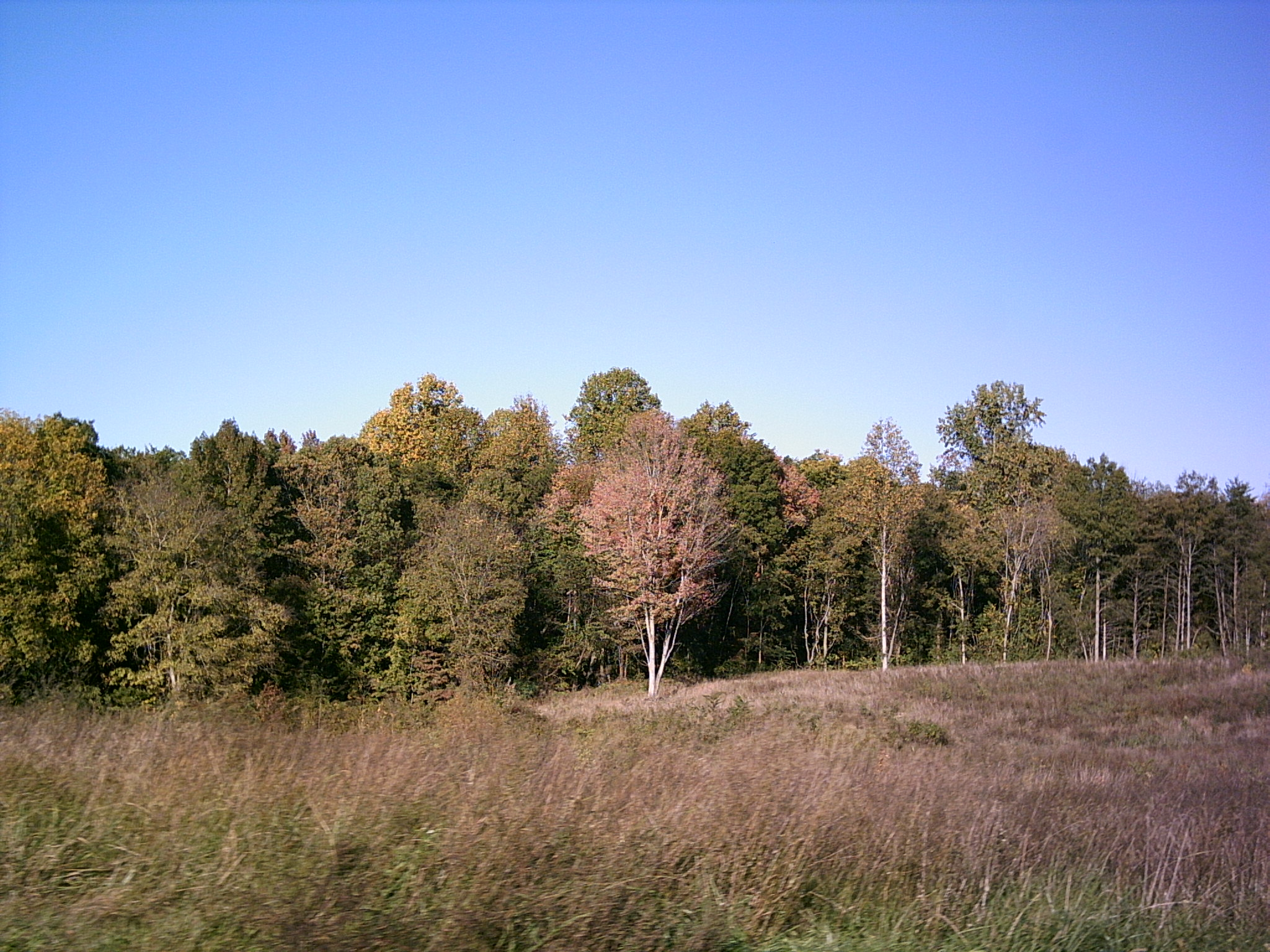
Woods on the former site of Ca Ira

Ca Ira was a small community located in Cumberland County, Virginia. Formally established in 1796, it fell into disuse in the years after the American Civil War; today, few traces of the town remain, save for the old Grace Church and a handful of houses.

== History ==
At the turn of the nineteenth century, Ca Ira was a typical small farming community such as could be found in many locations around Virginia. The community of Ca Ira, located along Virginia State Route 632 and near the Willis River, served as a takeout point for the Willis River and as the main exporting point along the Willis. The community took its name from a popular French marching song, Ça Ira (meaning "it'll be fine"), reflecting the popular enthusiasm for the French Revolution in Virginia at the time. Though originally established by the General Assembly in 1796, it reached its high point between 1827 and 1860. Described by Joseph Martin in 1836 in The Gazetteer of Virginia and the District of Columbia, the village of Ca Ira contained approximately 40 dwellings, three mercantile stores a merchant mill a tobacco warehouse, two taverns, a non-denominational church, and a masonic hall. The population at the time was 310 and mail was delivered three times a week. Amongst the residents were two blacksmiths, two wheelwrights, two tailors, and two plough manufacturers.

The rapid expansion of this community took place as a result of the removal of a dam along the large pond adjacent to the area. Ca Ira stagnated until 1825, when the Willis River canal was completed. Prior to this, the surrounding pond has produced conditions for bilious attacks which has twice nearly depopulated the town, completely. This served numerous purposes; it caused the removal of a pond, long the source of poor health for residents and, more importantly, it opened the town up to the tobacco trade, making it easier to transport wares along the James River between Prince Edward and Charlotte Counties and Richmond and Petersburg.

During its heyday, Ca Ira boasted $40,000 worth of sales annually by its three mercantile stores, 28-30,000 bushels of wheat ground at the mill during the season, and 300 to 500 hogsheads of tobacco received.

With the completion, in 1843, of Grace Church, Ca Ira had its most important and distinguished building; this not only served as a place of worship, but acted as a gathering place for members of surrounding plantations.

Good fortune was not to last, however; the town's heyday came in the middle of the 1850s, when it incorporated a bank. Its postbellum decline was rapid; the church, along with most of the rest of the town, was deserted by the end of the 19th century. A 1906 visit found little more than a "post hamlet," with only a handful of houses, a post office, two stores, and the church surviving among the ruins of warehouses and other structures. Of these, only the church exists today, although some newer houses have been erected in the vicinity.

Today, Virginia State Route 632 is known as "Ca Ira Road" where it passes through the site of the former village. Only a few buildings survive from the once-thriving community. The extant structures located along Route 632 near the Ca Ira Pond include Grace Episcopal Church, now on the National Register, approximately five modest dwellings, and the Ca Ira Fishing Club. Of these, only the church and the fishing lodge date to Ca Ira's period of prosperity.

== See also ==
- List of ghost towns in Virginia
