= Cumberland State Forest =

State forest in Virginia, United States

- IUCN category VI (protected area with sustainable use of natural resources)
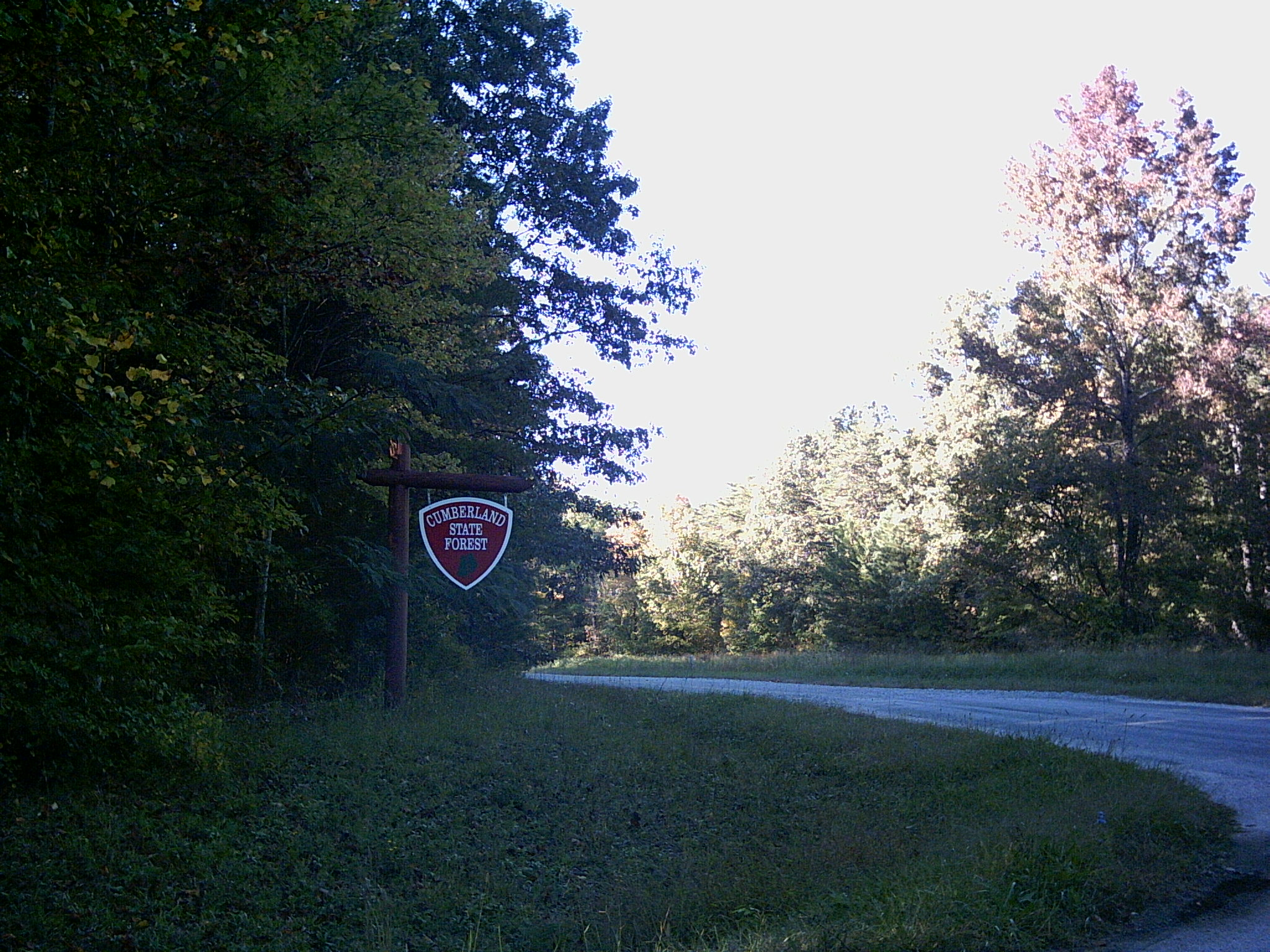
- Entrance of Cumberland State Forest
- Interactive map of Cumberland State Forest
- Location: Cumberland County and Buckingham County, VA USA
- Nearest city: Cumberland, VA
- Coordinates: 37°0′0″N 78°0′0″W
- Area: 16,169 acres (65.43 km^{2})
- Established: 1939
- Governing body: Virginia Department of Forestry

Cumberland State Forest is a Virginia state forest located in the piedmont of the state, in Cumberland and Buckingham counties. The 16,169-acre (65.43 km^{2}) forest borders the Willis River. Within its confines may be found Bear Creek Lake State Park and a small family cemetery containing the grave of Charles Irving Thornton; the grave marker, with its inscription by Charles Dickens, is on the National Register of Historic Places.
