= Clifton (Hamilton, Virginia) =

Historic house in Virginia, United States

- U.S. National Register of Historic Places
- Virginia Landmarks Register
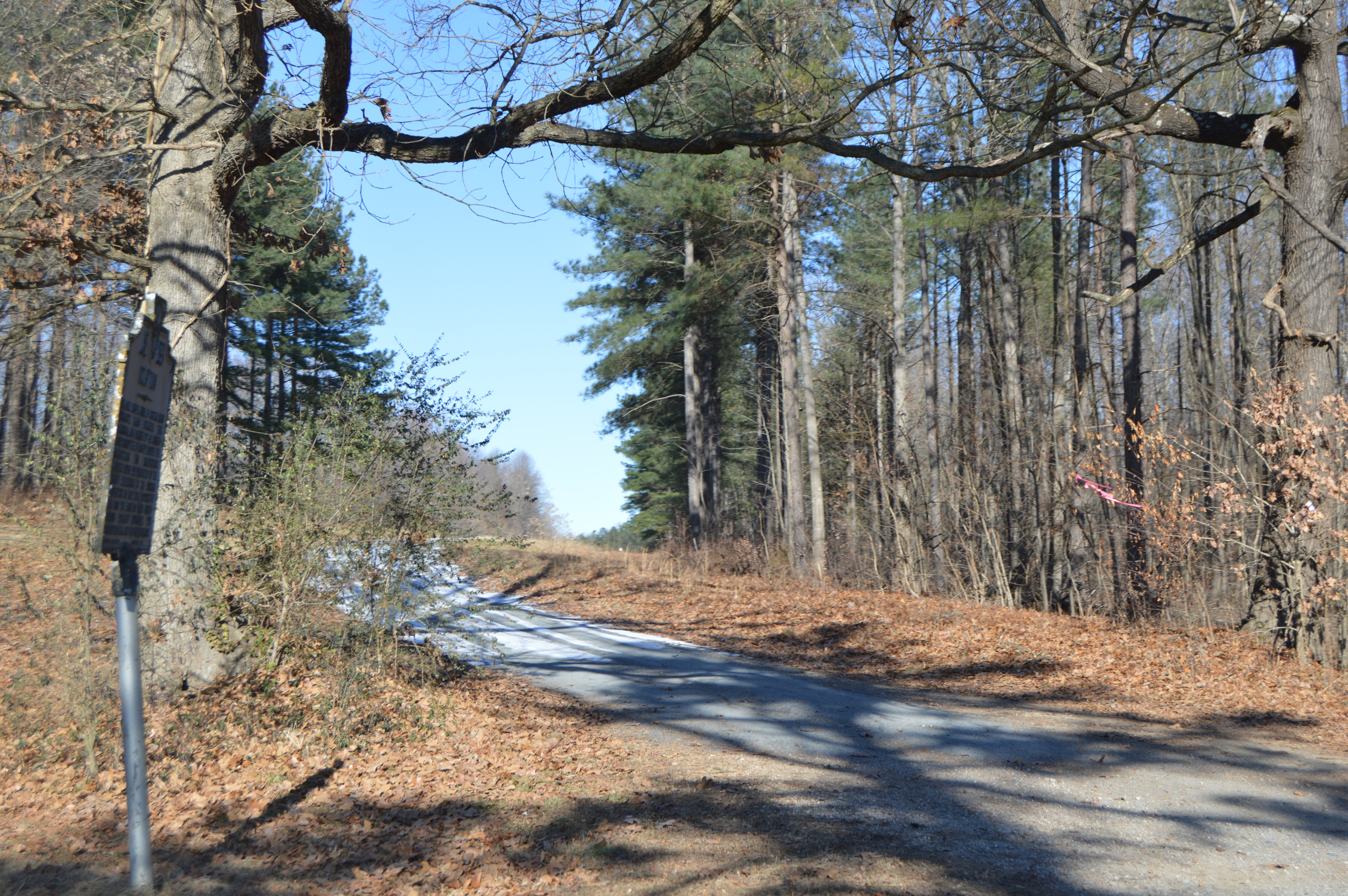
- Entrance to the property

- Location within Virginia Location within the United States
- Location: North of Hamilton off VA 690, near Hamilton, Cumberland County, Virginia
- Coordinates: 37°40′24″N 78°7′51″W
- Area: 250 acres (100 ha)
- Built: c. 1760
- Architectural style: Georgian
- NRHP reference No.: 73002007
- VLR No.: 024-0036

Significant dates
- Added to NRHP: June 19, 1973
- Designated VLR: April 17, 1973

Clifton is a historic plantation house located near Hamilton, Cumberland County, Virginia. It was built about 1760, and is a two-story, seven-bay frame dwelling in the Georgian style. It has a hipped roof and a one-bay, one-story wing on the west end. The front facade features a three-bay, one-story gable roof porch supported by elongated Tuscan order columns. It was the home of Carter Henry Harrison (~1727 – 1793/1794), who as a member of the Cumberland Committee of Safety, wrote the Instructions for Independence presented to the Virginia Convention of May 1776.

It was listed on the National Register of Historic Places in 1973.
