= Whiteville =

Whiteville may refer to a place in the United States:

- Whiteville, Louisiana
- Whiteville, North Carolina
- Whiteville, Tennessee
- Whiteville, Virginia
