= Ampthill (Cumberland County, Virginia) =

Historic house in Virginia, United States

- U.S. National Register of Historic Places
- Virginia Landmarks Register
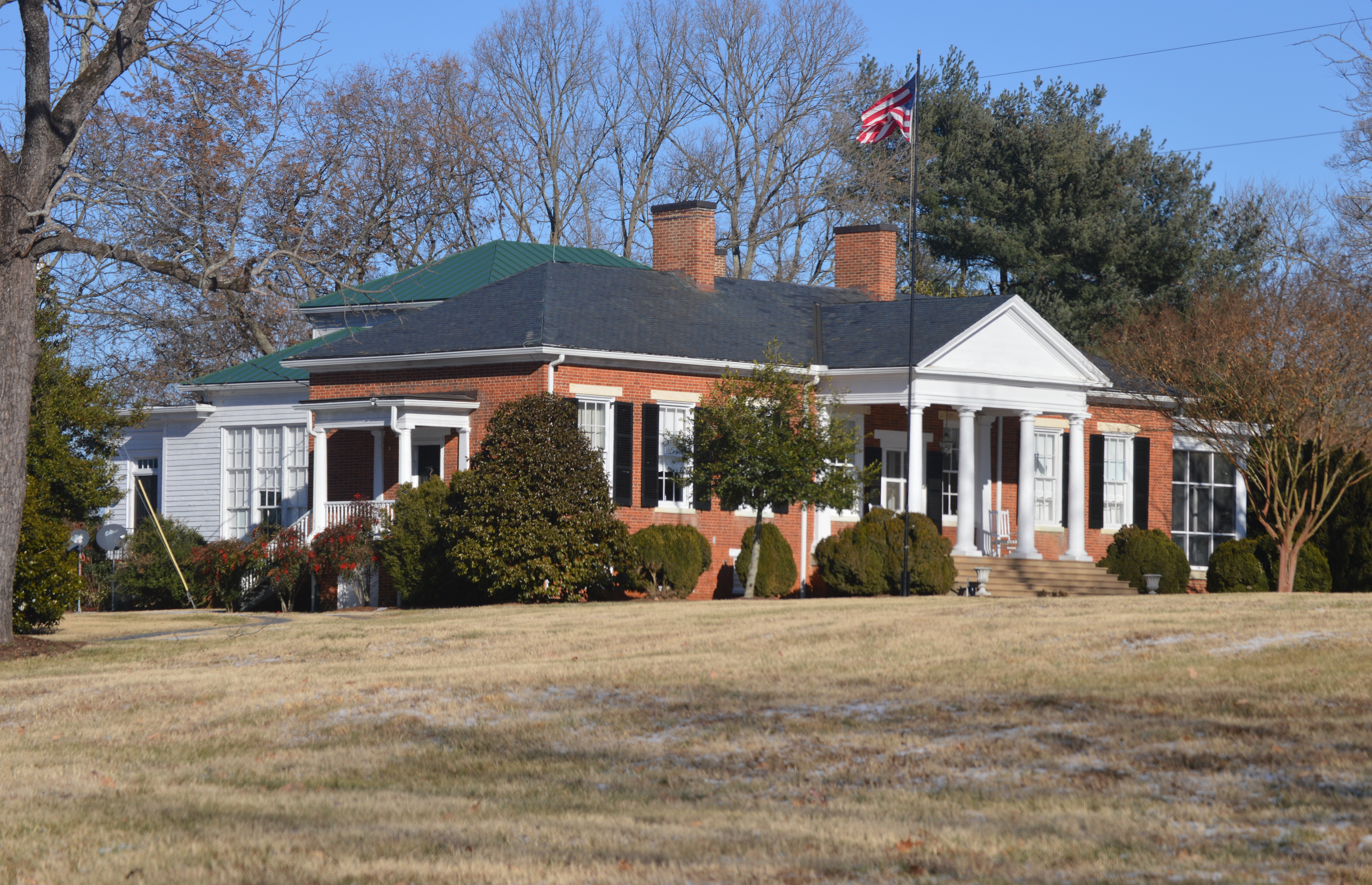
- Front, seen from the west

- Location within Virginia Location within the United States
- Location: West side of VA 602, 3 miles (4.8 km) north of the junction with VA 45, Cartersville, Virginia
- Coordinates: 37°41′34″N 78°6′13″W
- Area: 900 acres (360 ha)
- Built: 1835
- Architectural style: Early Republic, Roman Revival
- NRHP reference No.: 72001389
- VLR No.: 024-0032

Significant dates
- Added to NRHP: April 13, 1972
- Designated VLR: January 5, 1971

Ampthill is a plantation located in Cartersville, Virginia, roughly 45 minutes west of Richmond, and just over an hour south of Charlottesville. Since 1972, the property has been listed on both the National Register of Historic Places and the Virginia Landmarks Register.

== History ==
=== Site history ===
In 1714 Charles Fleming took on a land patent of 670 acres (2.7 km^{2}) with the intent to cultivate it. The land, however, "lapsed" and in 1722 was granted to Thomas Randolph. This was later included in a tract made up of 2870 acres (11.6 km^{2}), which became known as "Clifton." However, this initial 670 acre (2.7 km^{2}) tract would form "The Fork," named after its location at the confluence of the James and Willis Rivers. In 1724, Randolph sold "The Fork" to Robert "King" Carter, then the wealthiest landowner in Virginia.

In his will dated 22 August 1726, King Carter willed the 2870 acre (11.6 km^{2}) tract to his then-unborn grandson, stipulating that the child carry the Carter name. Some time later, Anne Carter and Major Benjamin Harrison of Berkeley Plantation, christened a son, Carter Henry, who upon reaching legal age became the owner of the property known as "Clifton" in Cumberland County, Virginia.

After graduating law school and beginning his legal practice, Carter Henry Harrison I moved to Clifton.There, he wrote the Cumberland Resolutions, which were presented from the steps of the Effingham Tavern. These and similar resolutions were later incorporated into the Virginia Resolutions, which formed a basis for the Declaration of Independence, written by Harrison's nephew, Thomas Jefferson. Carter Henry Harrison also served in the Virginia House of Delegates (1782–1787). Shortly before that service, Carter Henry Harrison settle his third son, Randolph Harrison, at Ampthill. Carter Henry Harrison's last will and testament, admitted to probate in 1793, confirmed Randolph as the owner of Clifton, and The Fork's owner as his brother Robert. However, financial problems caused Robert to sell The Fork to Shadrack Vaughan in 1804.

=== Ampthill ===
Around 1815, Randolph Harrison repurchased the Fork (still a clapboard structure), and began renovating the adjacent manor house. Randolph called upon his cousin, Thomas Jefferson, to design the brick addition that exists today. These plans survive today on file with the University of Virginia. The addition began in 1835 and was completed in 1837, and the structure was renamed "Ampthill." The two "houses" were separate for a number of years until a one-story passageway was built to connect them. Meanwhile, Randolp Harrison continued his father's tradition of public service by succeeding George W. Crump as one of Cumberland County's representatives in the Virginia House of Delegates in 1825, and won re-election once.

Hard times and poor planning saw Ampthill pass from family member to family member over the years, finally falling out of the family's hands in 1923. Ampthill was then purchased by J. Rodgers and I. M. Baker, but their mortgage was ultimately foreclosed and the property then purchased by Frank Baber in 1933. This sale was never officially recorded, so Inez M. Baker, William Abernathy Baker and Irving Marshall Baker purchased the home from the Federal Land Bank in Baltimore and Frank and Mary Tyler Baber in 1936. The house was then sold to Dorothy Des Leal Neville and John Neville, who defaulted. Ampthill and the existing land was then auctioned and purchased by Thomas G. Hardy and Andrew E. Godsey in 1952. In November of that year, the Rea family purchased the home from the Hardys and the Godseys. The Rea family lived at Ampthill for a number of years and sold the home in 1986 to the Saunders family, who were descended from the Harrison line that originally lived at Ampthill.

The Saunders later moved from the property and in 1998, the property was purchased by George Costen of Charlottesville. Beginning in 1999 and for a number of years that followed, Ampthill went under a major historic restoration, which included a near reconstruction of one of the outbuildings, which served as a garage for the Rea family for a number of years.

== Current status ==
Ampthill was listed on the National Register of Historic Places in 1972. It is currently operated as a bed and breakfast and enjoys the prestige of being the only privately owned Jeffersonian property in Virginia. Her windows are the original glass. Ampthill exists today on 60 acres (240,000 m^{2}) of the original 2870 acres (11.6 km^{2}), is the home to 40 head of cattle and includes the manor house, four outbuildings and the barn, which dates to 1920, by far the youngest standing structure on the property.
