= Tombstone of Charles Irving Thornton =

United States historic place

- Charles Irving Thornton Tombstone
- U.S. National Register of Historic Places
- Virginia Landmarks Register
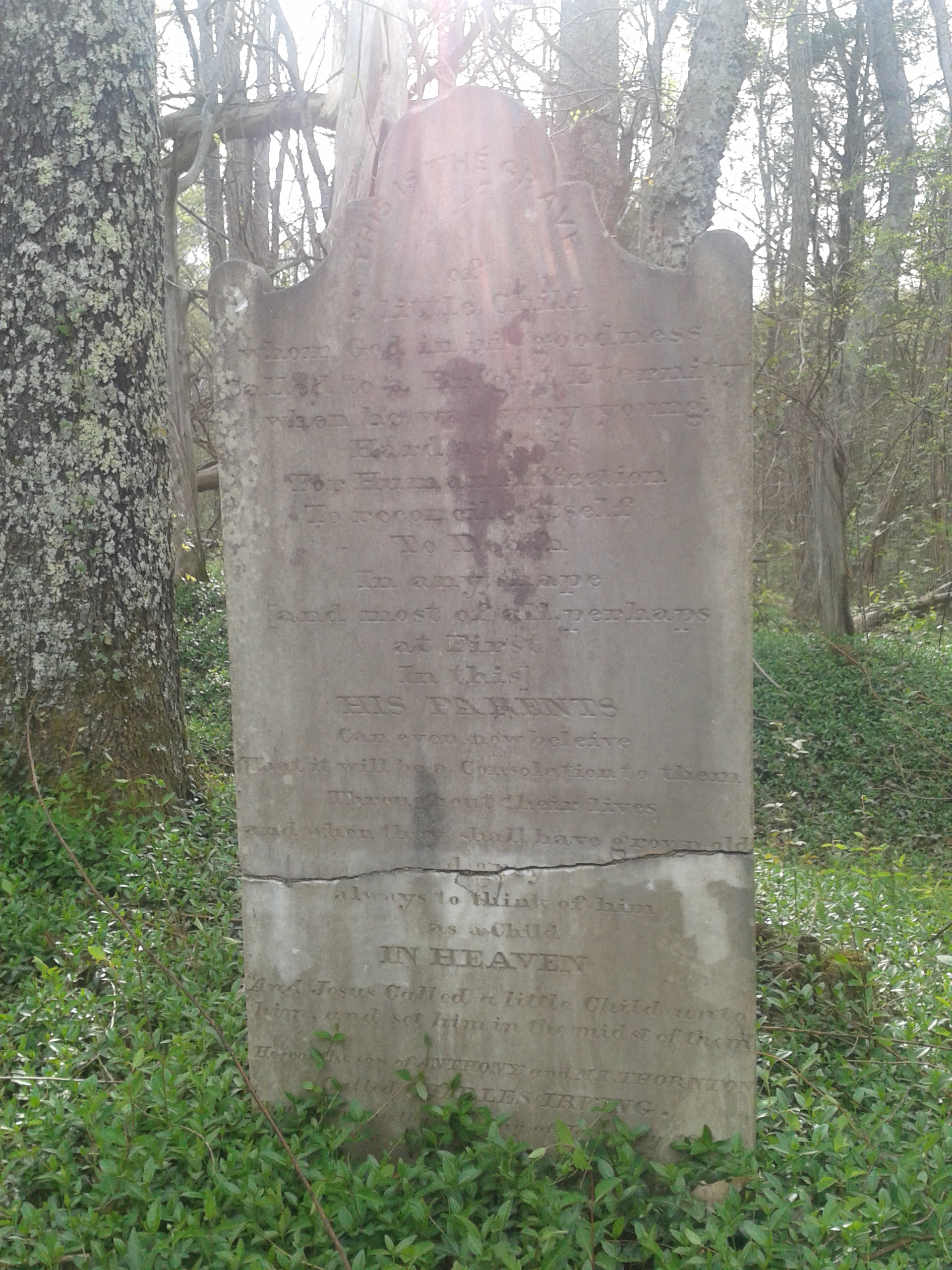
- A closeup view of the tombstone, seen in April, 2017

- Location within Virginia Location within the United States
- Location: West of Cumberland, off Oak Hill Forest Rd., Cumberland State Forest, near Cumberland, Cumberland County, Virginia
- Coordinates: 37°29′37″N 78°18′52″W
- Built: 1842
- NRHP reference No.: 80004186
- VLR No.: 024-0054

Significant dates
- Added to NRHP: November 25, 1980
- Designated VLR: June 17, 1980

Charles Irving Thornton (January 20, 1841 – March 12, 1842) was an American infant from the state of Virginia. His tombstone, located in Cumberland State Forest in Cumberland County, Virginia, is listed on the Virginia Landmarks Register and the National Register of Historic Places as one of only two gravestones in the world, and the only one in the United States, known to exist with an epitaph by Charles Dickens. (Note: The other is on the grave of Mary Hogarth.)

== History ==
Charles Irving Thornton was the son of Anthony and M. I. Thornton of Cumberland County. He died on March 12, 1842, at the age of 13 months and 19 days. A Dr. Deane was attending to the child, and upon his death was moved to write to Dickens to request an epitaph to be placed on the child's grave. Dickens had recently visited Virginia as part of his tour of the United States, but by mid-March had moved on to Ohio. The author's reasons for complying with the doctor's request remain unclear, especially given the extreme distaste that he expressed toward Virginia's continued economic dependence on slavery; to explain his possible motivations, some historians have attempted to establish a genealogical link between Dickens, the Thorntons, and Washington Irving.

Thornton's grave may still be visited today; it is in a difficult-to-find area of the state forest, but park rangers are willing to direct people to the site.

== Epitaph ==
The epitaph was edited slightly from the one provided by Dickens. It reads:

THIS IS THE GRAVE

of
a Little Child
whom God in his goodness
Called to a Bright Eternity
when he was very young.
Hard as it is
For Human Affection
To reconcile itself
To Death
In any shape
[and most of all, perhaps
at First
In this]
HIS PARENTS
Can even now believe
That it will be a Consolation to them
Throughout their lives
and when they shall have grown old
and grey
always to think of him
as a Child
IN HEAVEN
"And Jesus Called a little Child unto
him, and set him in the midst of them."
He was the son of ANTHONY and M.I. THORNTON
Called CHARLES IRVING.
He was born on the 20th day of January 1841,
and he died on the 12th day of March 1842.
Having lived only 13 months and 19 days.
