= William Fleming (judge) =

American judge (1736–1824)

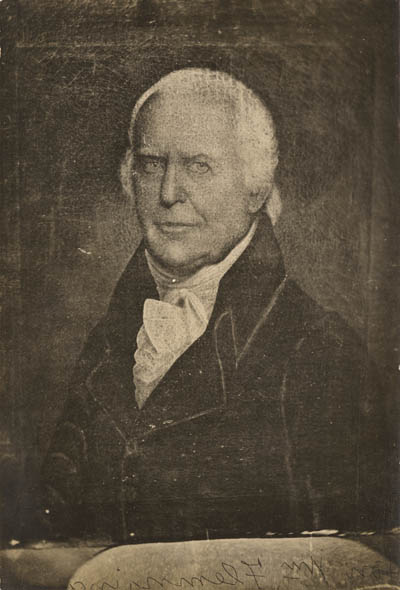
- Portrait, c. 1820

3rd Chief Justice of Virginia
- In office July 30, 1809 – February 15, 1824
- Preceded by: Peter Lyons
- Succeeded by: Francis T. Brooke

Justice of the Virginia Supreme Court
- In office June 20, 1789 – February 15, 1824
- Appointed by: Beverley Randolph

Member of the Virginia House of Delegates representing Chesterfield County
- In office May 1, 1780 – 1781 Serving with John Mayo
- Preceded by: Jerman Baker
- Succeeded by: Francis Goode

Member of the Continental Congress representing Virginia
- In office 1779–1781

Member of the Virginia House of Delegates representing Powhatan County
- In office October 20, 1777 – 1777 Serving with John Mayo Jr.
- Preceded by: position created
- Succeeded by: Littleberry Mayo

Member of the Virginia House of Delegates representing Cumberland County
- In office October 1, 1776 – 1777 Serving with John Mayo
- Preceded by: position created
- Succeeded by: Joseph Carrington

Member of the Virginia House of Burgesses representing Cumberland County
- In office 1772–1776 Serving with John Mayo
- Preceded by: Alexander Trent
- Succeeded by: position abolished

Personal details
- Born: July 6, 1736 Cumberland County, Virginia
- Died: February 15, 1824 (aged 87) Summerville Plantation, Chesterfield County, Virginia
- Education: College of William & Mary
- Profession: Lawyer, judge, politician

Judge William Fleming (July 6, 1736 – February 15, 1824) was an American lawyer, jurist and political figure from Cumberland County, Virginia. He is often confused with his contemporary, Colonel William Fleming, who was born and educated in Scotland, lived in Staunton considerably to the west, briefly served as Governor of Virginia during the American Revolution, and served in the state senate representing Botetourt, Montgomery and Kentucky Counties in this same period.

== Early life and education ==
Born to the former Mary Bolling and her husband John Fleming (a planter and later judge), Fleming received his education at The College of William & Mary.

== Career ==
Admitted to the bar, Fleming started practicing law before the county courts (as Goochland County split several times as discussed below) and was selected as an assistant prosecutor during the American Revolutionary War. He was also a planter, and operated his plantations using enslaved labor. After the various splits of Goochland County during the conflict, his main plantation, Summervelle, was in Chesterfield County by 1787. In the tax census that year, Fleming owned 19 slaves 16 years old and older, as well as 28 enslaved children, nine horses, 42 cattle as well as a 4-wheeled carriage there. William and Charles Fleming also owned 7 adult slaves, three enslaved children and 7 horses and 28 cattle in Goochland County in 1787, as well as three cattle in Powhatan County.

Meanwhile, in 1772 Cumberland County voters elected Fleming as one of their representatives in the House of Burgesses, as he began repeating the political career of his father John Fleming. He continued in that part-time position alongside fellow planter John Mayo until Governor Lord Dunmore terminated that body as the revolutionary war began. Voters then elected and re-elected the pair to the five Virginia Revolutionary Conventions. When the new state government of Virginia was instituted, Fleming and Mayo went back to Williamsburg as a member of the first House of Delegates and was also re-elected, but chose instead to become deputy attorney for the new Commonwealth, so Joseph Carrington succeeded to the legislative position.

In that session, Powhatan County had been formed from Goochland County, and both Mayo's and Fleming's plantations were in the new county, whose voters elected them as their representatives. After another split created Chesterfield County, and Fleming returned from the Continental Congress as discussed below, he won election from that new county for a single term in 1780-1781, again alongside young John Mayo.

On December 10, 1778, Fleming was elected a member of Continental Congress, but only reported there in April 1779. In September, he took a leave of absence and returned to Virginia and the House of Delegates. In 1781, he was elected and began serving as a judge of the Virginia general court.

Governor Beverley Randolph subsequently appointed Fleming to the Supreme Court of Appeals. When the court was reorganized in 1788, he was one of the five judges chosen for the new court. He became president and chief justice of the Court in 1809, a position he held until his death. His most famous case there may have involved glebe lands.

== Summerville ==
In 1777, William Fleming moved from his plantation, Mt. Pleasant, in Cumberland County (changed to Powhatan County in that year), to neighboring Chesterfield County where he had bought another plantation called Summerville from Robert Moseley. This was to be his home for the remainder of his life. During his ownership, Summerville's land acreage increased from 528 acres to 906 acres. In 1781, while Richmond was being raided by Benedict Arnold, then Governor Thomas Jefferson stayed at Summerville for a night with his college friend William Fleming. Both Jefferson and Fleming had attended the College of William & Mary. Summerville was a working plantation in Virginia and as such, it had a number of slaves attending to it. In the 1820 United States census, William Fleming is reported as having 13 slaves, 9 males and 4 females. Many of these slaves died at Summerville and were buried in the burial grounds. On February 15, 1824, Judge Fleming died at his house at Summerville and was buried there as well. Summerville continued to be a prosperous plantation up until the end of the Civil War, at which point all of the slaves were emancipated. This caused the plantation to go to ruin and it appears that the Summerville house was abandoned. In the late 1980s most of the Summerville tract was built over by a housing development, including the area where the house would have stood and most likely the burial grounds of the slaves and William Fleming.

== Personal life ==
Fleming married Elizabeth, the daughter of Col. John Champe, on October 5, 1766. The couple had several daughters.

== Death and legacy ==
Fleming died at Sumervelle on February 15, 1824. 1824.
