= John Fleming (judge) =

American judge (1697-1766)

John Fleming (November 1697 – 1766) was a judge in Cumberland County, Virginia who served in the Virginia House of Burgesses for more than a decade, working with John Robinson and Peyton Randolph.

== Family background and personal life ==
Fleming was born in November 1697 in Henrico County, Virginia, to Charles Fleming and Susanna Tarleton.

He married Mary Bolling, daughter of John Bolling, on January 20, 1727, in Chesterfield, Virginia. They had several children, including sons John, Thomas, William, Richard, and Charles, and daughters Mary and Caroline. Through their mother, his children were descendants of Pocahontas.

His legacy continued through his son William, who later succeeded him as Cumberland County's representative in the House of Burgesses.

== Judicial and legislative roles ==
In 1764, he worked alongside Patrick Henry, George Johnston, and Robert Munford to draft the Virginia Stamp Act Resolutions, a significant precursor to American revolutionary sentiment.

Fleming played a judicial role in the John Chiswell scandal, where he ordered Chiswell's imprisonment following a controversial homicide.
