= Hawk, Virginia =

Unincorporated community in Virginia, US

Coordinates: 37°24′36″N 78°21′22″W

Hawk is an unincorporated community in Cumberland County, in the U.S. state of Virginia.
