= Cumberland County Courthouse (Virginia) =

Historic courthouse in Virginia, US

- U.S. National Register of Historic Places
- U.S. Historic district – Contributing property
- Virginia Landmarks Register
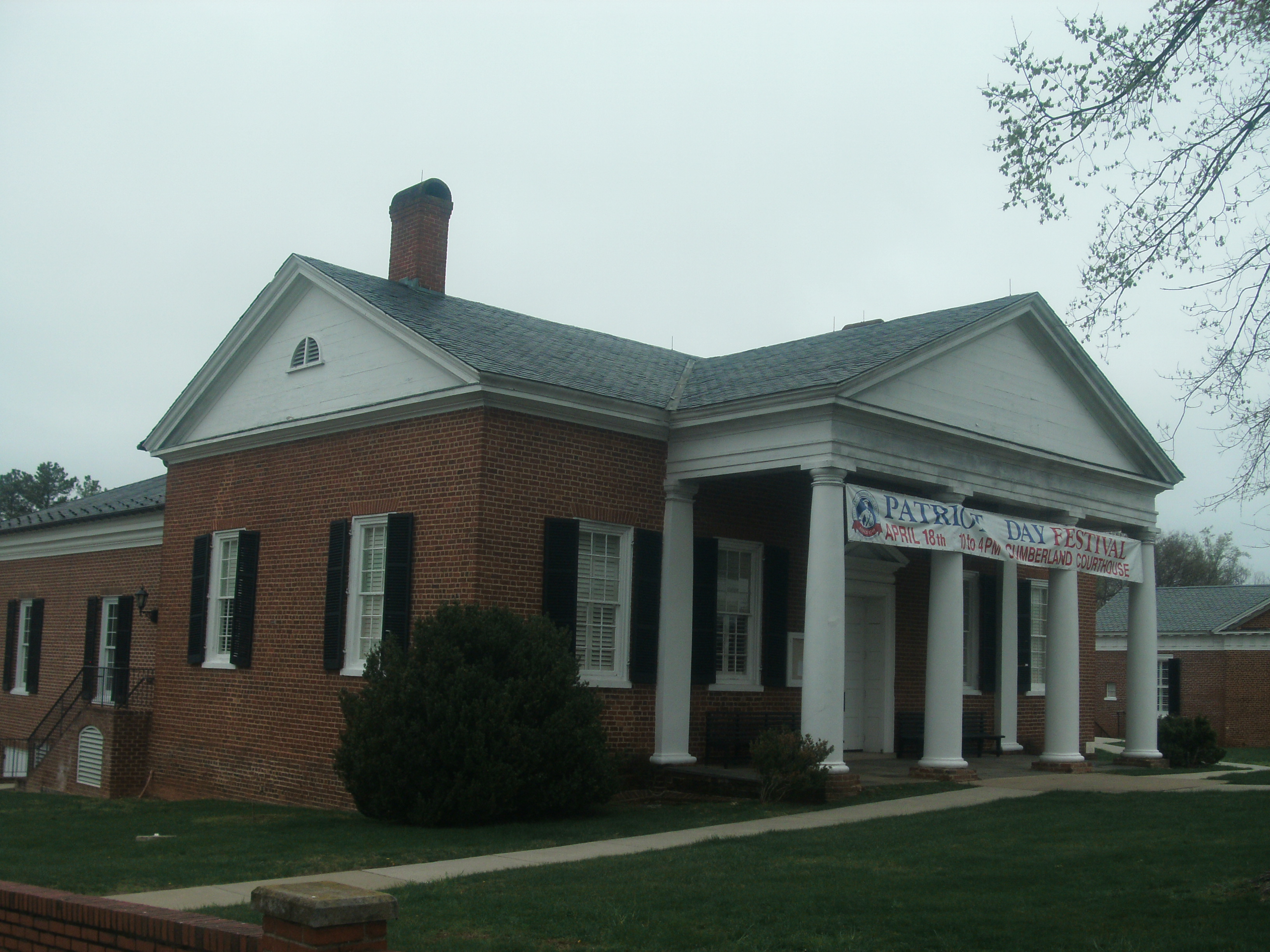
- Cumberland County Courthouse, taken in 2015

- Location within Virginia Location within the United States
- Interactive map showing the location of Cumberland County Courthouse
- Location: US 60, N side, at jct. with VA 600, Cumberland, Virginia
- Coordinates: 37°29′55″N 78°14′41″W
- Area: 1.5 acres (0.61 ha)
- Built: 1818
- Architects: Howard, William A.
- Architectural style: Early Republic, Early Classical Revival
- NRHP reference No.: 94001178
- VLR No.: 024-0005

Significant dates
- Added to NRHP: September 30, 1994
- Designated VLR: August 17, 1994, May 15, 2007

The Cumberland County Courthouse is a historic courthouse building located at Cumberland, Cumberland County, Virginia. It was built by Dabney Cosby (c. 1793-August, 1862), a master builder for Thomas Jefferson, in 1818. It is a brick, one-story, rectangular, gable-roofed courthouse. The building features the Tuscan order throughout and a tetrastyle portico. Also included are the contributing small, brick, one-story clerks office; the brick, two-story, gable-roofed former jail; and Confederate Civil War monument (1901).

It was listed on the National Register of Historic Places in 1994. It is included in the Cumberland Court House Historic District
