= Summerville Plantation =

Summerville
- Interactive map of the Summerville area

General information
- Status: Demolished
- Coordinates: 37.5213°N 77.6801°W
- Year built: c. 1760s

Summerville Plantation was a farm in northwestern Chesterfield County, Virginia. Established around the 1760s by Robert Moseley, Summerville was home to many prominent Chesterfield families until its decay following the American Civil War. In the late 1900s the tract was built over by new housing developments.

== History ==
The Summerville site was originally part of a 17,653-acre tract granted by the British crown to John Tullit. From 1705 to 1760, the tract was owned by numerous people with the names of Page, Digges, Cary, Price, and Lacy. In 1760, the original 200-acre parcel was bought by Robert Moseley (1732–1804) and Magdalene Guerrant Moseley (1740–1826), a young couple, from Thomas Lacy for 65 pounds. Two additional purchases in 1762 and 1763 of 228 and 100 acres, respectively, brought the total acreage of the farm to 528 acres. The Moseley's built a small house at Summerville in the early 1760s which was soon enlarged on account of the number of children they had: Thomas, Arthur, John, Magdalene, Judith, William, and Peter. The site of the Summerville house was on a ridge overlooking the Michaux Creek valley and "it is said that the westward view was unsurpassed in that area of Virginia." In 1777, Summerville was sold to Colonel William Fleming of "Mount Pleasant" in neighboring Powhatan County, while Robert, Magdalene, and their family moved to a much larger plantation in Buckingham County called "Willow Lake."

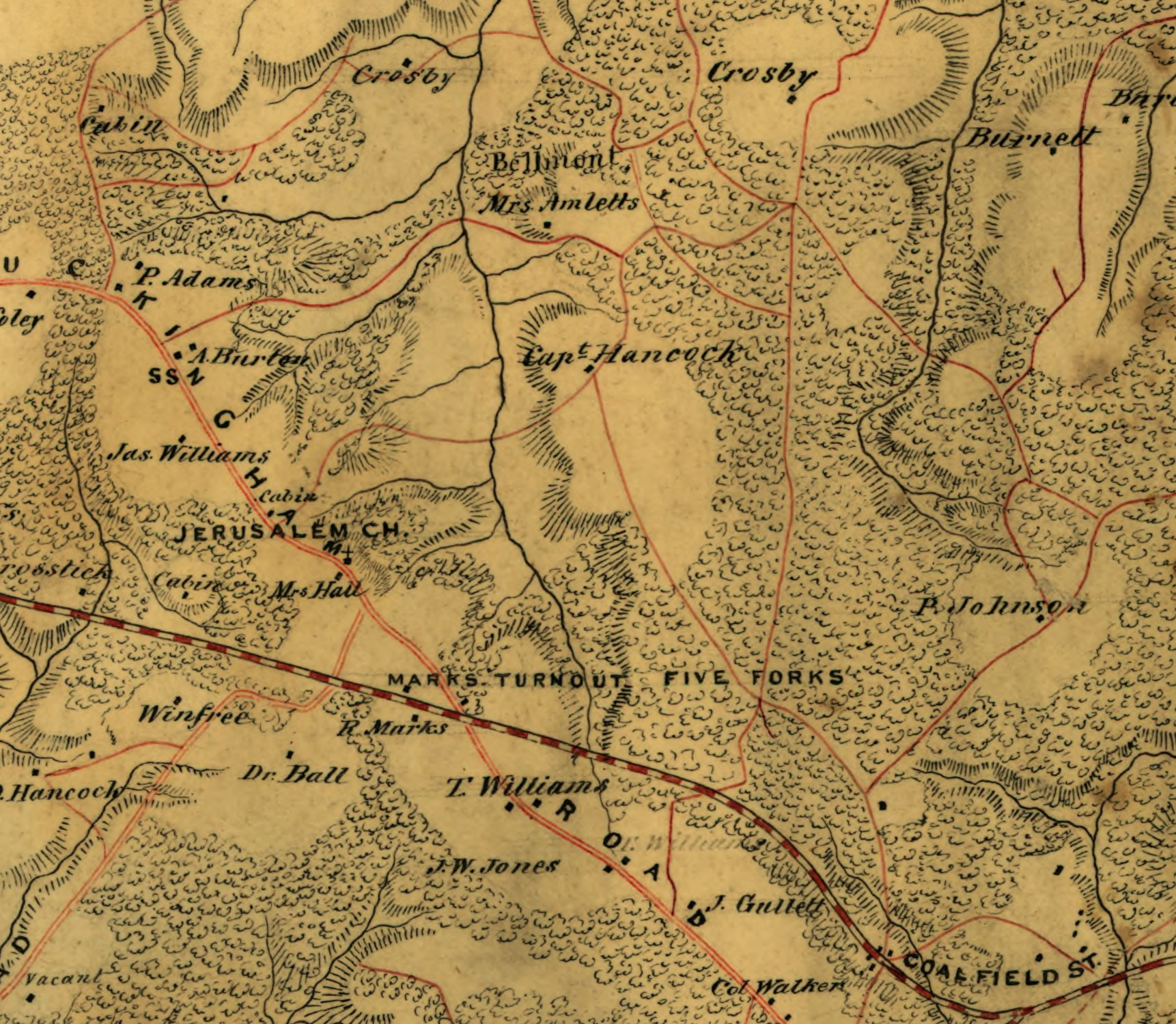
Summerville Plantation on 1864 map (noted as Capt. Hancock)

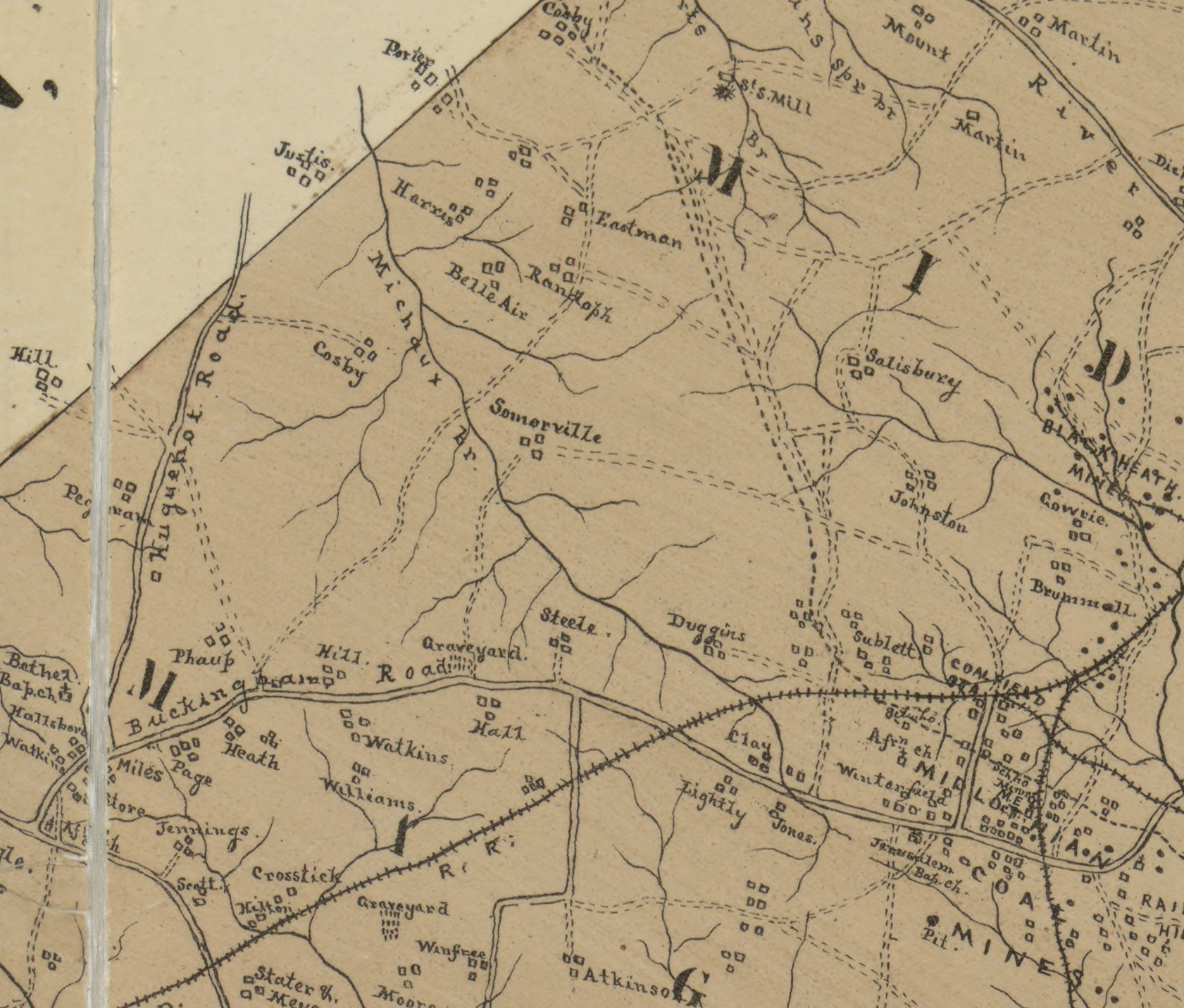
Summerville Plantation on 1888 map (noted as Somerville)

William Fleming (1736–1824) was a man with distinguished Virginia heritage. His father, John Fleming, married in 1727 Mary Bolling, daughter of John Bolling and Mary Kennon, two scions of rich and powerful tidewater Virginia families. When William was 36 years old, in 1772, he became a member of the House of Burgesses for Virginia. During the next couple decades, he was part of a group of Virginia politicians that crafted and ran the early state's government. In 1789, Fleming was chosen to be part of the new Virginia Supreme Court. He served in that duty until 1809, when he was elevated to become the chief justice of the Supreme Court of Virginia. This role took up the last 15 years of his life until his death in 1824. An interesting note about William Fleming and Summerville is that in early 1781, Thomas Jefferson, then governor of Virginia, spent a night at Summerville with Fleming while Richmond was being burned by Benedict Arnold. Fleming and Jefferson had both attended and known each other at the College of William and Mary. During Fleming's tenure at Summerville, the plantation's acreage was expanded from 528 acres to 906 acres. An 1815 tax list indicates that there were 8 horses or mules and 21 cows on the plantation. In 1820, he owned 13 slaves (9 males and 4 females). On February 15, 1824, William Fleming died at Summerville and was buried in the burial grounds there.

In 1825, Colonel Higgison Hancock (1794–1866) bought Summerville. He was the son of Rev. Francis Hancock, a Baptist preacher when it was not always safe to be one. Higgison served as High Sheriff for Chesterfield in 1846–47 and as a member of the House of Delegates in 1847–48. When Col. Hancock came to Summerville, he was not a man of great means but over time, he became one of the richest men in Chesterfield County. At the time of his purchase of the estate, he had two slaves over 16 years old. By 1830, he had 16 slaves (8 male and 8 female) and just before the Civil War he had 31 slaves over 12. He also owned two carriages, three watches, and a piano (things that were very uncommon back then except for the extremely wealthy).

Higgison and Hannah Walthall Hancock had three sons (Dr. Francis W. Hancock, Dr. William G. Hancock, and Dr. Philip S. Hancock) who all attended Jefferson Medical College and all became physicians. After the Civil War, the plantation system of farming collapsed as a result of the emancipation of the slaves and numerous plantations across the south fell into ruin, among them Summerville. Higgison Hancock died in 1866 at the Ballard House hotel in Richmond, where he was living with his son Francis. In 1885, the 786 1/2-acre Summerville was split into four lots, one of which was the "305 acre 'House Lot' containing the homestead."

In the 1900s, part of Summerville was farmed, or at least the fields were kept up. During the 1960s, the fields of Summerville were planted over with trees and in the late 1980s and early 1990s, the entire former tract north of Michaux Creek was built over by housing developments. Today, nothing remains of the once grand plantation Summerville.
