= Peter Lyons (Virginia judge) =

American judge

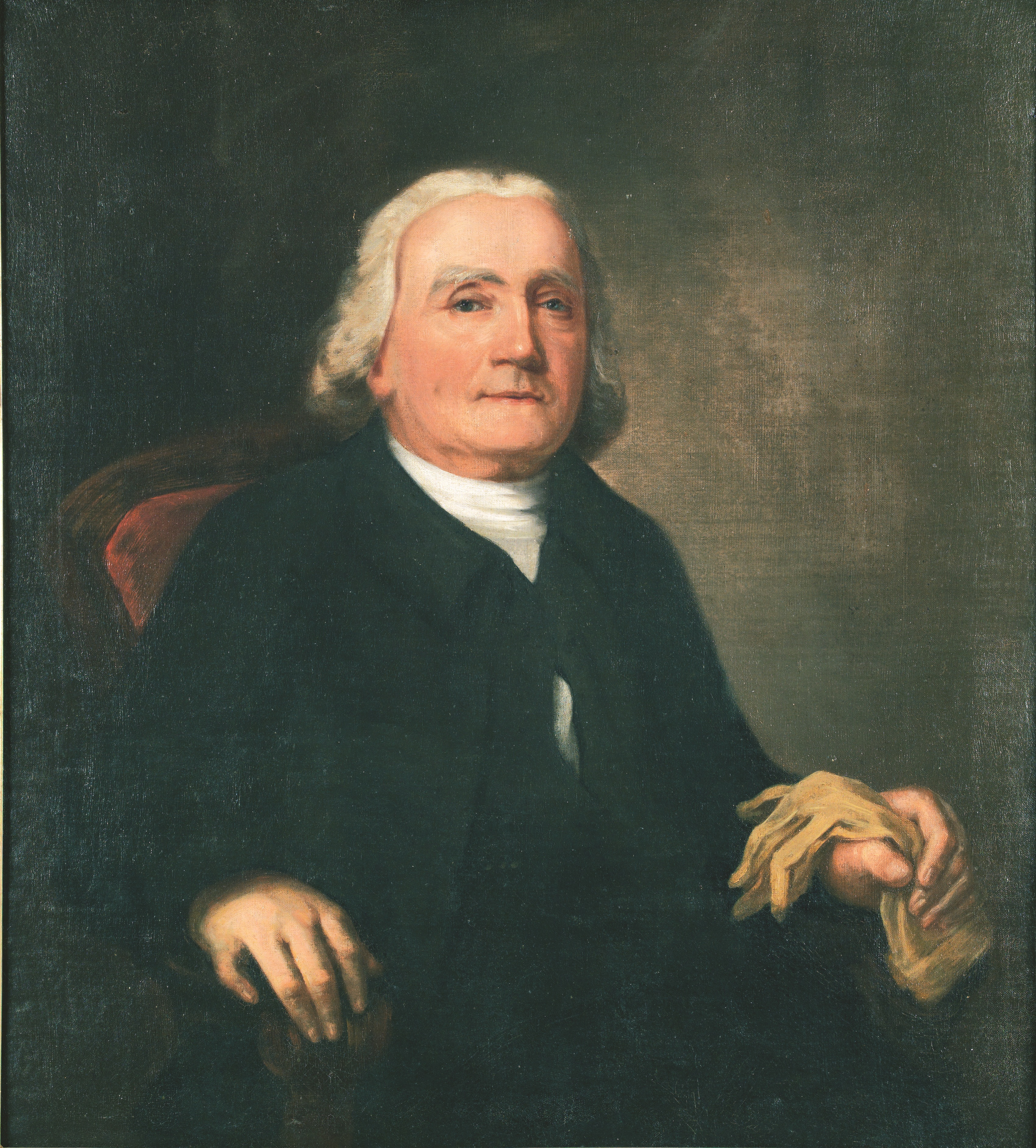
- Portrait by Thomas Sully, c. 1803

2nd Chief Justice of Virginia
- In office October 26, 1803 – July 30, 1809
- Preceded by: Edmund Pendleton
- Succeeded by: William Fleming

Justice of the Virginia Supreme Court
- In office December 24, 1788 – July 30, 1809

Personal details
- Born: 1734 Ireland
- Died: July 30, 1809 (aged 74–75) Hanover County, Virginia
- Education: Trinity College Dublin.
- Profession: Lawyer, judge

Peter Lyons (1734 – July 30, 1809) was a Virginia lawyer and judge. He was elected as one of the first justices to serve on the Virginia Court of Appeals (which later became known as the Supreme Court of Virginia), and he later became the second President and chief justice of the Court.

== Biography ==
Lyons was born in Ireland about 1734. He graduated from Trinity College Dublin. Following this, he came to King William County, Virginia, and studied law under his uncle, James Power. He was admitted to the bar on February 5, 1756, and started to practice law in the county courts.

On October 20, 1779, Lyons was elected to the general court, which made him an ex officio member of the Court of Appeals. In 1788, the Court of Appeals was reorganized and the judges, reduced to five in number, were to be elected by a joint ballot of both Houses of Assembly. The first five, elected on December 24, 1788, were Edmund Pendleton, John Blair Jr., Peter Lyons, Paul Carrington and William Fleming. Peter Lyons was elected from Hanover County. In 1789, John Blair left the Virginia Court to become a justice of the Supreme Court of the United States. This left Peter Lyons the second ranking member of the Virginia Court of Appeals, which he presided over in the absence of Pendleton. When Pendleton died in 1803, Lyons succeeded him as president, running a court with just three of the original five justices. Lyons maintained the position of president and chief justice until his death six years later in Hanover County on July 30, 1809.
