= Hillcrest, Virginia =

Unincorporated community in Virginia, United States

Coordinates: 37.48265°N 78.27416°W

Hillcrest is an unincorporated community in Cumberland County, in the U.S. state of Virginia.
