= Cartersville Historic District =

Historic district in Virginia, United States

- U.S. National Register of Historic Places
- U.S. Historic district
- Virginia Landmarks Register
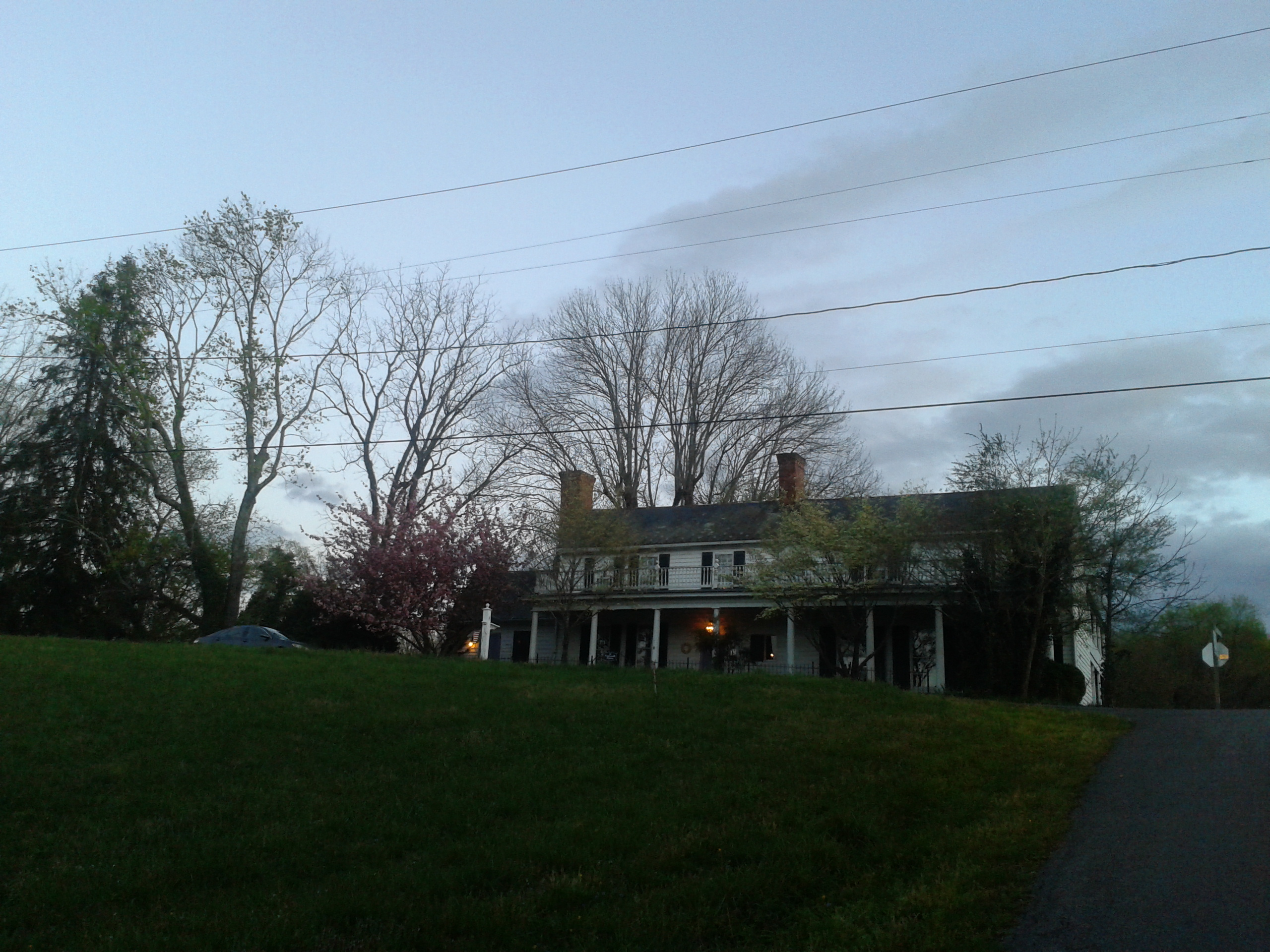
- View of the district at dusk, April 2017

- Location within Virginia Location within the United States
- Location: Roughly bounded by VA 45, VA 649 and VA 656, Cartersville, Virginia
- Coordinates: 37°40′1″N 78°5′24″W
- Area: 48 acres (19 ha)
- Architectural style: Colonial Revival, Queen Anne, Federal
- NRHP reference No.: 93000505
- VLR No.: 024-0126

Significant dates
- Added to NRHP: June 10, 1993
- Designated VLR: April 21, 1993

Cartersville Historic District is a national historic district located at Cartersville, Cumberland County, Virginia. It encompasses 51 contributing buildings and 2 contributing sites in the village of Cartersville. Most of the buildings date to the turn of the 20th century, with a number of late-18th- and 19th-century dwellings and former taverns, two churches, a few commercial buildings, a post office, and a former school. Notable buildings include the Deanery (1780s), Glaser House (1790s), Baptist Parsonage (1790s), Cartersville Tavern (c. 1810), Cartersville Baptist Church (c. 1906), St. Catherine's Catholic Church (1910), Cartersville Methodist Episcopal Church (1883), Cartersville Post Office (1910), Cartersville Bank (c. 1900), Culbertson House (c. 1910), H. T. Harrison House (c. 1800, c. 1900), and W. E. Robinson House (c. 1909), Newstead Manor (c. 1920).

It was added to the National Register of Historic Places in 1993.
