= Cartersville Bridge =

- U.S. National Register of Historic Places
- Virginia Landmarks Register
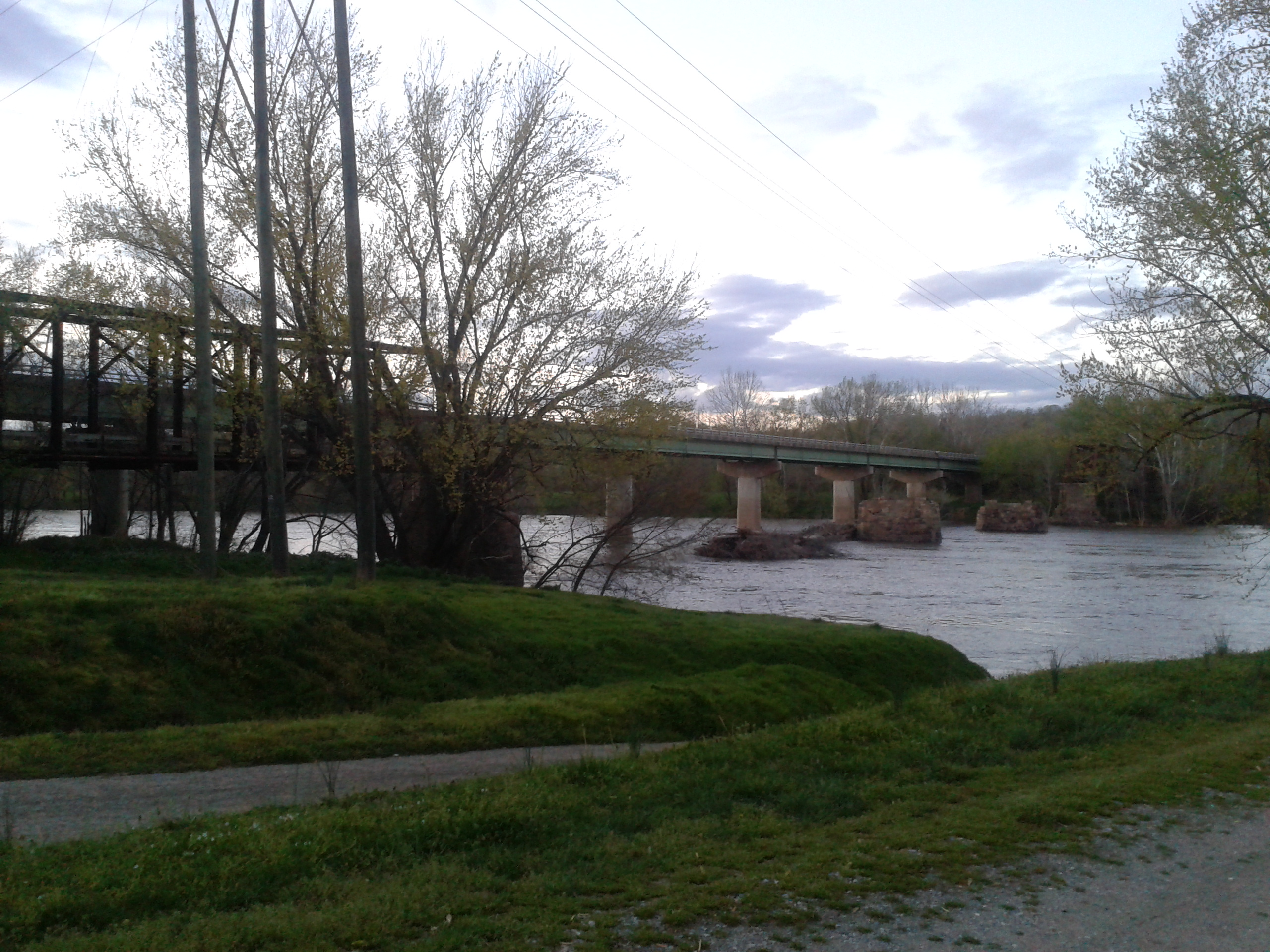
- View of the bridge at dusk, April 2017

- Location within Virginia Location within the United States
- Location: VA 45 over James River, Cartersville
- Coordinates: 37°40′12″N 78°5′14″W
- Area: less than one acre
- Built: 1822, 1883-1884
- Architectural style: Pratt truss
- NRHP reference No.: 72001390
- VLR No.: 024-0053

Significant dates
- Added to NRHP: September 14, 1972
- Designated VLR: March 21, 1972

Cartersville Bridge is a historic bridge located near Cartersville, Cumberland County, Virginia. The original bridge was constructed in 1822, and its five stone piers of rough cut ashlar and rubble and two stone abutments remain. Atop them is a superstructure constructed in 1883-84 of heavy timber members with cast-iron connections arranged to form a truss configuration based on the Pratt truss. The bridge is composed of six spans with an end-to-end length of 843 feet (257 m).

The bridge was listed on the National Register of Historic Places in 1972.

== See also ==
- List of bridges documented by the Historic American Engineering Record in Virginia
- List of bridges on the National Register of Historic Places in Virginia
