= Cumberland County Courthouse (Tennessee) =

- Cumberland County Courthouses
- U.S. National Register of Historic Places
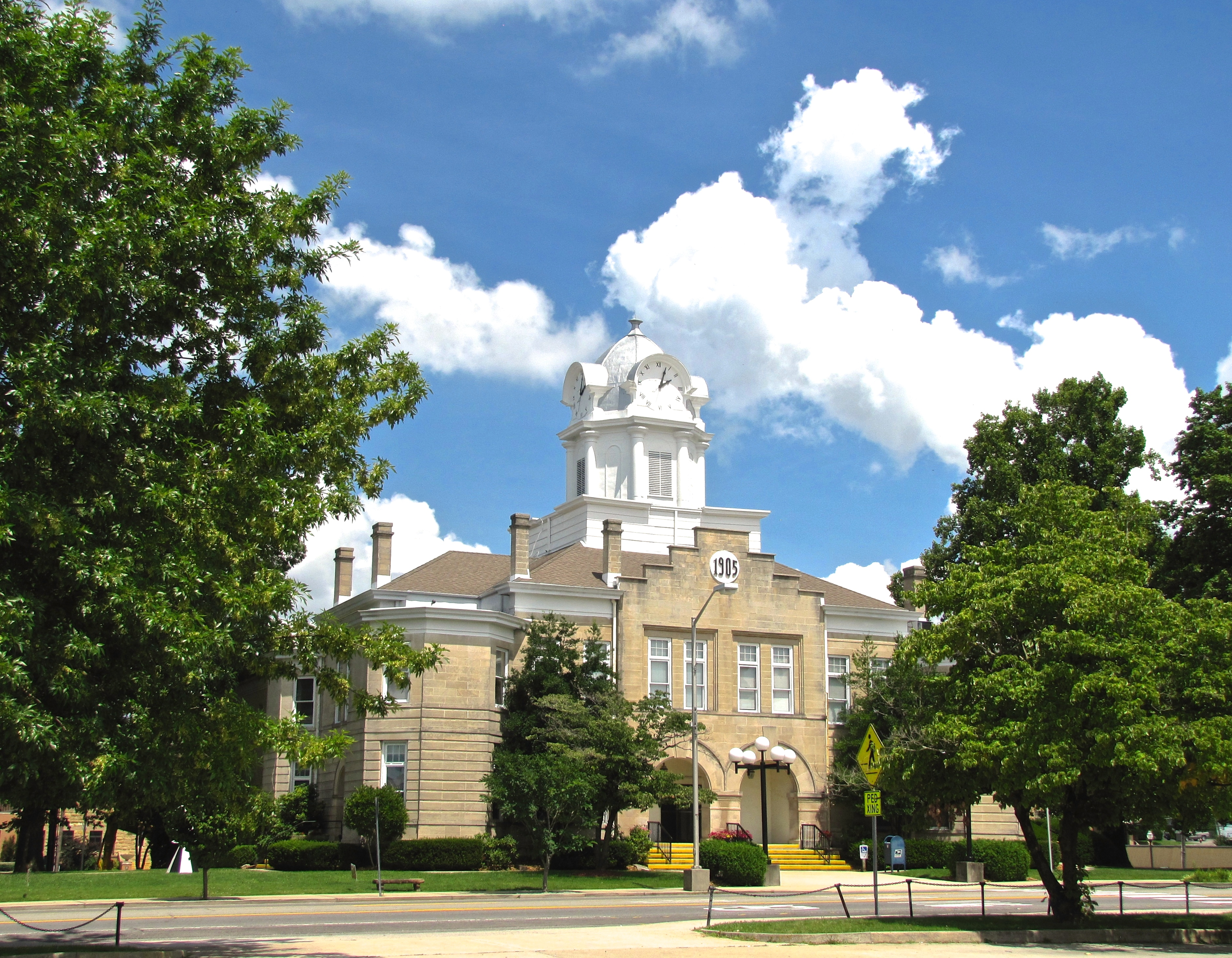

- Location within Tennessee Location within the United States
- Location: Main Street, Crossville, Tennessee
- Coordinates: 35°56′53″N 85°01′37″W
- Area: 0.7 acres (0.28 ha)
- Built: 1905
- Built by: Lewman and Company
- Architect: W. Chamberlin & Co.
- NRHP reference No.: 80003783
- Added to NRHP: June 17, 1980

The Cumberland County Courthouse is a historic building in Crossville, Tennessee. It did serve as the courthouse Cumberland County until 2009 when a new justice center was built. It was built with sandstone from the county, and completed in 1905. It was the third courthouse built for the county, the first one dating back to 1857 and the second one to 1886.

The building was designed by W. Charmberlin and Company, an architectural firm from Birmingham, Alabama. It has been listed on the National Register of Historic Places since June 17, 1980.
