= Whiteville, Virginia =

Unincorporated community in Virginia, United States

Coordinates: 37°36′09″N 78°10′03″W

Whiteville is an unincorporated community in Cumberland County, in the U.S. state of Virginia.
