= Morven (Cartersville, Virginia) =

Historic house in Virginia, United States

- U.S. National Register of Historic Places
- Virginia Landmarks Register
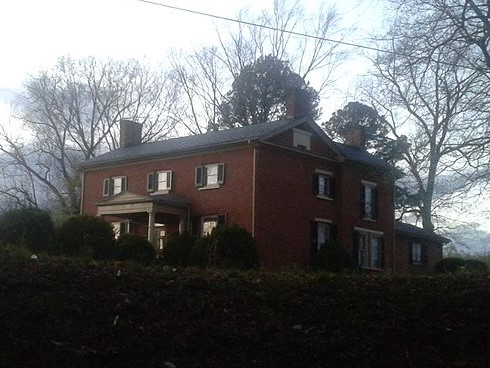
- Morven at dusk, April 2017

- Location within Virginia Location within the United States
- Location: VA 45, 0.5 miles (0.80 km) south of Cartersville, near Cartersville
- Coordinates: 37°39′33″N 78°5′57″W
- Area: 7 acres (2.8 ha)
- Built: 1820, 1885
- Architectural style: Federal, Early Classical Revival
- NRHP reference No.: 90002014
- VLR No.: 024-0027

Significant dates
- Added to NRHP: December 28, 1990
- Designated VLR: December 12, 1989

Morven is a historic home located near Cartersville, Cumberland County, Virginia. It was built in 1820, and is a two-story, three-bay, central hall plan brick dwelling in the Federal style. The property was used as a retreat for the Harrison and Randolph families until 1870.

It was listed on the National Register of Historic Places in 1990.
