= Hamilton High School (Cartersville, Virginia) =

- U.S. National Register of Historic Places
- Virginia Landmarks Register
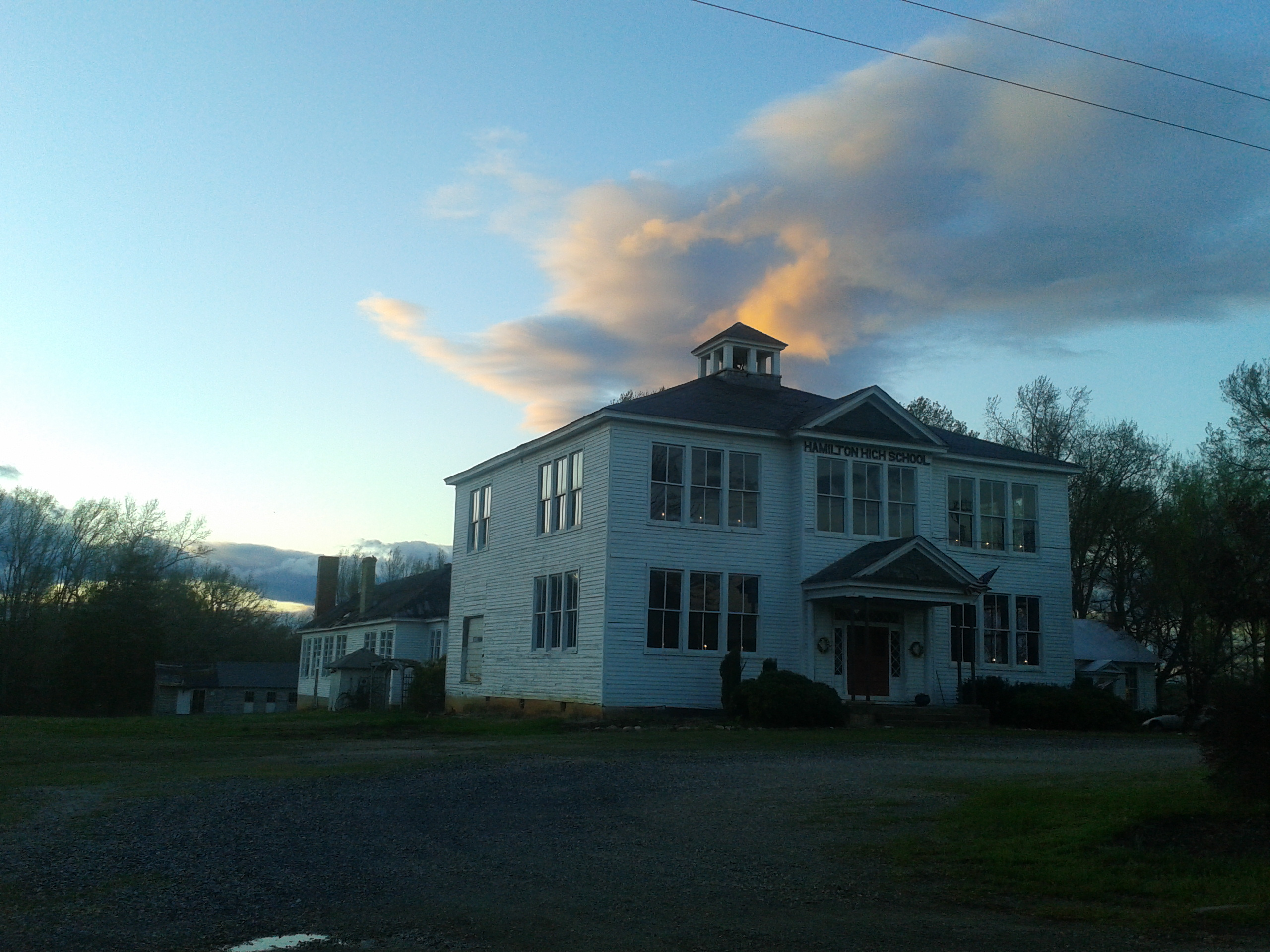
- Hamilton High School at dusk, April 2017

- Location within Virginia Location within the United States
- Location: 1925 Cartersville Rd., Cartersville, Virginia
- Coordinates: 37°39′30″N 78°7′39″W
- Area: 5 acres (2.0 ha)
- Built: 1910
- Architect: Dickenson, C.W. (Superintendent)
- Architectural style: Classical Revival
- NRHP reference No.: 07001136
- VLR No.: 024-0105

Significant dates
- Added to NRHP: October 31, 2007
- Designated VLR: September 5, 2007

Hamilton High School is a historic high school building complex located at Cartersville, Cumberland County, Virginia, USA.

== History ==
It was constructed in 1910 and is a two-story wood-frame building, constructed in a local adaptation of the Classical Revival style. It has a hipped roof topped by a bell tower / cupola and is two bays deep and three bays wide, with an exterior footprint of 50 feet by 57 feet. An auditorium annex was added about 1925. A second annex, an agricultural classroom building now referred to as "the cannery" was added to the property about 1930, and the Wayside School (c. 1879), a one-room schoolhouse that was moved to the property from the vicinity of nearby Sportsmen's Lake between about 1935 and 1945.

It was listed on the National Register of Historic Places in 2007.
