= Hamilton, Cumberland County, Virginia =

Unincorporated community in Virginia, United States

Coordinates: 37°39′33″N 78°07′30″W

Hamilton is an unincorporated community in Cumberland County, in the U.S. state of Virginia.
