= Cartersville, Cumberland County, Virginia =

Unincorporated community in Virginia, United States

Cartersville, Virginia
- Unincorporated community
- Location within Virginia Location within the United States
- Coordinates: 37°40′03″N 78°05′18″W
- Country: United States
- State: Virginia
- County: Cumberland
- Elevation: 259 ft (79 m)
- Time zone: UTC-5 (Eastern (EST))
  - Summer (DST): UTC-4 (EDT)
- Area code: Area code
- GNIS ID: 1492721

Cartersville is an unincorporated community in Cumberland County, in the U.S. state of Virginia.

Cartersville formed around the James River and Kanawha Canal. An 1855 gazetteer described it as having "1 church, several stores, and about 50 dwellings."

A number of properties on the National Register of Historic Places are located in and around Cartersville; among these are the plantation house Ampthill, the Cartersville Bridge, Hamilton High School, and Morven, an historic home, as well as the Cartersville Historic District.

== Climate ==
Climate is characterized by relatively high temperatures and evenly distributed precipitation throughout the year. The Köppen Climate Classification subtype for this climate is "Cfa" (Humid Subtropical Climate).

Climate data for Cartersville, Virginia
Month	Jan	Feb	Mar	Apr	May	Jun	Jul	Aug	Sep	Oct	Nov	Dec	Year
Mean daily maximum °C (°F)	8 (47)	9 (49)	15 (59)	21 (69)	26 (78)	29 (84)	31 (88)	30 (86)	27 (81)	22 (71)	16 (60)	9 (49)	20 (68)
Mean daily minimum °C (°F)	−4 (25)	−4 (25)	1 (33)	6 (42)	11 (52)	16 (61)	18 (65)	18 (64)	14 (57)	7 (44)	1 (34)	−3 (27)	7 (44)
Average precipitation mm (inches)	79 (3.1)	69 (2.7)	89 (3.5)	86 (3.4)	89 (3.5)	89 (3.5)	110 (4.3)	110 (4.3)	86 (3.4)	84 (3.3)	71 (2.8)	76 (3)	1,030 (40.7)
Source: Weatherbase
