= Bear Creek Lake State Park =

State park in Virginia, USA

- IUCN category III (natural monument or feature)
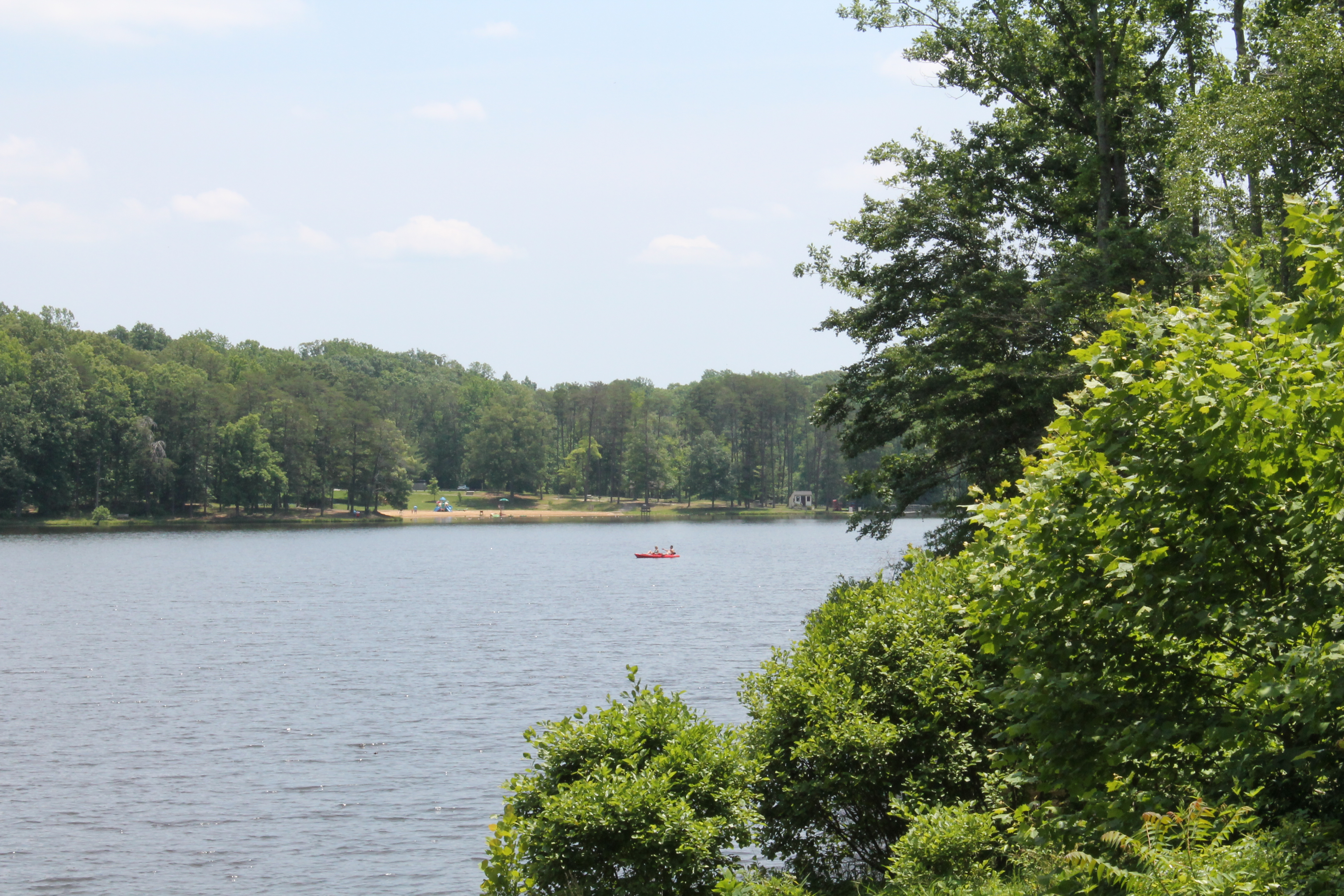
- Bear Creek Lake

- Location within Virginia Location within the United States
- Location: 22 Bear Creek Lake Rd., near Cumberland, VA
- Coordinates: 37°31′54″N 78°16′21″W
- Area: 329 acres (133 ha)
- Established: 1939
- Visitors: 78,288 (in 2013)
- Governing body: Virginia Department of Conservation and Recreation
- Bear Creek Lake State Park
- U.S. National Register of Historic Places
- Virginia Landmarks Register
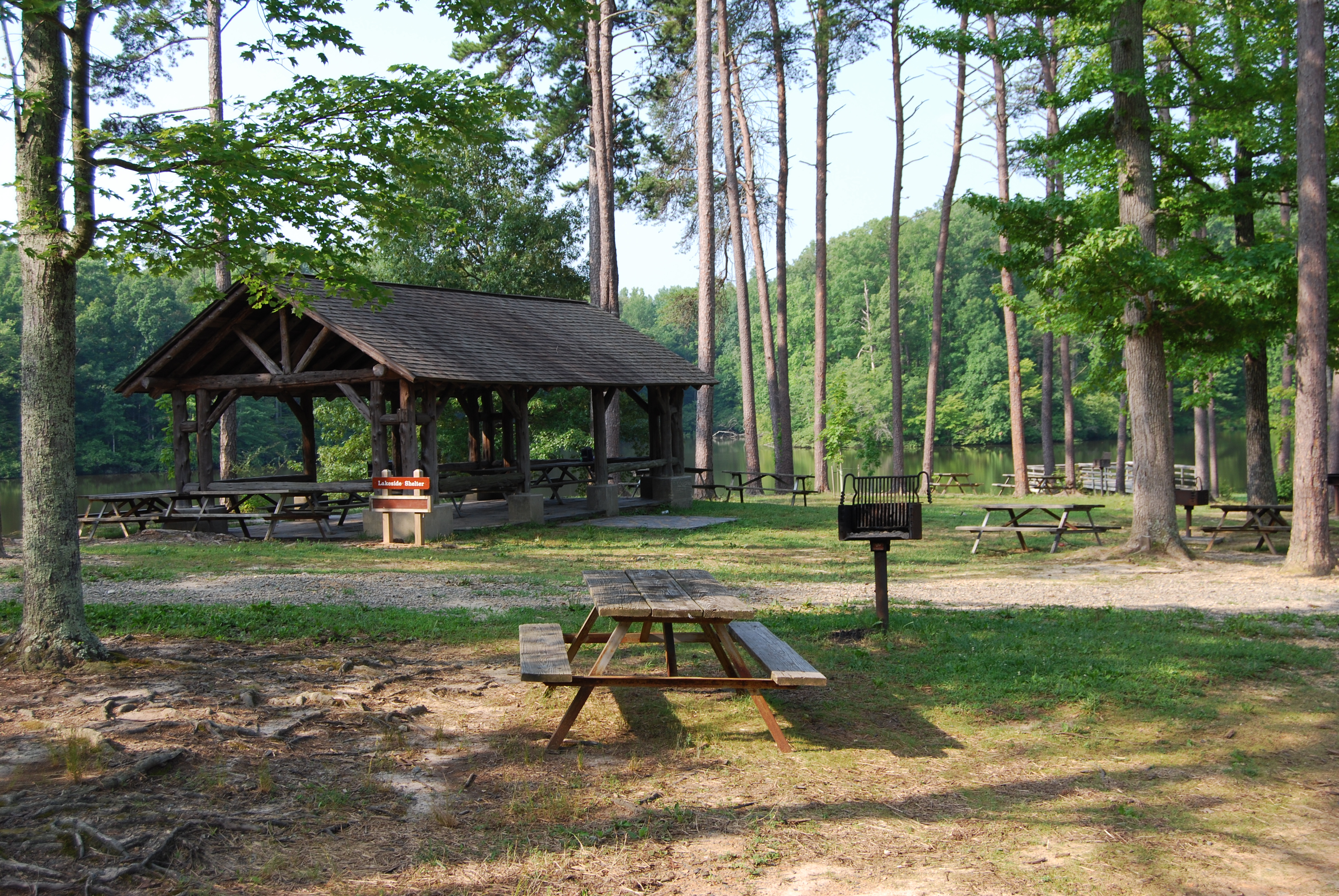
- The Lakeside Shelter, a contributing structure to the historic district
- NRHP reference No.: 12000904
- VLR No.: 024-0034

Significant dates
- Added to NRHP: October 31, 2012
- Designated VLR: September 18, 2008

Bear Creek Lake State Park is a 326-acre (132 ha) state park located in Cumberland, Virginia, United States. It is a recreational and camping facility that surrounds an artificial 40-acre (16 ha) lake situated in the 16,000-acre (6,500 ha) Cumberland State Forest. As of 2013, the yearly visitation was 78,288.

== History ==
Bear Creek Lake was built by members of the Civilian Conservation Corps in 1938 as a project of the Virginia Department of Agriculture through the State Forestry Division. The lake was built using labor from local carpenters, farmers and un-skilled laborers seeking jobs. In addition to the lake, two pavilions, a concession stand and six fireplaces were constructed. In 1940, the area opened as a forestry wayside with boat rentals and swimming. In 1958, the area was given to the Division of State Parks and was operated as a day-use recreation area. In 1962 the division added campgrounds and the area's name was changed to Bear Creek Lake State Park.

== Attractions ==
The park features a 40-acre (16 ha) lake with a boat launch, fishing pier, boat rentals and a swimming beach. Visitors will also find a meeting facility, cabins, camping, picnicking, an archery range and playgrounds. Guests also enjoy the park's nine trails and access to the adjoining 16,000-acre (6,500 ha) Cumberland State Forest, including the 14-mile (23 km) Cumberland Multi-use Trail. This trail is available for hiking, biking and horseback riding.

== See also ==
- List of Virginia state parks
