= Willis River =

River in Virginia, USA

Coordinates: 37°40′52″N 78°6′36″W

The Willis River is a 61.8-mile-long (99.5 km) tributary of the James River in central Virginia in the United States. Via the James River, it is part of the watershed of Chesapeake Bay.

According to the Geographic Names Information System, the Willis River has also been known as "Willis's River" and as "Willises River".

== Course ==
The Willis River rises in southern Buckingham County and initially flows eastwardly into Cumberland County, where it turns north-northeastwardly for the remainder of its course. It flows into the James River in northern Cumberland County, about 6 miles (10 km) southeast of Columbia.

== See also ==
- List of Virginia rivers
