= Cumberland, Virginia =

- Census-designated place
- Central Cumberland as seen from Anderson Highway (US Route 60)

- Location in Virginia Cumberland (the United States)
- Coordinates: 37°29′46″N 78°14′43″W
- Country: United States
- State: Virginia
- County: Cumberland

Area
  - Total: 4.19 sq mi (10.84 km^{2})
  - Land: 4.17 sq mi (10.79 km^{2})
  - Water: 0.023 sq mi (0.06 km^{2})
- Elevation: 455 ft (139 m)

Population (2020)
  - Total: 365
  - Density: 94/sq mi (36.4/km^{2})
- Time zone: UTC−5 (Eastern (EST))
  - Summer (DST): UTC−4 (EDT)
- ZIP code: 23040
- Area code: 804
- FIPS code: 51-20768
- GNIS feature ID: 1498472

Cumberland is a census-designated place (CDP) in and the county seat of Cumberland County, Virginia, United States. Cumberland lies along U.S. Route 60 and State Route 45. It is 48 miles (77 km) west of Richmond and 51 miles (82 km) east of Amherst. The population as of the 2020 census was 365.

== Demographics ==
Historical population
Census	Pop.	Note	%±
2010	393		—
2020	365		−7.1%
U.S. Decennial Census; 2010 2020

Cumberland was first listed as a census designated place in the 2010 U.S. census with a population of 393.
