= Cumberland County, Virginia =

County in Virginia, United States

- County
- Cumberland County Courthouse 2026

- Flag Seal

- Location within the U.S. state of Virginia
- Coordinates: 37°31′N 78°14′W
- Country: United States
- State: Virginia
- Founded: 1749
- Named for: William Augustus, Duke of Cumberland
- Seat: Cumberland
- Largest town: Farmville

Area
  - Total: 300 sq mi (780 km^{2})
  - Land: 297 sq mi (770 km^{2})
  - Water: 2.3 sq mi (6.0 km^{2}) 0.8%

Population (2020)
  - Total: 9,675
  - Estimate (2025): 10,352 ▲
  - Density: 32.6/sq mi (12.6/km^{2})
- Time zone: UTC−5 (Eastern)
  - Summer (DST): UTC−4 (EDT)
- Congressional district: 5th
- Website: cumberlandcounty.virginia.gov

Cumberland County is a rural United States county located near the geographic center of the Commonwealth of Virginia. The county's population is 9,675, as of the 2020 census, and the county seat is the small town of Cumberland.

The county was created in 1749 from part of Goochland County, and was named in honor of Prince William Augustus, the Duke of Cumberland at the time. In April 1776, it became the first Virginia county to call for independence from Great Britain.

== History ==
Cumberland County was established in 1749 from Goochland County. The county is named for William Augustus, Duke of Cumberland, third son of King George II of Great Britain. Cumberland County was also home to the Fleming family, which included Judge John Fleming and his son Judge William Fleming.

From 1749 until 1777, when the eastern portion was detached to form Powhatan County, Mosby Tavern served as the county courthouse. The tavern subsequently became known as "Old Cumberland Courthouse". In 1778 the narrow triangular area bordering the southern bank of the James River was annexed from Buckingham County.

== Geography ==
According to the U.S. Census Bureau, the county has a total area of 300 square miles (780 km^{2}), of which 297 sq mi (770 km^{2}) is land and 2.3 sq mi (6.0 km^{2}) (0.8%) is water.

=== Adjacent counties ===
- Goochland County – northeast
- Powhatan County – east
- Amelia County – southeast
- Prince Edward County – south
- Buckingham County – west
- Fluvanna County – northwest

=== Major highways ===
- US 60
- SR 13
- SR 45

== Demographics ==
This rural county suffered a long decline in population from 1880 to 1970, as the number of workers needed for agriculture was reduced through mechanization. Since then its population has grown, reaching a peak in 2010 nearly equal to its 19th-century high.

Historical population
Census	Pop.	Note	%±
1790	8,153		—
1800	9,839		20.7%
1810	9,992		1.6%
1820	11,023		10.3%
1830	11,690		6.1%
1840	10,399		−11.0%
1850	9,751		−6.2%
1860	9,961		2.2%
1870	8,142		−18.3%
1880	10,540		29.5%
1890	9,482		−10.0%
1900	8,996		−5.1%
1910	9,195		2.2%
1920	9,111		−0.9%
1930	7,535		−17.3%
1940	7,505		−0.4%
1950	7,252		−3.4%
1960	6,360		−12.3%
1970	6,179		−2.8%
1980	7,881		27.5%
1990	7,825		−0.7%
2000	9,017		15.2%
2010	10,052		11.5%
2020	9,675		−3.8%
2025 (est.)	10,352	▲	7.0%
U.S. Decennial Census; 1790-1960 1900-1990; 1990-2000 2010 2020

=== Racial and ethnic composition ===
Cumberland County, Virginia – Racial and ethnic composition Note: the US Census treats Hispanic/Latino as an ethnic category. This table excludes Latinos from the racial categories and assigns them to a separate category. Hispanics/Latinos may be of any race.
Race / Ethnicity (NH = Non-Hispanic)	Pop 1980	Pop 1990	Pop 2000	Pop 2010	Pop 2020	% 1980	% 1990	% 2000	% 2010	% 2020
White alone (NH)	4,445	4,738	5,386	6,353	6,104	56.40%	60.55%	59.73%	63.20%	63.09%
Black or African American alone (NH)	3,350	3,023	3,349	3,253	2,817	42.51%	38.63%	37.14%	32.36%	29.12%
Native American or Alaska Native alone (NH)	4	8	12	36	39	0.05%	0.10%	0.13%	0.36%	0.40%
Asian alone (NH)	5	9	31	35	36	0.06%	0.12%	0.34%	0.35%	0.37%
Native Hawaiian or Pacific Islander alone (NH)	x	x	0	0	8	x	x	0.00%	0.00%	0.08%
Other race alone (NH)	5	2	9	17	40	0.06%	0.03%	0.10%	0.17%	0.41%
Mixed race or Multiracial (NH)	x	x	80	177	390	x	x	0.89%	1.76%	4.03%
Hispanic or Latino (any race)	72	45	150	181	241	0.91%	0.58%	1.66%	1.80%	2.49%
Total	7,881	7,825	9,017	10,052	9,675	100.00%	100.00%	100.00%	100.00%	100.00%

=== 2020 census ===
As of the 2020 census, the county had a population of 9,675. The median age was 45.9 years. 20.4% of residents were under the age of 18 and 21.5% of residents were 65 years of age or older. For every 100 females there were 92.9 males, and for every 100 females age 18 and over there were 90.9 males age 18 and over.

The racial makeup of the county was 63.7% White, 29.3% Black or African American, 0.4% American Indian and Alaska Native, 0.4% Asian, 0.1% Native Hawaiian and Pacific Islander, 1.3% from some other race, and 4.8% from two or more races. Hispanic or Latino residents of any race comprised 2.5% of the population.

6.7% of residents lived in urban areas, while 93.3% lived in rural areas.

There were 4,041 households in the county, of which 26.1% had children under the age of 18 living with them and 28.1% had a female householder with no spouse or partner present. About 29.9% of all households were made up of individuals and 14.3% had someone living alone who was 65 years of age or older.

There were 4,636 housing units, of which 12.8% were vacant. Among occupied housing units, 73.4% were owner-occupied and 26.6% were renter-occupied. The homeowner vacancy rate was 1.4% and the rental vacancy rate was 3.7%.

=== 2000 census ===
As of the census of 2000, there were 9,017 people, 3,528 households, and 2,487 families residing in the county. The population density was 30 people per square mile (12 people/km^{2}). There were 4,085 housing units at an average density of 14 units per square mile (5.4 units/km^{2}). The racial makeup of the county was 60.37% White, 37.44% Black or African American, 0.18% Native American, 0.35% Asian, 0.59% from other races, and 1.06% from two or more races. 1.66% of the population were Hispanic or Latino of any race.

There were 3,528 households, out of which 30.00% had children under the age of 18 living with them, 51.60% were married couples living together, 14.30% had a female householder with no husband present, and 29.50% were non-families. 24.80% of all households were made up of individuals, and 10.70% had someone living alone who was 65 years of age or older. The average household size was 2.55 and the average family size was 3.03.

In the county, the population was spread out, with 24.70% under the age of 18, 7.30% from 18 to 24, 28.00% from 25 to 44, 25.10% from 45 to 64, and 14.80% who were 65 years of age or older. The median age was 38 years. For every 100 females there were 91.00 males. For every 100 females aged 18 and over, there were 88.20 males.

The median income for a household in the county was $31,816, and the median income for a family was $37,965. Males had a median income of $28,846 versus $22,521 for females. The per capita income for the county was $15,103. 15.10% of the population and 11.90% of families were below the poverty line. Out of the total people living in poverty, 19.60% are under the age of 18 and 16.10% are 65 or older.

== Government ==
=== Board of Supervisors ===
- District 1: Bryan Hamlet
- District 2: John L Newman (R) (Chairman)
- District 3: Eurika Tyree (Vice Chair)
- District 4: Paul Stimpson (R)
- District 5: Robert Saunders Jr.

=== Constitutional officers ===
- Clerk of the Circuit Court: Deidra Martin (I)
- Commissioner of the Revenue: Julie A. Phillips (I)
- Commonwealth's Attorney: Wendy Deaner Hannah (I)
- Sheriff: Darrell Hodges (I)
- Treasurer: L.O. Pfeiffer, Jr. (I)

Cumberland County is represented by Republican Luther Cifers in the Virginia Senate, Republican Thomas A. Garrett, Jr. in the Virginia House of Delegates, and Republican John J. McGuire, III in the U.S. House of Representatives.

United States presidential election results for Cumberland County, Virginia
Year	Republican		Democratic		Third party(ies)	
Year	No.	%	No.	%	No.	%
1912	10	2.48%	362	89.60%	32	7.92%
1916	73	14.07%	446	85.93%	0	0.00%
1920	114	21.47%	413	77.78%	4	0.75%
1924	61	12.53%	398	81.72%	28	5.75%
1928	213	32.52%	442	67.48%	0	0.00%
1932	84	13.82%	511	84.05%	13	2.14%
1936	136	22.08%	476	77.27%	4	0.65%
1940	157	28.09%	396	70.84%	6	1.07%
1944	218	31.82%	463	67.59%	4	0.58%
1948	219	26.94%	424	52.15%	170	20.91%
1952	695	54.42%	574	44.95%	8	0.63%
1956	566	42.91%	331	25.09%	422	31.99%
1960	691	54.75%	559	44.29%	12	0.95%
1964	1,099	55.59%	871	44.06%	7	0.35%
1968	844	34.70%	978	40.21%	610	25.08%
1972	1,371	57.75%	969	40.82%	34	1.43%
1976	1,284	46.57%	1,302	47.23%	171	6.20%
1980	1,515	50.10%	1,355	44.81%	154	5.09%
1984	2,027	60.89%	1,237	37.16%	65	1.95%
1988	1,978	62.61%	1,132	35.83%	49	1.55%
1992	1,643	48.55%	1,284	37.94%	457	13.50%
1996	1,544	48.40%	1,303	40.85%	343	10.75%
2000	1,974	56.29%	1,405	40.06%	128	3.65%
2004	2,377	57.61%	1,721	41.71%	28	0.68%
2008	2,418	51.19%	2,255	47.73%	51	1.08%
2012	2,538	50.28%	2,422	47.98%	88	1.74%
2016	2,697	54.97%	2,036	41.50%	173	3.53%
2020	3,019	56.85%	2,227	41.94%	64	1.21%
2024	3,335	60.63%	2,117	38.48%	49	0.89%

== Education ==
Cumberland County Public Schools, the only school division in the county, serves over 1400 students in the county. The district operates Cumberland Elementary School (PreK-4), Cumberland Middle School (5-8), and Cumberland High School (9-12). The superintendent is Dr. Chip Jones (2022).

== Communities ==
=== Town ===
- Farmville (primarily in Prince Edward County)

=== Unincorporated communities ===
- Cartersville
- Cumberland (a census-designated place)
- Tamworth

== Attractions and events ==
Bear Creek Lake State Park is located 4.5 miles (7.2 km) northwest of the town of Cumberland. Bear Creek Lake features overnight cabins, a lodge, permanent camp sites, and picnic shelters. Swimming and boating are allowed at the lake, and boat rentals are available. The park also has trails for hiking and running.

The 16,233-acre (65.69 km^{2}) Cumberland State Forest is north of U.S. Route 60, west of State Route 45 and bordered on the west by the Willis River. The Forest has multiple purposes, including watershed protection, recreation, timber production, hunting, fishing, and applied forest research. There are two self-guided trails at Cumberland State Forest that are open for walking, hiking, horses, and mountain bikes. These are the Cumberland Multi-Use Trail (14 miles) and the Willis River Hiking Trail (16 miles). White-tailed deer, wild turkey, and bobcats are common residents of this natural area. The State forest also features five lakes which may be fished from with a Virginia State fishing license, including: Oak Hill Lake, Bear Creek Lake, Winston Lake, Arrowhead Lake, and Bonbrook Lake.

== Notable people ==
- Justice Paul Carrington (1733–1818), second member appointed of the Virginia Supreme Court. Born at "Boston Hill".
- Lena Trent Gordon (1885-1935), Philadelphia-based political organizer, poet, born in Cumberland.

== See also ==
- National Register of Historic Places listings in Cumberland County, Virginia
