= National Register of Historic Places listings in Goochland County, Virginia =

Location of Goochland County in Virginia

This is a list of the National Register of Historic Places listings in Goochland County, Virginia.

This is intended to be a complete list of the properties and districts on the National Register of Historic Places in Goochland County, Virginia, United States. The locations of National Register properties and districts for which the latitude and longitude coordinates are included below, may be seen in an online map.

There are 25 properties and districts listed on the National Register in the county, including 1 National Historic Landmark.

This National Park Service list is complete through NPS recent listings posted May 1, 2026.

== Current listings ==
	Name on the Register	Image	Date listed	Location	City or town	Description
1	Belvidere	Belvidere	August 15, 2016 (#16000529)	4024 Pace Rd. 37°48′51″N 78°00′20″W	Hadensville	
2	Ben Dover	Ben Dover	April 14, 2000 (#00000311)	661 W. State Route 6; 37°36′27″N 77°44′16″W	Manakin-Sabot	
3	Bolling Hall	Bolling Hall	December 27, 1972 (#72001397)	West of Goochland off Rock Castle Rd. 37°40′55″N 77°57′34″W	Goochland	
4	Bolling Island	Bolling Island	December 27, 1990 (#89001926)	Stokes Station Rd. 37°39′21″N 78°02′23″W	Goochland	
5	Brightly	Brightly	August 16, 2006 (#06000705)	2844 W. U.S. Route 322; 37°40′34″N 77°53′08″W	Goochland	
6	Byrd Presbyterian Church	Byrd Presbyterian Church	November 22, 2000 (#00001438)	2229 Dogtown Rd. 37°42′51″N 77°56′23″W	Goochland	
7	Cartersville Bridge	Cartersville Bridge	September 14, 1972 (#72001390)	State Route 45 over the James River; 37°40′17″N 78°05′11″W	Cartersville	Extends into Cumberland County
8	Dover Slave Quarter Complex	Dover Slave Quarter Complex	September 15, 2002 (#02001005)	854 Dover Rd. 37°37′46″N 77°46′17″W	Manakin-Sabot	
9	Elk Hill	Elk Hill	February 28, 1979 (#79003042)	West of Goochland off State Route 6; 37°43′01″N 78°05′05″W	Goochland	
10	First Union School	First Union School	August 12, 2009 (#09000614)	1522 Old Mill Rd. 37°39′07″N 77°47′37″W	Crozier	
11	Goochland County Court Square	Goochland County Court Square	September 15, 1970 (#70000797)	State Route 6; 37°40′57″N 77°53′03″W	Goochland	
12	Howard's Neck Plantation	Howard's Neck Plantation	February 23, 1972 (#72001398)	1 mile (1.6 km) northwest of Pemberton; 37°40′51″N 78°05′39″W	Pemberton	
13	Jackson Blacksmith Shop	Jackson Blacksmith Shop	December 11, 1997 (#97001511)	2558 Blacksmith Shop Rd. 37°44′32″N 77°54′19″W	Goochland	
14	Lock-Keeper's House	Lock-Keeper's House	November 21, 1974 (#74002119)	Off State Route 6 at the James River; 37°41′29″N 77°54′32″W	Cedar Point	
15	Mount Bernard Complex	Mount Bernard Complex	January 20, 2005 (#04001537)	2371 W. State Route 6; 37°39′25″N 77°51′30″W	Maidens	
16	Oak Grove	Oak Grove	September 16, 2009 (#09000727)	664 Manakin Rd. 37°36′43″N 77°42′15″W	Manakin-Sabot	
17	Powell's Tavern	Powell's Tavern	April 2, 1973 (#73002020)	River Rd. 37°34′57″N 77°39′37″W	Manakin	
18	Rochambeau Farm	Rochambeau Farm	August 5, 1999 (#99000969)	1080 Manakin Rd. 37°37′55″N 77°43′09″W	Manakin-Sabot	
19	Rock Castle	Rock Castle	September 15, 1970 (#70000798)	Rock Castle Rd. 37°37′45″N 77°58′49″W	Rock Castle	
20	Second Union School	Second Union School	January 31, 2006 (#05001583)	2787 Hadensville Fife Rd. 37°45′53″N 78°03′09″W	Goochland	
21	Springdale	Springdale	December 4, 2002 (#02001490)	2048 Cardwell Rd. 37°41′27″N 77°47′21″W	Crozier	
22	Tanglewood-037-5010	Tanglewood-037-5010	July 11, 2002 (#02000775)	2200-2210 W. State Route 6; 37°39′08″N 77°50′45″W	Maidens	
23	Tinsley Tavern	Tinsley Tavern	April 4, 2007 (#07000276)	2791 Elk Island Rd. 37°45′44″N 78°06′01″W	Columbia	
24	Tuckahoe	Tuckahoe	November 22, 1968 (#68000049)	Southeast of Manakin near the junction of River Rd. and Pagebrook Dr. 37°34′12″N 77°39′10″W	Manakin	
25	Woodlawn	Woodlawn	December 16, 1971 (#71000978)	Southeast of Oilville at the junction of U.S. Route 250 and Threechopt Rd. 37°41′06″N 77°44′11″W	Oilville	

== See also ==
- List of National Historic Landmarks in Virginia
- National Register of Historic Places listings in Virginia
