= Rock Castle =

Rock Castle or Rockcastle may refer to:

- Rock castle, a type of medieval castle

in the United States (by state)

- Rockcastle, Kentucky, unincorporated community
- Rockcastle River, a river in Kentucky
- Rock Castle (Hendersonville, Tennessee), listed on the National Register of Historic Places in Sumner County, Tennessee
- Rock Castle, Virginia, a community
- Rock Castle (Virginia), listed on the National Register of Historic Places in Goochland County, Virginia
- Rock Castle, West Virginia, a community

== See also ==
Castle Rock
