= Belvidere (Goochland County, Virginia) =

Historic house in Virginia, United States

- U.S. National Register of Historic Places
- U.S. Historic district
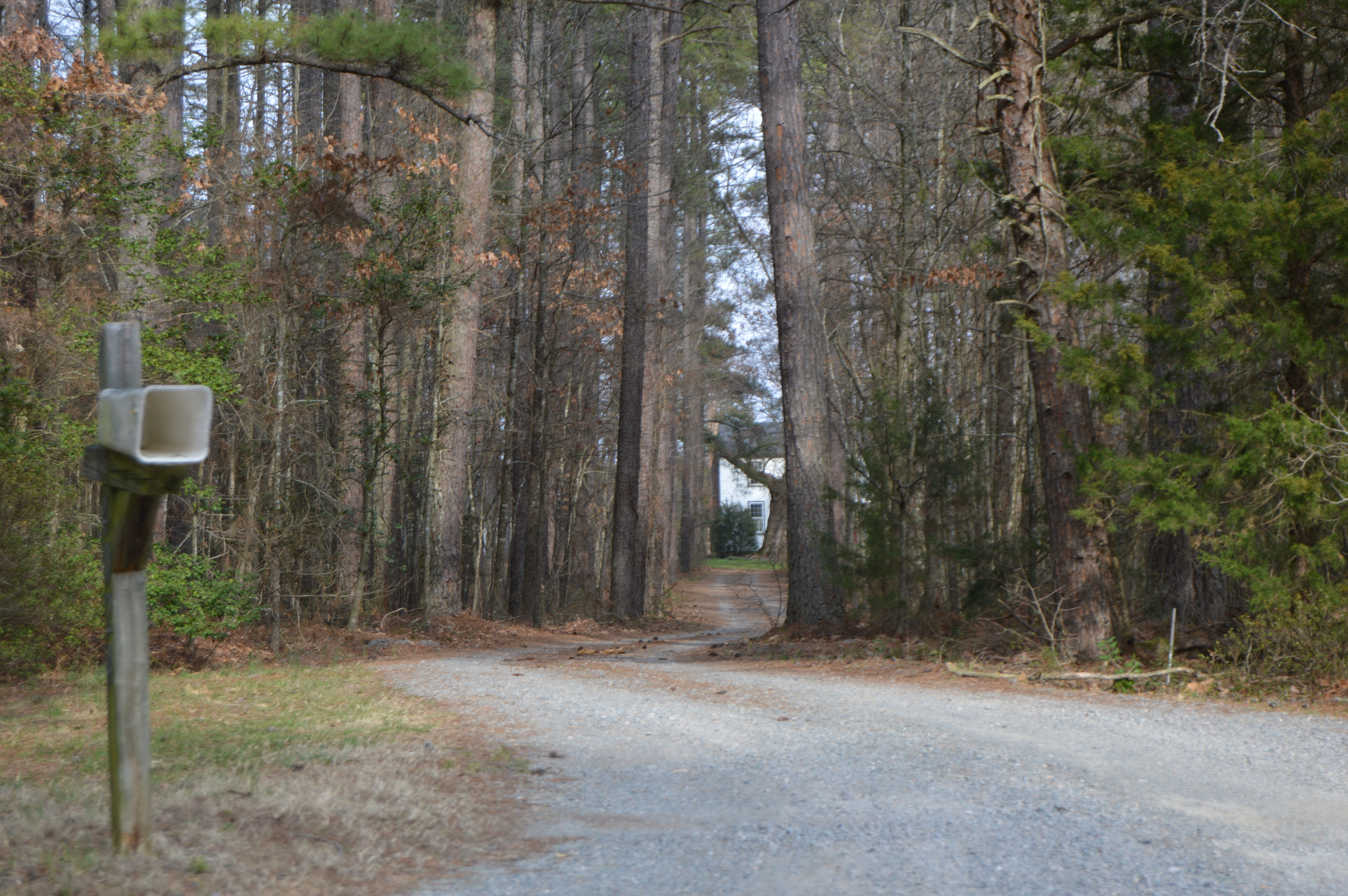
- Looking down the driveway

- Location within Virginia Location within the United States
- Location: 4024 Pace Rd., near Hadensville, Virginia
- Coordinates: 37°48′51″N 78°0′20″W
- Area: 127 acres (51 ha)
- NRHP reference No.: 16000529
- Added to NRHP: August 15, 2016

Belvidere is a historic farm property at 4024 Pace Road in rural Goochland County, Virginia, south of the hamlet of Hadensville. The property consists of 127 acres (51 ha) that are now mainly woodland, with a cleared area near its center with some fields and the farm complex. The centerpiece of the farm complex is a two-story wood-frame house, whose oldest portion probably dates to the late 18th century. It was enlarged by a two-story addition in 1821–22, and underwent further alterations in the 19th century before undergoing restoration beginning in 1979. It is a rare surviving example of 18th-century architecture in the county.

The property was listed on the National Register of Historic Places in 2016.

== See also ==
- National Register of Historic Places listings in Goochland County, Virginia
