= Bend over =

Bend over or Bend Ova may refer to:

- "Bück dich", a German song by Rammstein
- "Bend Ova", a 2000 song by Phife Dawg from the album Ventilation: Da LP
- "Bend Ova", a 2014 song by Lil Jon and Tyga
- "Bend Over", a 2001 song on the album Musipal by Wagon Christ
- Bend over, a slang "to twerk"

== See also ==
- Ben Dova (born 1905 as Joseph Späh), German–American acrobat and actor and survivor of the Hindenburg disaster
- Ben Dover (born 1955), an English pornographic actor
- Ben Dover (Virginia), a national historic district in Virginia
