= Bolling Island =

Historic house in Virginia, United States

- U.S. National Register of Historic Places
- Virginia Landmarks Register
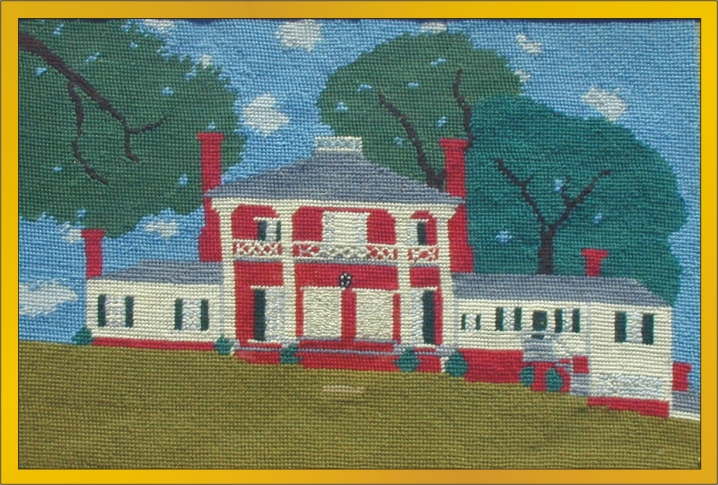
- Bolling Island, needlepoint by Henry "Chief" Couture

- Location within Virginia Location within the United States
- Location: Stokes Station Rd., near Goochland, Virginia
- Coordinates: 37°39′20″N 78°02′56″W
- Area: 50 acres (20 ha)
- Built: c. 1771-1845
- Architectural style: Greek Revival
- NRHP reference No.: 89001926
- VLR No.: 037-0003

Significant dates
- Added to NRHP: December 27, 1990
- Designated VLR: August 15, 1989

Bolling Island is a historic plantation house located overlooking the upper James River near Goochland, Goochland County, Virginia. The original frame section, now the east wing, was built in 1771. The principal two-story, hipped roof brick core was built between 1800 and 1810.

The house was remodeled extensively between 1820 and 1835, as a Greek Revival style villa. At the time it was owned by Thomas Bolling, son of Col. William Bolling, who owned Bolling Hall, also a plantation in Goochland County.

The younger Bolling installed triple-hung sash as part of his renovations, and added the portico with a Chinese lattice railing. He also added an orangery to the east wing. This resulted in the tri-partite scheme showing influence by Thomas Jefferson.

The main house has a "T" plan and a two-story rear ell. The front facade features a two-story portico with a balustraded second level. Also on the property are the contributing smokehouse (c. 1845), office (1839), and brick kitchen.

It was listed on the National Register of Historic Places in 1990.
