= Huguenot Memorial Chapel and Monument =

Historic church in Virginia, United States

- Manakin Huguenot Church and Monument
- U.S. National Register of Historic Places
- Virginia Landmarks Register
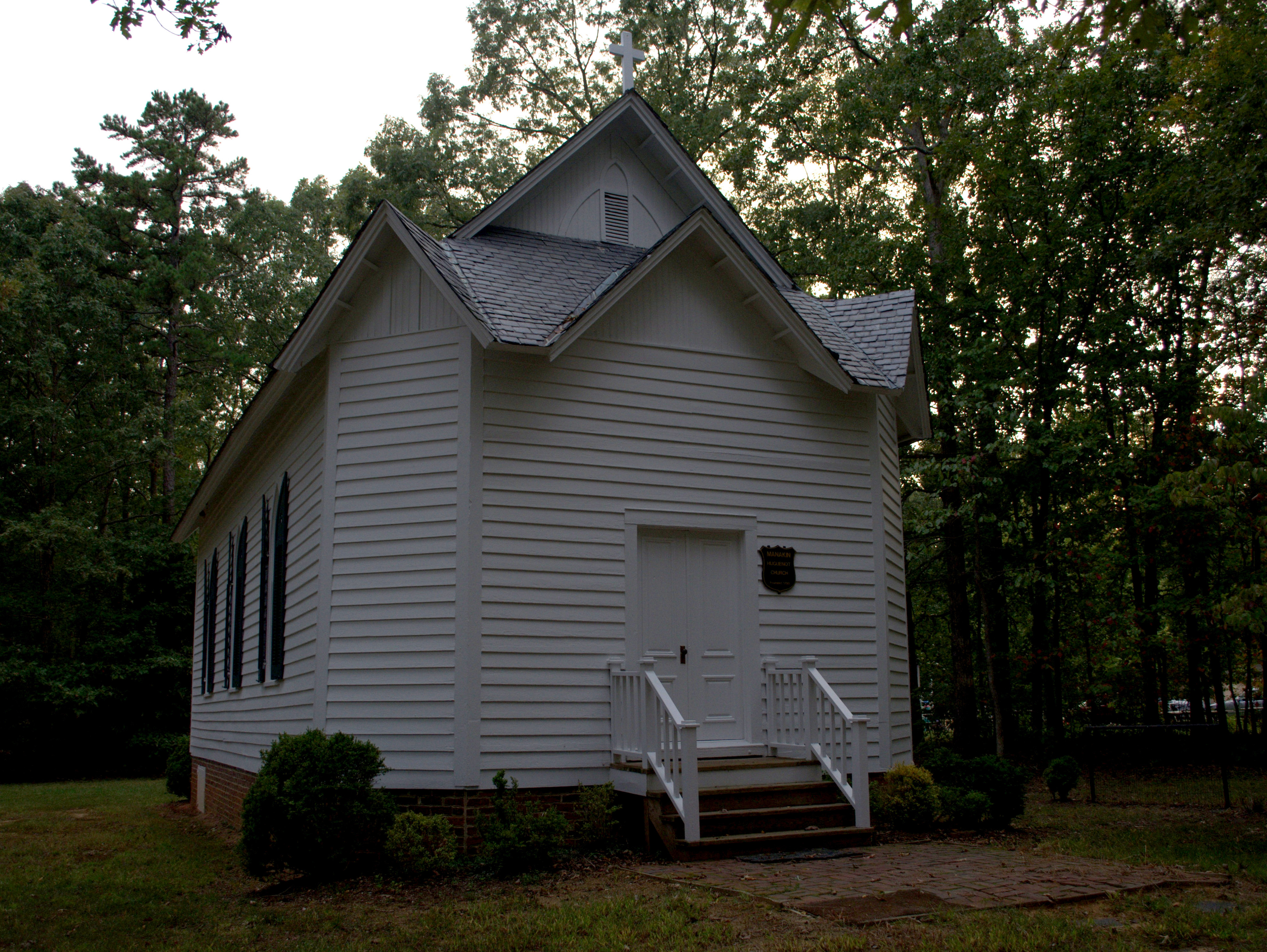
- Manakin Huguenot Church and Monument

- Location within Virginia Location within the United States
- Location: VA 711, Manakin, Virginia
- Coordinates: 37°33′53″N 77°42′33″W
- Area: 2 acres (0.81 ha)
- Built: 1895
- Built by: Lawson & Newton
- Architectural style: Late Gothic Revival
- NRHP reference No.: 88000214
- VLR No.: 072-0093

Significant dates
- Added to NRHP: March 23, 1988
- Designated VLR: June 17, 1987

Huguenot Memorial Chapel and Monument is a historic church located at Manakin, Powhatan County, Virginia.

== Significance ==
The Huguenot Memorial Chapel and Monument are tangible reminders both of the largest Huguenot settlement in colonial America and of the ethnic heritage of Huguenot descendants. While intended primarily to commemorate the planting of French Protestant refugees at Manakin towne in the colony of Virginia in 1700, the chapel and monument have been invested by design, age, tradition and symbolic value with their own historical significance.

A simple wood-frame country church in a modified Gothic Revival style, the chapel was erected in 1895 as Manakin Church, the fourth such building to serve King William Parish since its designation as a distinct religious center for French Protestant refugees in 1700.

Notwithstanding the historic use of the building as a religious property and the building's careful removal from its original location to an adjacent site in order to preserve it as a Huguenot memorial, the chapel possesses historical and symbolic importance because it incorporates structural members which are believed to include the nation's oldest architectural fragment of a Huguenot building, because it stands on the glebe land and near the site of the first church of the French Protestant refugees of Manakin, and because it has served for more than fifty years as a focus of tradition associated with the historic identity of Huguenot descendants.

Erected by the Society of the Founders of Manakin in the Colony of Virginia, the monument is a light granite plinth displaying a Huguenot cross, Society insignia, and commemorative inscriptions that symbolize the values, ideas and cultural contributions valued by the generation that dedicated it to the memory of their Huguenot ancestors on April 18, 1937. The two properties are maintained in their historic wooded setting on "Huguenot Highway" by the Society of the Founders of Manakin in the Colony of Virginia on land expressly acquired by the society for commemorative purposes.

== Physical Appearance ==
Manakin Huguenot Chapel is a simple wood-frame church erected in 1895 incorporating structural members believed to have been salvaged from the 1730 Huguenot church of King William Parish as well as a large summer beam believed to have survived from the 1710 Huguenot church at Manakin.

The building is set off by its distinctive three-sided narthex and pointed side windows. Its present location is the chapel's third site, the building having first been built on or near the site of the present Manakin Episcopal Church and then moved about 200 feet to the south. The present site, towards the east of the second site, is still within a few hundred feet of the chapel's original location; its wooded surroundings maintain the integrity of its historic setting.

About 300 feet to the north of the chapel is a large granite marker, erected in 1936 by the Society of the Founders of Manakin in the Colony of Virginia, honoring the largest Huguenot settlement in colonial America. The nominated acreage thus includes one contributing historic building and contributing historic object.

== Huguenot Church History according to Calder Loth ==
Set in a wooded area just southeast of the present Manakin Episcopal Church, off scenic route 711, and a mile and a half across the fields from the James River, the Manakin Huguenot Chapel is a simple wood-frame country church in a modified Gothic Revival style. The chapel measures approximately 24' by 32' and is covered by a steep gable roof. The walls are sheathed in white weatherboards and have three pointed windows on each side and a single stained-glass window on the rear elevation. The rear window is flanked by two entrances with simple stoops. The front of the chapel is set off by a distinctive three-sided projecting narthex having a gable above each of its three sides. However, it is said that this arrangement proved awkward for funerals so the original entrances were weatherboarded over and a new double-door entrance was placed on axis with the center aisle. This alternation resulted in the removal of a pointed window where the present entrance now is.

The chapel is entered through the narthex which contains a narrow stair to the rear gallery. Double doors separate the narthex from the nave, a room taking up the main body of the chapel and covered by a gabled, tongue-and-groove board ceiling. Lighting consists of six, one-over-one, clear -glass, pointed windows set in rectangular frames. Lighting the chancel and sanctuary is a single pointed-arch, stained -glass window containing the figure of a saint sowing seeds. The sanctuary is topped by a wooden Gothic vault. On either side of the sanctuary are small vestries. The choir is raised one step above the nave and is separated from it by a simple wood railing with turned balusters matching the gallery rail balusters. Seating consists of plain, hand-planed wooden pews which appear to be earlier than the church. In the gallery is a single, similar, but much older pew, thought to have been used in the earlier church.

An architectural examination of the chapel conducted in September 1985 by Calder Loth, senior architectural historian of the Virginia Division of Historic Landmarks, and Edward Chappell director of architectural research of the Colonial Williamsburg Foundation, confirmed the tradition that the chapel is partly constructed of materials salvaged from earlier buildings. While it cannot be proved, it is likely that some of this earlier fabric was salvaged from the 1730 Huguenot Church which the parish ordered demolished in 1894 in order to construct the present building, a smaller edifice to better accommodate the diminished congregation. The present building also incorporates a large central or summer beam supporting the flooring system. This beam is clearly a reused upside down plate, 30' 11" long, incomplete at both ends, and 1' x 6" thick with three hewn sides and one pit-sawn side. A charred 4'x 9" section removed from the front end and displayed in the nave, has raised the possibility that the beam is a fragment of the second Manakin Church, erected ca. 1710 and destroyed by fire about 1729. The theory is that this sturdy beam though charred at one end was sufficiently undamaged for use in the third church, and remained there until its demolition. If this theory is correct, the beam would thus be the nation's oldest surviving architectural fragment of a Huguenot building. The floor joists now set into the beam appear to be reused early joists and/or posts. Other reused materials included roof braces above the chancel which are planed boards with a beaded edge. With their backs roughly hewn to fit studs on 21" centers, the boards probably are old baseboards. At the rear of the church are reused corner posts and at least one early whitewashed weatherboard with several wrought T-headed, spadepointed nails surviving. In the front wall is a straight-sawn rafter surviving as a stud. It has a collar lap that retains a large wrought nail. The main roof timbering, however, is entirely of late 19th- century construction. Other areas of the front and side walls were not available for examination.

The original location of the chapel as well as its colonial predecessor was approximately where the present Manakin Episcopal Church now stands. The chapel was moved approximately 200 feet to the south in 1954 to make way for the present church. In 1985 it was moved to its present location about 300 feet to the east in order to have the chapel on property owned by the Society of the Founders of Manakin and thus to preserve it in perpetuity as a Huguenot Memorial and museum. Since it was last relocated the chapel has been carefully rehabilitated and is in excellent condition.

About 300 feet to the north of the chapel is a large granite monument carved with a Huguenot cross and commemorative inscriptions honoring the founders of Mankin towne. The monument was erected in 1936 by the Society of the Founders of Manakin in the Colony of Virginia.

Calder Loth

== Huguenot Church History, by Robert Allen Carter ==
The revocation of the Edict of Nantes by Louis XIV in 1685, ending nearly a century of official religious toleration in France, precipitated an exodus of Huguenots, French Protestants who followed the teachings of Calvin. Their departure to Holland, Switzerland, Germany, and the British Isles and colonies struck a blow to French economic life and left Protestants who remained in France under much the same civil and religious proscription as Catholics in the British Isles. French Protestants who fled persecution, many of whom came from the commercial and industrial classes, were encouraged by British philanthropy and colonial policy to cross the Atlantic and settle in Massachusetts, New York, Pennsylvania, Maryland, Virginia, North Carolina, and South Carolina. While Huguenots came to Virginia and the other British colonies both before and after the turn of the 17th century, the Huguenot settlement at Manakin towne in 1700 was significant as the largest Huguenot settlement in colonial Virginia and the largest ever made by Huguenots in America. 1

During the summer and fall of 1700 several shiploads of French Protestant refugees arrived from England at Hampton, Virginia and were immediately sent up the James River to a point 20 miles above the falls to settle in present day Powhatan County on 10,000 acres of land that had been cleared and occupied in the previous century by native Monocans. The efforts of William Byrd I, who had first proposed the project to the British Council of Trade and Plantations in 1698, and obtained the grant from the Assembly on the colonists' behalf, were not wholly disinterested. A new settlement of some 300 souls promised to strengthen frontier defenses and raise the value and yield of Byrd's large landholdings and mill at Falling Creek, while adding substantially to the health of Virginia's growing colonial population. The Council of Trade and Plantations had been especially persuaded by Byrd's reasoning that it was more to Britain's interest to send Huguenots to an established colony than to permit them to establish a new colony, in which their ability to supply their own needs or provide any strategic advantage to England would be long delayed . King William III and the Protestant Relief Fund agreed to underwrite the cost of resettling the French refugees, the king directing that a part of the donation be set aside for the purchase of Prayer Books and Bibles and for the building of a church in Virginia. Because the Council of Trade gave serious consideration to an alternate proposal to send the party to a disputed tract of land between Virginia and Carolina, some leaders of the refugees thought they were founding a new colony of their own in coming to Virginia; however, they were disabused of the notion by the Virginia Governor and Council, who in reply to a petition in 1702 banned the use of the title of colony in all subsequent communications from the settlement and ordered the refugees to present all future petitions to the governor in the English tongue. 2

The colonial government acted with greater alacrity to provide for the spiritual needs of the refugees. On December 5, 1700 the Assembly created King William Parish, "makeing the French refugees inhabiting at Manakin towne and the parts adjacent a distinct parrish by themselves, and exempting them from the payment of publick and county levyes for seaven years." 3 This action did much to encourage the Huguenots since it now allowed them to collect parish tithes for the support of their own church and pastor. Their minister had died shortly after their arrival, and the Bishop of London sent Benjamin de Joux, a French-speaking Anglican priest, to serve as their minister. Under his leadership they erected the original or first Manakin church. Although its exact location is unknown, this small, octagonal, wooden structure probably stood near the James River and about half-way between the two creeks now known as Bernard's Creek and Norwood Creek, the boundaries of the Huguenot grant. 4

A second frame church building served the parish from 1710 until it fell victim to fire, and was replaced by a larger house of worship erected by Francois James, carpenter, in 1730-31. Also built of wood, this third church building stood considerably farther away from the river where the Huguenot ferry and river roads intersected at a more central location to the larger area which the Huguenots now farmed. The exact location of the third church, which stood approximately on the site of the later fourth and fifth parish churches, is shown on a plat of the glebe farm drawn for a survey of the property by Thomas Pleasants on December 8, 1838. 5

Within the first generation of Huguenot settlement at Manakin towne King William became an Anglican parish partly because of the hospitality shown to the Huguenot settlers by the British government under William 111, the bishop of London and many other Anglicans. But there were also numerous political, socio-economic and practical reasons for this conversion, one of which was the difficulty of obtaining French-speaking clergymen and another, the gradual desertion of the village and its surrounding area by many of the settlers for farmsteads in adjacent parishes and counties. After the death of Jean Cairon in 1716, their third regular minister of Huguenot descent, the vestry began to rely upon Anglican ministers from neighboring communities. As a result their order of worship became closer to that of the Church of England. By 1747 services were conducted half in French and half in English. 6

The gradual disappearance of French surnames from the parish vestry book had its parallel in the erosion of the boundaries of original Manakin towne settlement. Although it was the original intention that the settlers should live near one another in a group of houses forming a village street with such public buildings as a church, parsonage, schoolhouse, and hospital, the generous distribution of 133 acres to each Huguenot family tended to pull the community apart from its planned nucleus. In its most flourishing condition the village is thought to have contained only a few houses and the church. The parish, which contained 291 souls in 1714, numbered only 239 inhabitants in 1744, few of whom actually lived in the village itself. While the cultural contributions of descendants of the Huguenots at Manakin towne are remarkable, the story of Manakin itself is primarily one of a town that failed to prosper. 7 Neither the hopes of some refugees who sought to preserve their cultural and spiritual identity in a new land nor the hopes of some colonial leaders that the settlement might become a manufacturing center ever materialized. Manakin's importance as a town effectively ended in 1750 when the whole of the village site was acquired by the Scott family, whose descendants held the original land, including the glebe land tract acquired by Edward Scott in 1821, into the 20th century. With the rise of Methodism during the Revolution and the later disestablishment of the Anglican church, the Manakin congregation dwindled in numbers until the mid-19th century. The parish was held together by several dedicated clergymen. Most notable were the contributions of A. B. Tizard, who served as rector from 1857 to 1897. By the end of the 19th century, the old colonial church building of 1730-31 was thought to be too large and expensive to maintain for the diminished congregation, so it was razed and a portion of its timbers used in construction of the fourth Manakin church in 1894-95. The new building was still in use as the parish house of worship in 1918, when Mary Kennon Scott and C. Selden Scott charitably deeded over title to both the church building and a parcel of several acres on which the church then stood, in consideration of the sum of one dollar. 8

On April 17, 1922, the Huguenot Society of the Founders of Manakin in the Colony of Virginia was organized in Vallejo, California for the professed object of gathering, preserving and publishing the records of the French Protestant refugees who settled at Manakin, Virginia in 1700; to perpetuate the principles of religious and political liberty for which their Huguenot ancestors stood; and to erect at the site of the Manakin town settlement a monument to their memory.'~ike other hereditary, patriotic societies of period, members were actuated by motives of both fear and love. Fear of atheism, fear of communism, and alarm over disturbing trends in the country's social, cultural and economic life impelled some with claims to Huguenot ancestry to propagate the Society's programs. Love of God, love of country, and love of religious and political liberty, at a time when democracy and traditional American values appeared under attack at home and abroad, no doubt also moved the Society's founders and membership to gather together under the same tribal banner. How these tendencies came together was perhaps expressed best by the Society's National Registrar, Josephine Greene, in 1933: "In these perilous times, when it is evident that attempts are being made to replace the religion of our valiant Huguenot forefathers with fallacious, atheistic doctrines, it would seem that the surest way to perpetuate and protect their Christian faith and ideals is by adding to our membership all who trace their lineage back to the Founders of Manakintowne. Those who have their interest in the historic past quickened, have aroused their responsibility in the present and hope for the future ." 10

Besides these twin yet contradictory impulses, which had woven a familiar pattern in American nativism since the Civil War, the Society's objects were also fraternal and genealogical. As Dr. James G. Chastain, National Chaplain of the Society explained, members needed the society and its state and local branches in order to get better acquainted with their widely extended Huguenot family and to quicken their interest in genealogy. Noting "that ten million dollars were spent annually in tracing ancestry," Chastain affirmed on behalf of the society that "We believe in the fine blood of people, as truly as we do in that of registered stock. While there was little in these objects that approached the historian's critical interest in distinguishing between myth and reality, society members shared in a longstanding complaint against American ignorance of history, especially when such ignorance obscured the origins, sufferings and labors of their Huguenot ancestors. Society activity sprang deeply from a sense that the Huguenots "have never received credit commensurate with the valuable service they have rendered. The Huguenots have done more for the intellectual, moral and political uplift of the human race than have any other people of equal number in the world, 19 Chastain declared. 12 At a time when the Puritans of New England had become the butt of ridicule for such cultural critics as H.L. Mencken and William Carlos Williams, the Huguenots offered an alternative cultural image for "a piety equal to that of the Puritans, but without the bigotry of the latter." 13 Declared the Rev. John A. Maynard, " May we not descendants of the French Huguenots, protest against the attempt to present the spirit of morality as a sour long face cartoon of what Boston puritans were supposed to be. Whether they were or not, at times, we at least can plead not guilty. This was never our way of understanding life." 14

According to founder Mary L. Norton, who composed a summary history of the Society on the occasion of the organization of its first Virginia Branch in 1931, the aim of erecting a commemorative monument to the Huguenot settlers of Manakintowne was discussed at her suggestion at the Society's first meeting, held in her home in 1922. 15 While the Society quickly made progress in drawing up a constitution, electing officers, adopting an insignia, accepting applications, certifying Huguenot lineage, starting a library and publishing a yearbook, nothing was pledged toward a memorial fund until 1926, when the California State Society made the first contribution with a gift of $10.00. By the time of the inauguration of its first national meeting at Farmville, Virginia in 1932, the Society had established a permanent Memorial Fund Committee, and the subscriptions of members and State Societies and initiation fees for new members had increased the Fund to $1,094 . National President Gladys White Cragon reported in 1933 that although the fund was not yet sufficient for a suitable memoria1, the "consensus of opinion was that the memorial should take the form of a granite shaft to cost in the neighborhood of $3,000." 16

A similar unanimity of opinion emerged on the selection of an appropriate site for the contemplated memorial. After repeated searches failed to locate the exact sites of the first and second Manakin churches, the Society's board determined to erect the monument along the old River Road on a remnant of the ancient Glebe Farm and in proximity to the fourth Manakin Church.l?n support of this effort, the new Virginia chapter successfully petitioned the Virginia General Assembly to designate the road as the "Huguenot Highway," sponsored pilgrimages to the site in conjunction with national and statewide meetings of the Society, and secured from the Trustees of the church an adjacent parcel of one and one sixth acres of land on which to erect the monument. These transactions were completed by 1935, the year in which the National Society received its charter as a not-for-profit corporation under the laws of Virginia as well as a pledge of $1,000 to the Memorial Fund by National President-elect, Mrs. John F. McDougall of New York, covering the balance of expenses for the memorial's design and execution.

Final selection of both the design and the precise location of the memorial was entrusted to a special committee chaired by Mrs. McDougall, assisted by Landscape Architect John Watkins and H. J. Neal, Landscape Engineer of the Virginia Department of Highways. After obtaining bids from five contractors, Lawson and Newton of Norfolk were selected to design and carve the light granite plinth, displaying a Huguenot cross and Society insignia, and bearing three inscriptions:

"Upon this tract of land, the Glebe Farm, and near this site, was located the First Church of the French Protestant Refugees. The present, or Fourth Church, was erected 1895 and dedicated April 13, 1896.

"This Memorial Erected by the Huguenot Society of the Founders of Manakinin the Colony of Virginia, 1936. Dedicated 1937.

"King William Parish, Manakintowne Church, authorized by9 an Act of the General Assembly held at Williamsburg, Virginia, December 5, 1700." 19

Approximately 800 persons stood near the Fourth Manakin Church in the spring sunshine of April 18, 1937 to witness the unveiling of the memorial to the small Huguenot band who had settled near the site 237 years before. One eyewitness was Dr. Henri Flournoy, a Swiss psychiatrist, descendant of one of the Manakin Huguenots and speaker at the dedication. Flournoy reported the events of the day to readers of th Journal de Geneve:

___ There has just taken place on a beautiful spring day, on the 18th of April, the unveiling of a memorial at Manakin in remembrance of the Huguenots... Up to now there has been only one small church made of wood, the first church being erected on that land by French Protestants, which marked the place where they lived; but this frail building was destroyed and rebuilt several times. Now, quite near, there rises a stone on which is carved the cross of the Huguenots. It rests on a pedestal on which are engraved a few commemorative inscriptions. The whole, of light granite, forms an ensemble with sober and imposing lines.

Sunday's demonstration unrolled in a grand and solemn manner. It had been organized through the efforts of Mme. McDougall of New York, assisted by several collaborators, among whom was Dr. Eggleston, President of Hampden-Sydney College, a learned historian. Several speeches were given by the authors, as well as by various notables belonging to ecclesiastical and intellectual circles. The governor of Virginia in his address insisted on the bonds which have for a long time united the French and American people and on the contribution France has made to the national life of the country. State senator Daniel, representing the President of the United States of America, read a special message in which Mr. Roosevelt expressed his congratulations and keen regret for being unable to attend the ceremonies in person.

About 800 people had gathered at Manakin by its single road which goes through woods. There remains absolutely nothing of the houses which the Huguenot colonists had constructed.

When the monument was unveiled, the going and coming of the crowd, the individual bits of conversation, the flags that floated in the breeze, and the hymns sung by school children brought great animation to the glade for a few hours. Then absolute silence returned. Henceforth, in the majestic solitude of that forest, there rises the granite cross beside the small chapel.

Those who had the privilege of attending the unveiling of the Manakin Monument will not be able to forget that beautiful ceremony, so original and distinctly American, but at the same time so grand and simple." 20 ___

Of the numerous ceremonial addresses on the occasion reported in words and photographs on the front page of the Richmond Ti.mis Pispatch, most memorable were the dedicatory remarks of Douglas Southall Freeman. The Virginia historian and journalist declared he had come to tell not of what the Huguenots had done but "what they had left for us to do" to maintain the spirit of tolerance left by them to the people of Virginia and the entire United States. Notwithstanding their emotional ties to their mother countries, other foreign peoples, like the Huguenots, willingly had become imbued with the spirit of America, and showed loyalty to their adopted country at critical times. While such persons deserved to be treated with the consideration which was their due, Freeman lamented a noticeable intolerance of spirit among certain Americans, referring particularly to anti-Semitism in the United States. Freeman saw a remarkable parallel between the exodus of the Huguenots from France in the late 17th century and the exodus set in motion in 1933 by the Nazi seizure of power in Germany. Freeman avowed that the country was "fortunate to have such members of the Jewish race as Dr. Einstein with us. The United States stands to benefit from these men in the same amount that Germany who drove them from their native country stands to lose... We could afford to cancel the German debt to the United States," Freeman concluded, "if that would guarantee the presence of these German scholars in our country." 21

No sooner was the erection of the monument assured than the Society came forth with still other commemorative projects, such as the creation of a national park featuring an exact reconstruction of the Huguenot settlement at Manakin towne or construction of a stone memorial chapel near the 1936 monument to serve as a convenient meeting place and repository for Huguenot records. Despite impressive political support from Virginia's congressional delegation, both U.S. Senators from Virginia, and the governor, and state legislature, nothing came of the park project.& Rather than erecting, as was first proposed, a stone chapel in the manner of an early 18ttrcentury French country parish church, the Society decided to provide generous financial help for construction of the fifth Manakin Church by the Manakin Episcopalian congregation in 1954. Located just to the west of the monument and chapel on land which is not included within the nominated acreage, the fifth Manakin Church is modeled after an English not French prototype—William Byrd's church at Westove—and is the first church at Manakin to be built of brick. 25

While several members of the Huguenot society immediately investigated the history and significance of the 1890s frame church building in the literature and proceedings of their annual meetings and committee reports, it appears not to have occurred to anyone to study the building in great detail until it was moved to its present location in 1985. While the symbolic value of the frame building was recognized as sufficiently important to deserve preservation both in 1954 and in 1985 through removal, no careful architectural inspection of its historic fabric took place until relatively recently when Calder Loth of the Division of Historic Landmarks and Edward Chappell of the Colonial Williamsburg Foundation examined it in 1985. Their study showed that the building incorporated structural members that apparently were salvaged from the 1730 Huguenot church of King William Parish as well as a large summer beam believed to have survived from the 1710 Huguenot church. If this hypothesis is correct, then the summer beam would be the oldest surviying architectural fragment of a Huguenot building in America."

Robert Allen Carter

=== ENDNOTES ===
1 H. R. McIlwaine, "The Huguenot Settlement At Manakin Towne", The Huguenot, No. 6 (1933), p. 68; C. MacLaren Brydon, "The Huguenots of Manakin Town and Their Times", The Huguenot, No. 7 (1933-35), p. 123.

2 McIlwaine, "The Huguenot Settlement At Manakin Towne", p.69

3 Ibid, p. 74.

4 Ibid, p. 76.

5 The Huguenot, No. 6 f19331, insert between pp. 86-87.

6 McIlwaine, OD cit, p. 76; Brydon, OD cit, p. 124

7 McIlwaine, "The Huguenot Settlement At Manakin Towne", p. 76; The Huguenot, No. 6 (1933), insert between pp. 66–67.

8 The Huguenot, No. 6 (19331, pp. 91–92.

9 Ibid, p. 212.

10 Ibid, p. 34.

11 The Huguenot, No. 7 (1933–35), p 147.

12 Ibid, p. 148.

13 The Huguenot, No. 8 (1935-371, p. 108.

14 Ibid, pp. 167–168.

15 Ibid, pp. 132–138.

16 The Huguenot, No. 6 (1933), p. 28.

17 Ibid, pp. 31.

18 Ibid, pp. 39, 59; The Huguenot, No. 7 (1933–35), pp. 33–35; The Huguenot, No. 8 (1935–37), p. 42.

19 The Huguenot, No. 8 (1935-371, Pp. 42, 68, 105.

20 Ibid, pp. 146–147

21 Richmond Times Dispatch, April 19, 1937.

22 The Huguenot, No. 8 (1935–37), pp. 107–108.

23 The Huguenot, No. 14 (1954), 68

24 Edward Chappell to Ryland Hughes, September 15, 1985, Virginia Division of Historic Landmarks File 72-93.

== Misc ==
Built in 1700 by French Huguenots, Protestant refugees, it was moved to its current location in 1710. It burned down in the Revolutionary War and was later rebuilt with parts of the original building. It is in what is called the Carpenter Gothic style. A new church was built next to this in 1954, and is the one still currently used.

It was added to the National Register of Historic Places in 1988.
