= Fife, Virginia =

Unincorporated community in Virginia, United States

Coordinates: 37.749389°N 78.061918°W

Fife is an unincorporated community in Goochland County, Virginia, United States. It is approximately 11.4 miles northwest of the county seat, Goochland, via Rte. 6. It has the oldest surviving Rosenwald school in the county, built in 1918 with assistance from Chicago philanthropist Julius Rosenwald. Second Union School is listed on the National Register of Historic Places.

== History ==
Variant names were "Fife's" and "Fifes". A post office called Fife's was established in 1827, named after the first owner of the village site. The name was changed to Fife in 1893.

The area was developed for agriculture, and many African Americans continued to work on former plantations into the 20th century. In the early 20th century, public education was segregated and schools for African Americans were underfunded. Julius Rosenwald, a Chicago philanthropist, began to work with Tuskegee Institute to support construction of new schools for rural African-American children in the South. Four were built in western Goochland County, and a total of 12.

Second Union School, located near the Second Union Baptist Church in Fife/Bula, is the last to survive nearly unchanged. It is the oldest Rosenwald school in the county.

The county sold the building to the church after closing the school in 1959, when students were moved to an integrated school nearby. Since the early 21st century, it has been adapted as a museum about education, called the Second Union (Rosenwald) School Museum.
