= Mount Bernard Complex =

Historic house in Virginia, United States

- U.S. National Register of Historic Places
- Virginia Landmarks Register
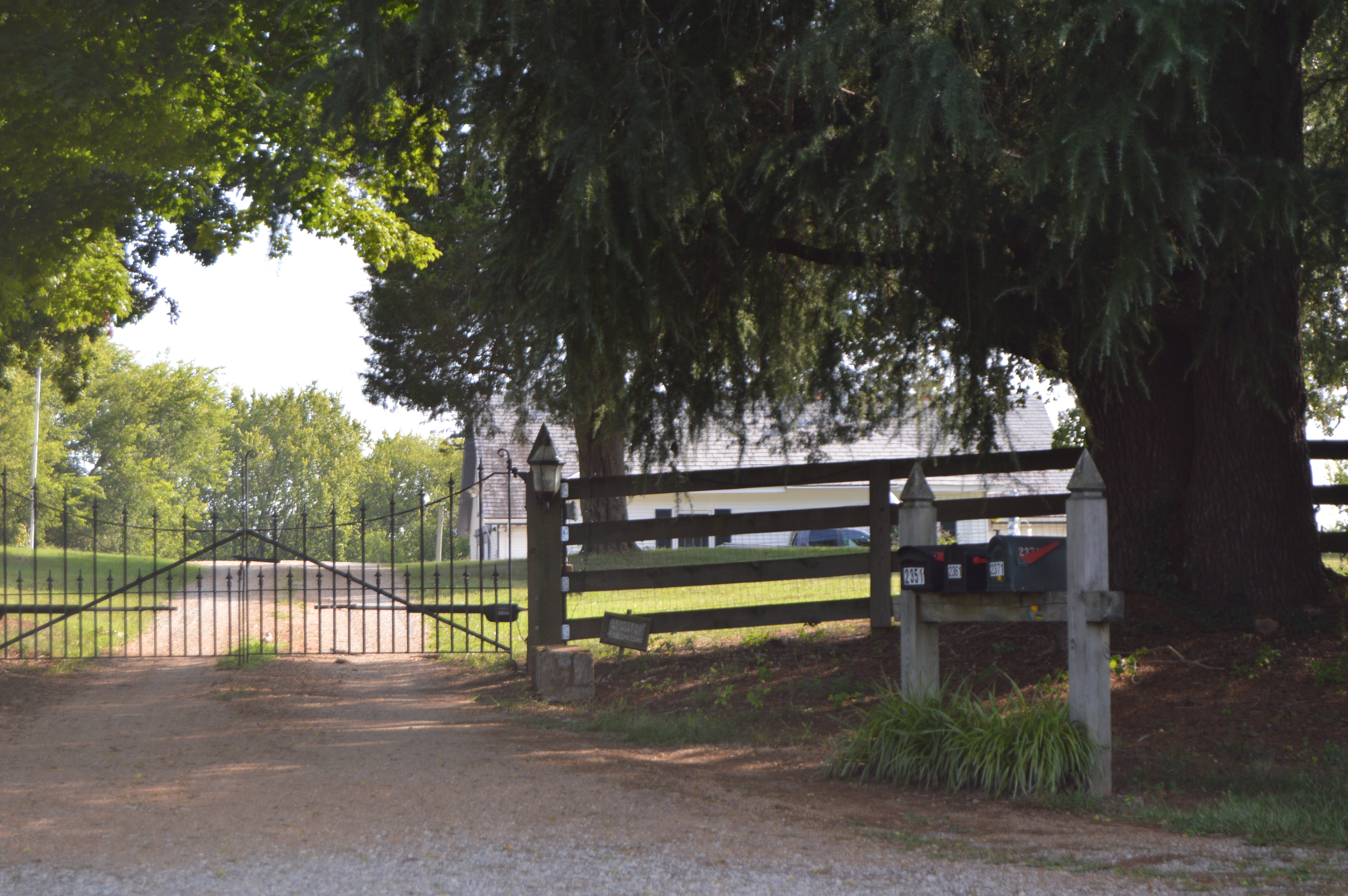
- Property entrance with outbuilding

- Location within Virginia Location within the United States
- Location: VA 6, 2371 River Rd. W, near Maidens, Virginia
- Coordinates: 37°39′21″N 77°51′38″W
- Area: 58.3 acres (23.6 ha)
- Built: c. 1850
- Architectural style: Classical Revival
- NRHP reference No.: 04001537
- VLR No.: 037-0038

Significant dates
- Added to NRHP: January 20, 2005
- Designated VLR: December 1, 2004

Mount Bernard Complex, also known as Lightfoot's Beaverdam Plantation and Kameschatka, is a historic plantation house and farm complex located near Maidens, Goochland County, Virginia. The main dwelling was built about 1850, and consists of a central gabled pavilion is flanked by subsidiary wings. It sits on a stone foundation dating to the 18th century. The house was altered in the 1920s in the Classical Revival style. Additions in the 1920s and 1940s to the sides and rear have subsequently turned the original T-shaped plan into a rectangle. Also on the property are the contributing two secondary dwellings, a slave quarters / kitchen, an ice house and cool chamber, a large barn / stable, two smaller stables, a corn crib, an equipment shelter, and a well house.

It was listed on the National Register of Historic Places in 2005.
