= Crozier, Virginia =

Unincorporated community in Virginia, United States

- Unincorporated community
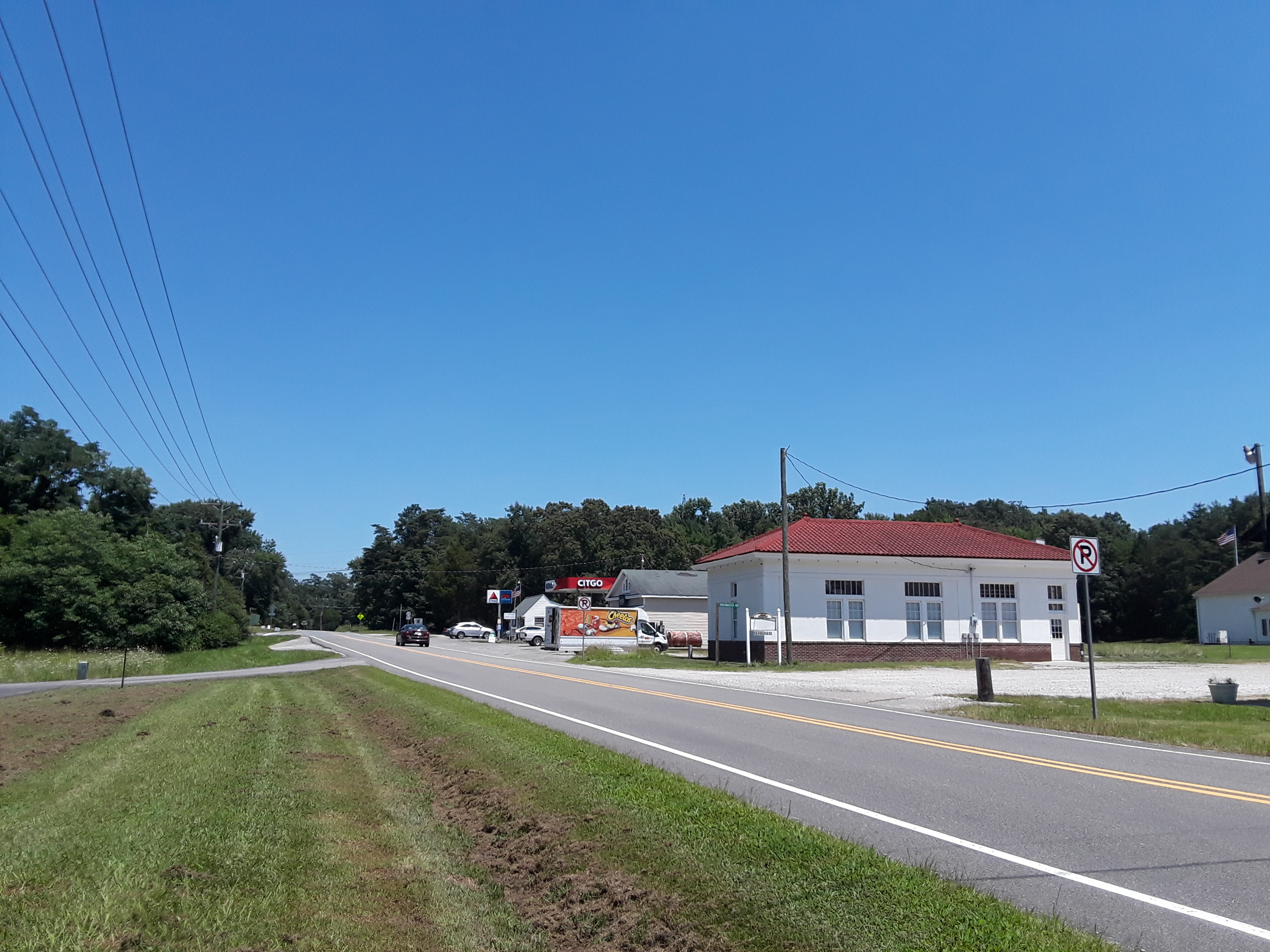
- Buildings in Crozier

- Location within Virginia Location within the United States
- Coordinates: 37°38′13″N 77°47′50″W
- Country: United States
- State: Virginia
- County: Goochland
- Elevation: 325 ft (99 m)
- Time zone: UTC-5 (Eastern (EST))
  - Summer (DST): UTC-4 (EDT)
- ZIP code: 23039
- Area code: 804
- GNIS feature ID: 1477238

Crozier is an unincorporated community in Goochland County, Virginia, United States. Crozier is located on Virginia State Route 6, about 5.8 miles (9.3 km) east-southeast of Goochland. Crozier has a post office with ZIP code 23039.

The First Union School, a Rosenwald school; and Springdale, a historic brick farmhouse built about 1800, are listed on the National Register of Historic Places.

Today, Crozier is the location of the Basic Correctional Officer's Academy. The state's Correctional Officers are trained here.

== Climate ==
The climate in this area is characterized by hot, humid summers and generally mild to cool winters. According to the Köppen Climate Classification system, Crozier has a humid subtropical climate, abbreviated "Cfa" on climate maps.

Climate data for Crozier, Virginia, 1991–2020 normals, extremes 1976–present
Month	Jan	Feb	Mar	Apr	May	Jun	Jul	Aug	Sep	Oct	Nov	Dec	Year
Record high °F (°C)	83 (28)	81 (27)	89 (32)	97 (36)	97 (36)	101 (38)	105 (41)	105 (41)	101 (38)	97 (36)	85 (29)	83 (28)	105 (41)
Mean daily maximum °F (°C)	45.9 (7.7)	49.5 (9.7)	57.3 (14.1)	68.1 (20.1)	75.2 (24.0)	82.9 (28.3)	86.8 (30.4)	85.8 (29.9)	79.3 (26.3)	69.0 (20.6)	58.3 (14.6)	49.2 (9.6)	67.3 (19.6)
Daily mean °F (°C)	35.9 (2.2)	38.5 (3.6)	45.2 (7.3)	55.4 (13.0)	63.6 (17.6)	72.1 (22.3)	76.3 (24.6)	75.0 (23.9)	68.4 (20.2)	56.9 (13.8)	46.6 (8.1)	39.1 (3.9)	56.1 (13.4)
Mean daily minimum °F (°C)	25.9 (−3.4)	27.5 (−2.5)	33.1 (0.6)	42.7 (5.9)	52.0 (11.1)	61.3 (16.3)	65.9 (18.8)	64.2 (17.9)	57.5 (14.2)	44.9 (7.2)	34.8 (1.6)	29.1 (−1.6)	44.9 (7.2)
Record low °F (°C)	−8 (−22)	−9 (−23)	1 (−17)	16 (−9)	23 (−5)	36 (2)	49 (9)	45 (7)	34 (1)	24 (−4)	10 (−12)	0 (−18)	−9 (−23)
Average precipitation inches (mm)	3.27 (83)	2.78 (71)	3.51 (89)	4.05 (103)	4.24 (108)	3.79 (96)	3.95 (100)	4.05 (103)	4.63 (118)	3.71 (94)	3.34 (85)	3.53 (90)	44.85 (1,140)
Average snowfall inches (cm)	3.0 (7.6)	3.6 (9.1)	1.5 (3.8)	0.1 (0.25)	0.0 (0.0)	0.0 (0.0)	0.0 (0.0)	0.0 (0.0)	0.0 (0.0)	0.0 (0.0)	0.0 (0.0)	2.0 (5.1)	10.2 (25.85)
Average precipitation days (≥ 0.01 in)	8.0	6.7	9.2	8.8	10.8	9.4	9.5	7.8	7.4	6.9	6.9	8.2	99.6
Average snowy days (≥ 0.1 in)	1.4	1.3	0.9	0.1	0.0	0.0	0.0	0.0	0.0	0.0	0.0	0.6	4.3
Source 1: NOAA
Source 2: xmACIS2
