= Dover Slave Quarter Complex =

Historic house in Virginia, United States

- U.S. National Register of Historic Places
- Virginia Landmarks Register
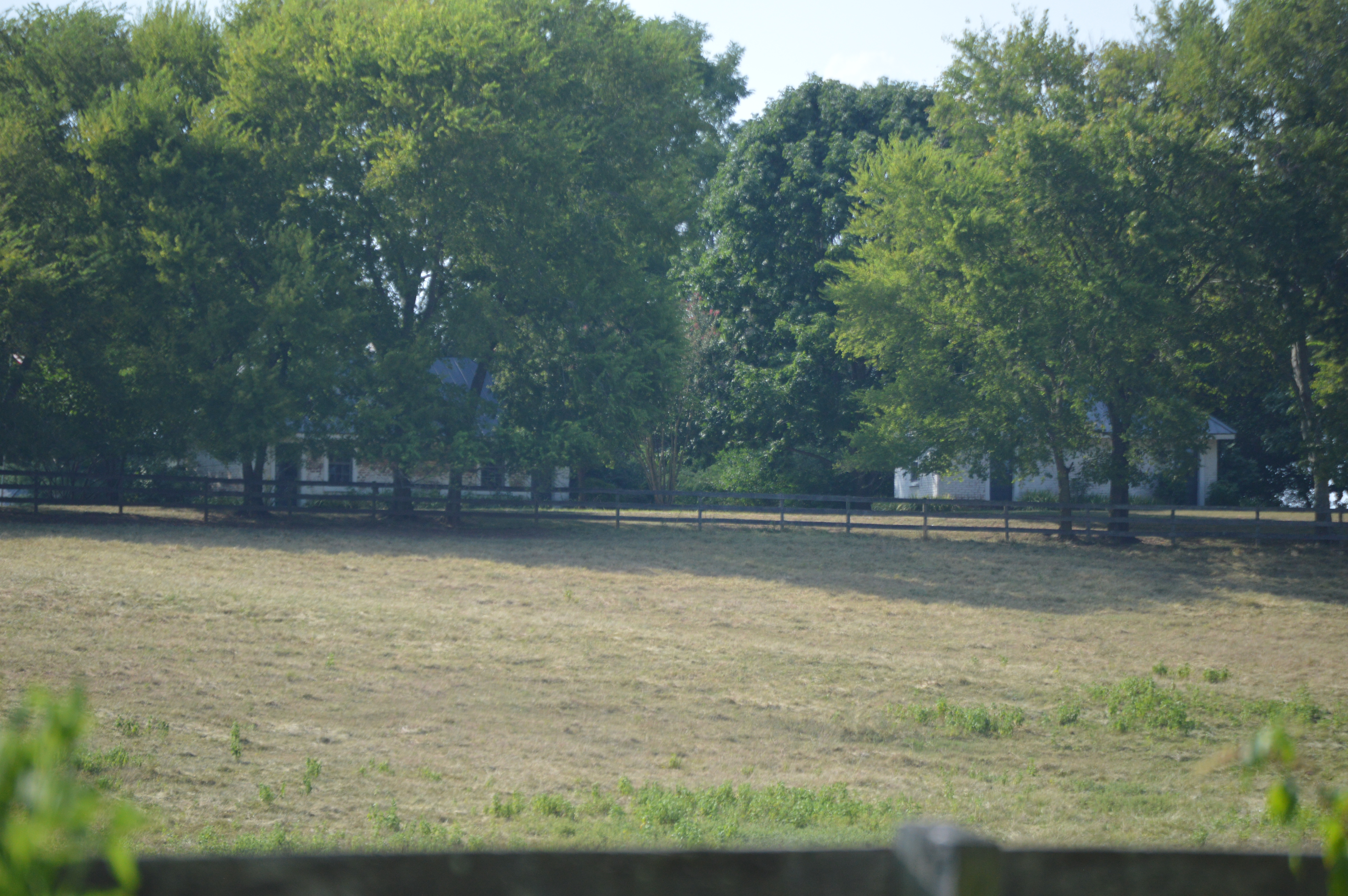
- Two of the houses

- Location within Virginia Location within the United States
- Location: 845 Dover Rd., Manakin-Sabot, Virginia
- Coordinates: 37°41′28″N 77°54′32″W
- Area: 309.5 acres (125.3 ha)
- Built: 1842
- Architectural style: Greek Revival
- NRHP reference No.: 02001005
- VLR No.: 037-5012

Significant dates
- Added to NRHP: September 15, 2002
- Designated VLR: March 14, 2001

The Dover Slave Quarter Complex is a set of five historic structures located on Brookview Farm near Manakin-Sabot, Goochland County, Virginia. They were built as one-story, two-unit, brick structures with steep gable roofs for housing African-American slaves. The houses are arranged in a wide arc, measuring 360 ft (110 m) in length. The center dwelling had a frame second-story added and its brick walls covered by siding when it was converted to an overseer's house. It has a recent rear addition.

In addition to the center dwelling, one of the former slave dwellings serves as the farm office, one serves as a woodworking shop, and the remaining two are used for storage. Also on the farm are the two early 20th-century contributing farm structures; one is an impressively long dairy barn, and there are two tenant houses, silos, and storage buildings.

The structures were listed as a group on the National Register of Historic Places in 2002.
