= Rochambeau Farm =

Historic house in Virginia, United States

- U.S. National Register of Historic Places
- Virginia Landmarks Register
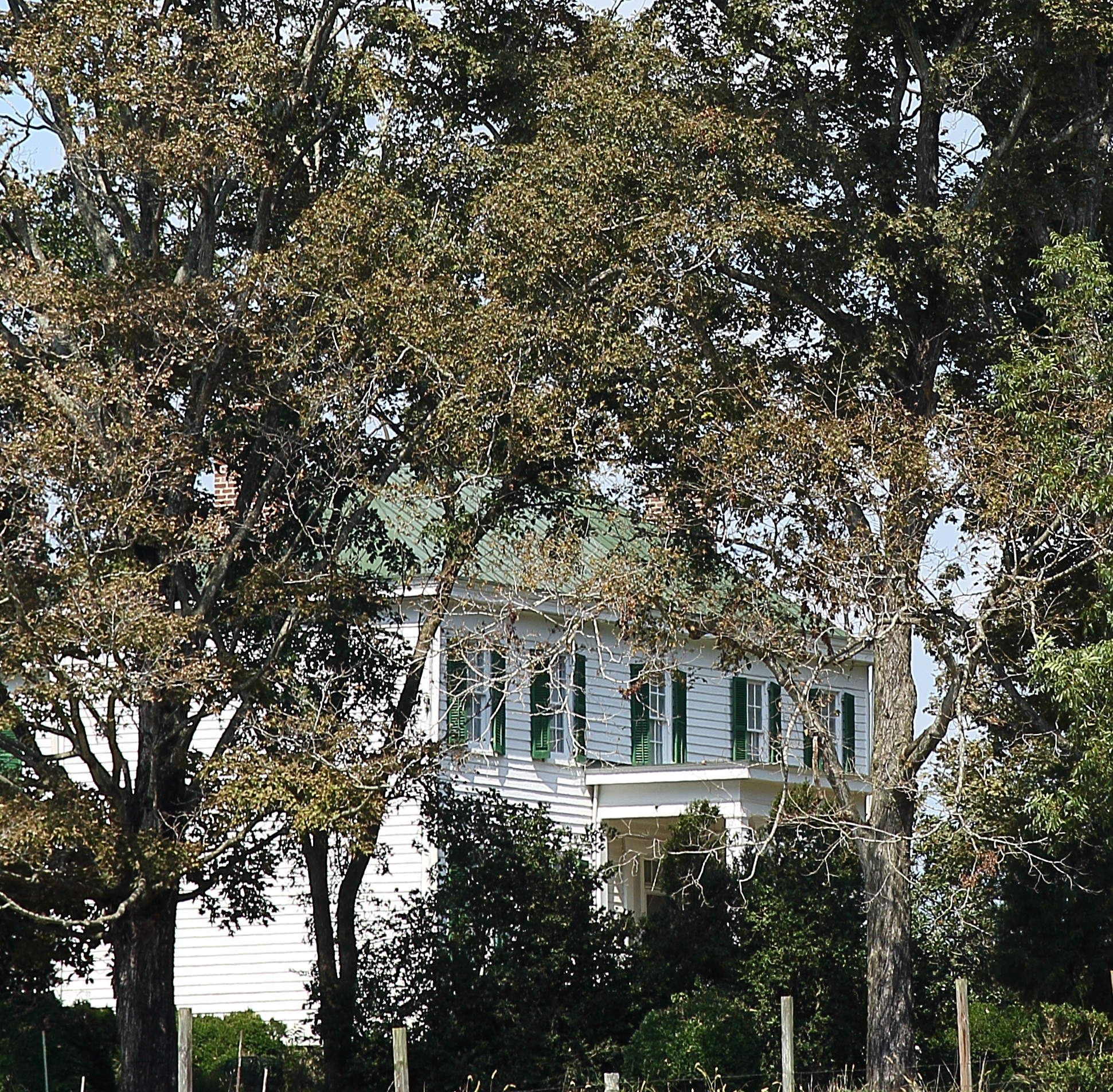

- Location within Virginia Location within the United States
- Location: 1080 Manakin Rd., Manakin-Sabot, Virginia
- Coordinates: 37°38′03″N 77°43′12″W
- Area: 35.7 acres (14.4 ha)
- Built: c. 1855
- Architect: Bowles and Cres
- Architectural style: Greek Revival
- NRHP reference No.: 99000969
- VLR No.: 037-0069

Significant dates
- Added to NRHP: August 5, 1999
- Designated VLR: September 14, 1998

Rochambeau Farm is a historic home and farm complex located near Manakin-Sabot, Goochland County, Virginia. The main dwelling was built about 1855, and is an L-shaped full two-story frame structure set on a common bond brick foundation in the Greek Revival style. It has a low hip roof and three single-story colonnade porches.

Also on the property are the contributing library (c. 1750–1810), the woodshed with a three-hole privy in the rear, the old smokehouse (now farm office) with attached toolshed, lumber shed, the garage, the new smoke house (1917/18), a chicken house, milk cow barn (near ruin), run-in shed, two-stall horse barn (near ruin), and hay storage barn (1965) with tack room (1997). One contributing structure and two contributing sites include the original farm house well, the site of the old ice house and the vegetable garden, containing an archaeological site.

It was named Rochambeau Farm by its 20th-century owner, Columbia Universityprofessor Raymond Weeks, a noted scholar of French literature. Weeks, who purchased the property in 1914, was an ardent supporter of the Allied cause during World War I; he chose the name to commemorate Comte de Rochambeau, who commanded the French forces of the Franco-American alliance during the Revolutionary War.

The property was listed on the National Register of Historic Places in 1999.
