= Tanglewood (Maidens, Virginia) =

Historic commercial building in Virginia, United States

- Tanglewood-037-5010
- U.S. National Register of Historic Places
- Virginia Landmarks Register
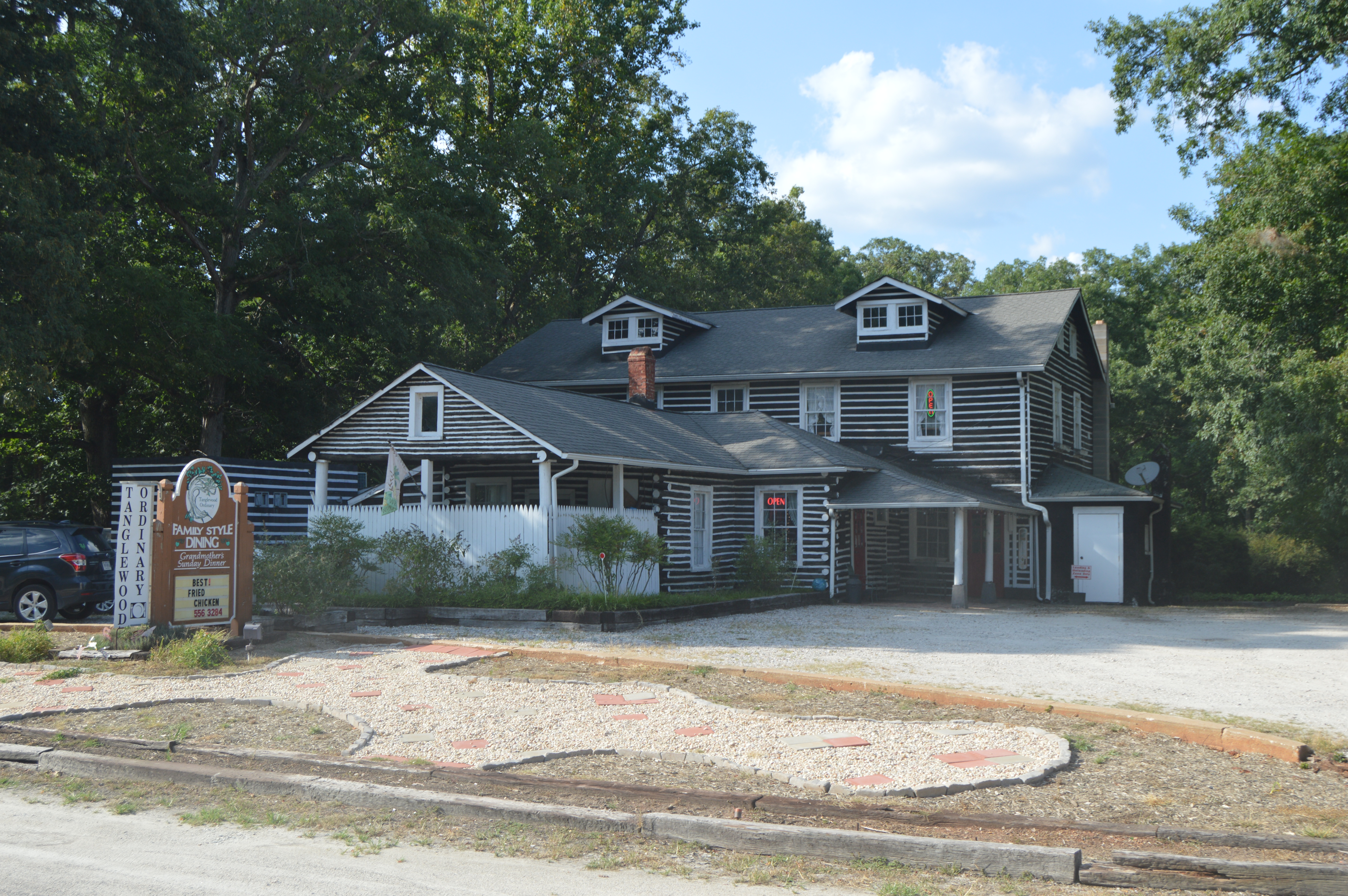
- Roadside view

- Location within Virginia Location within the United States
- Location: 2200-2210 River Rd W, near Maidens, Virginia
- Coordinates: 37°39′8″N 77°50′46″W
- Area: 3.8 acres (1.5 ha)
- Built: 1929
- Architect: Syme Barret, Morris Barret
- Architectural style: Log cabin
- NRHP reference No.: 02000775
- VLR No.: 037-5010

Significant dates
- Added to NRHP: July 11, 2002
- Designated VLR: September 12, 2002

Tanglewood, also known as Tanglewood Ordinary and Tanglewood Tavern, is a historic hotel and tavern located near Maidens, Goochland County, Virginia. The earliest section was built as a gas station in 1929. It is the front one-story projection. A large 2 1/2-story Rustic style log section was added in 1935. The rear addition was built as a restaurant / dance hall on the first floor and living quarters on the upper floors. A two-story "owners" house was built into a hillside behind Tanglewood in about 1950.

It was listed on the National Register of Historic Places in 2002.
