= Manakin Sabot, Virginia =

Unincorporated community in Virginia, US

Manakin Sabot
- Unincorporated community
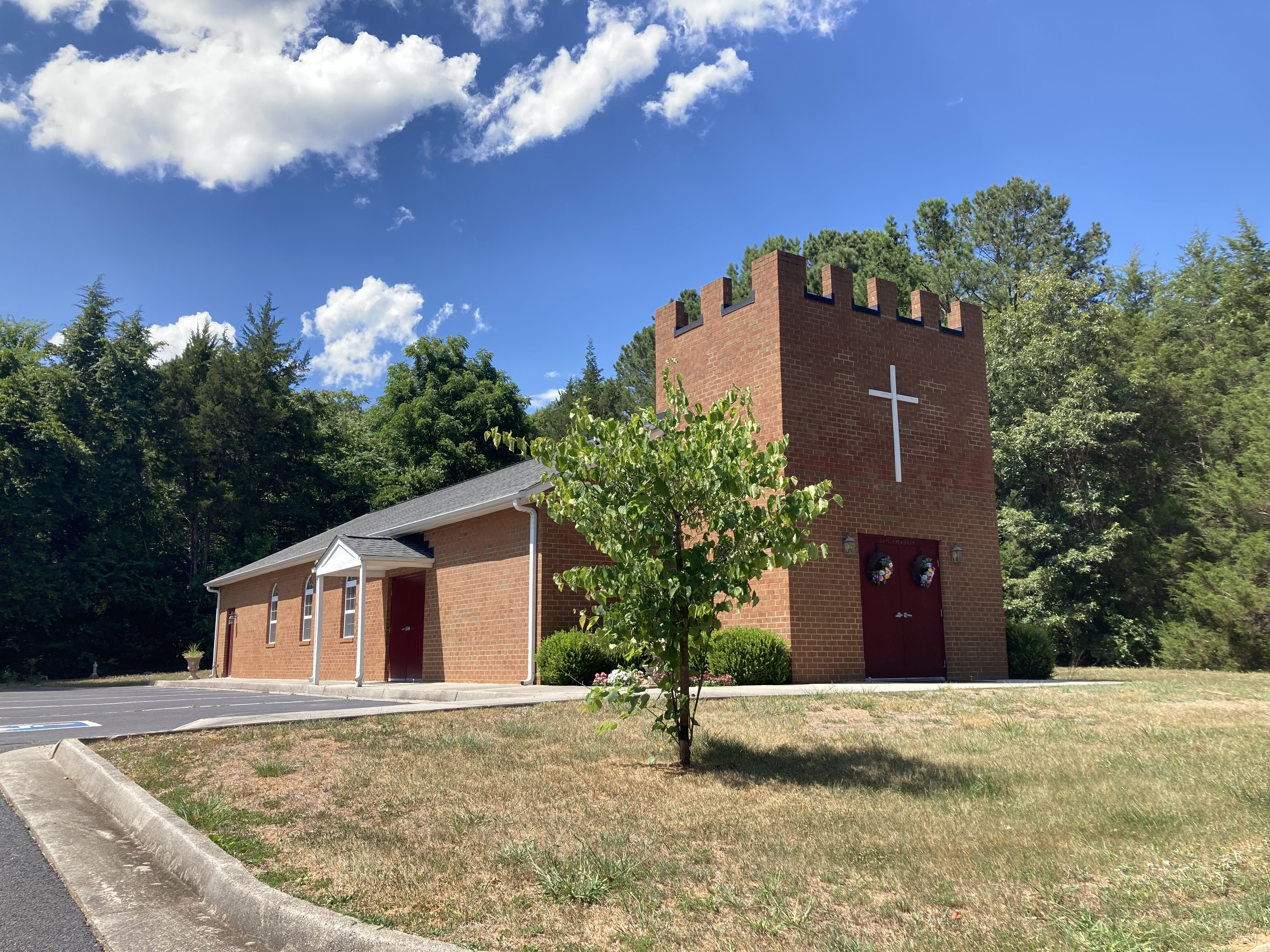
- St. Luke’s Anglican Church in Manakin Sabot

- Location within the Commonwealth of Virginia Manakin Sabot (the United States)
- Coordinates: 37°38′17″N 77°42′28″W
- Country: United States
- State: Virginia
- County: Goochland

Population (2010)
  - Total: 4,634
- Time zone: UTC−5 (Eastern (EST))
  - Summer (DST): UTC−4 (EDT)

Manakin Sabot, consisting of the villages of Manakin and Sabot, is an affluent unincorporated community in Goochland County, Virginia, United States. It is located northwest of Richmond in the Piedmont and is part of the Greater Richmond region.

== History ==
Before European colonists arrived, Native American Monacan people had cleared trees, farmed and constructed a village called Mowhemcho above the falls of the James River. It was the easternmost village of their confederacy, as noted on a map of Virginia in 1612 by Capt. John Smith. They were Siouan-speaking, like other tribes of the uplands west of the Tidewater region.

However, by 1699, that village had been abandoned for decades, possibly since Bacon's Rebellion. In that year the English King William III granted 10,000 acres of land in Virginia to the Marquis Olivier de la Muce, a French aristocrat and Huguenot who had been imprisoned in the Castle of Nantes on the Isle of Re before escaping to England some ten years earlier. Persecution of Huguenots and Waldensians had increased after French King Louis XIV revoked the Edict of Nantes in 1685 and his cousin Louis Amadeus, Duke of Savoy did similarly two years later.

Thus by 1701 several hundred Protestant religious refugees emigrated across the Atlantic Ocean based on the land promised from the British Crown. Four debarkations left Southampton for Virginia in the summer of 1699, with a total of more than 700 people. Names of three of the ships are known: Pierre and Anthony (a/k/a Galley of London), Le Nasseau and Mary and Ann. Four Huguenot ministers travelled with the expedition: Reverends James Fontaine, Benjamin de Joux, Louis Latane and Claude Philip de Richebourg. The names of two surgeons are also known: Doctors Chastaine and Paul Micou. While the refugees had expected to be settled near existing settlements of Jamestown or in Lower Norfolk County (both in the already settled Tidewater region), following the suggestion of influential William Byrd II, officials gave them land in the sparsely populated area 20 miles above the falls of the James River in the Piedmont. One French settlement in Powhatan County became known as Manakin Town (after the native tribe that had evacuated circa 1676); two villages in Goochland were Manakin and Sabot.

Virginia government officials welcomed the refugees, as many of them were ex-aristocrats and noblemen with education and wealth, which they had brought with them on their emigration from France. The Colony exempted the French Huguenots from taxation for a period of seven years. On arriving in Virginia, they displaced remaining natives and wrested homes and plantations out of the wilderness; they built a church, a school, a hospital, and a smithy.

The first group of Huguenots encountered great hardship, as many were urban people were unprepared for frontier conditions. French Huguenot leaders petitioned the government for more assistance as another ship of refugees landed at the Virginia Colony. Gradually the pioneers adapted and moved out of the village to their farms in the area. By 1750, the village was again defunct. Over the decades, the French and their descendants intermarried with English settlers. Many of their descendants moved west or south with other migrants, including into Kentucky and other areas.

Colonists increasingly developed the area as plantations, with planters shifting from tobacco to wheat and mixed crops in the eighteenth century as the market changed, and increasingly using enslaved labor. Ben Dover Farm, Dover Slave Quarter Complex, Huguenot Memorial Chapel and Monument, Oak Grove, Powell's Tavern, Rochambeau Farm, and Tuckahoe Plantation are significant sites, built mostly from the colonial through the mid-19th century. Some of these farms and plantations adapted yet remained agricultural into the 20th century. All are now listed on the National Register of Historic Places.

== Notable people ==
- John McGuire, U.S. representative, former Virginia state senator and Virginia state delegate
- Justin Verlander, Major League Baseball pitcher, was raised in Manakin-Sabot
