= Lock-Keeper's House (Cedar Point, Virginia) =

Historic house in Virginia, United States

- U.S. National Register of Historic Places
- Virginia Landmarks Register
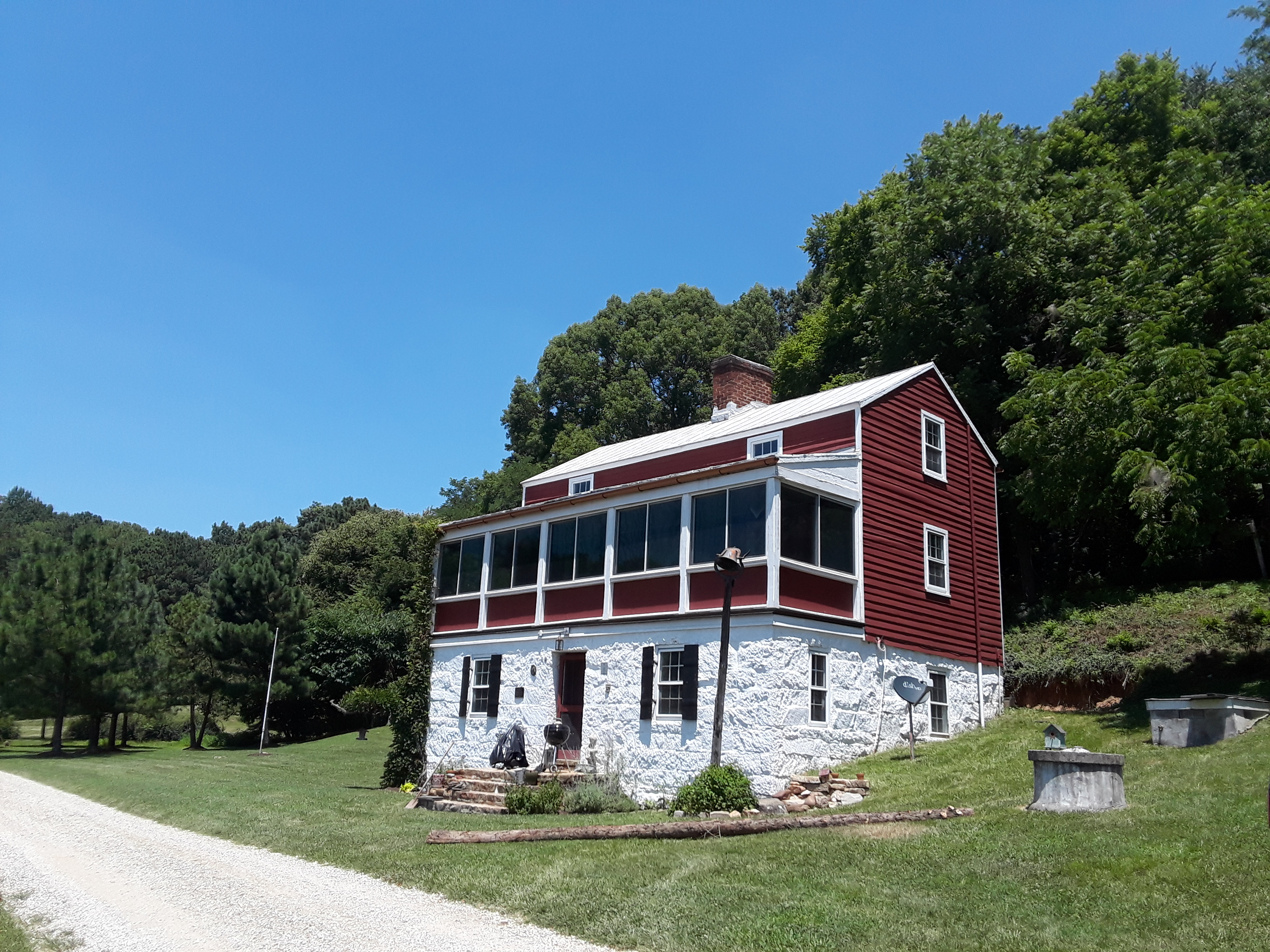
- 2018 photo

- Location within Virginia Location within the United States
- Location: Off VA 6 at James River, near Cedar Point, Virginia
- Coordinates: 37°41′28″N 77°54′32″W
- Area: less than one acre
- Built: c. 1836
- NRHP reference No.: 74002119
- VLR No.: 037-0105

Significant dates
- Added to NRHP: November 21, 1974
- Designated VLR: September 17, 1974

Lock-Keeper's House is a historic home located near Cedar Point, Goochland County, Virginia. It was built about 1836, and is a two-story frame structure resting on a stone foundation of whitewashed, rough-faced, uncoursed ashlar. It has a shallow gable roof and a shed roof porch that extends the length of the building. It was built to serve Lock Number 7 at Cedar Point and is the last remaining lock-keeper's house of the James River and Kanawha Canal system. It addition to being a residence, the lock-keeper's house served as a tavern and furnished accommodations for passengers and canal boat crews.

It was listed on the National Register of Historic Places in 1974.
