= Tinsley Tavern =

Historic commercial building in Virginia, United States

- U.S. National Register of Historic Places
- Virginia Landmarks Register
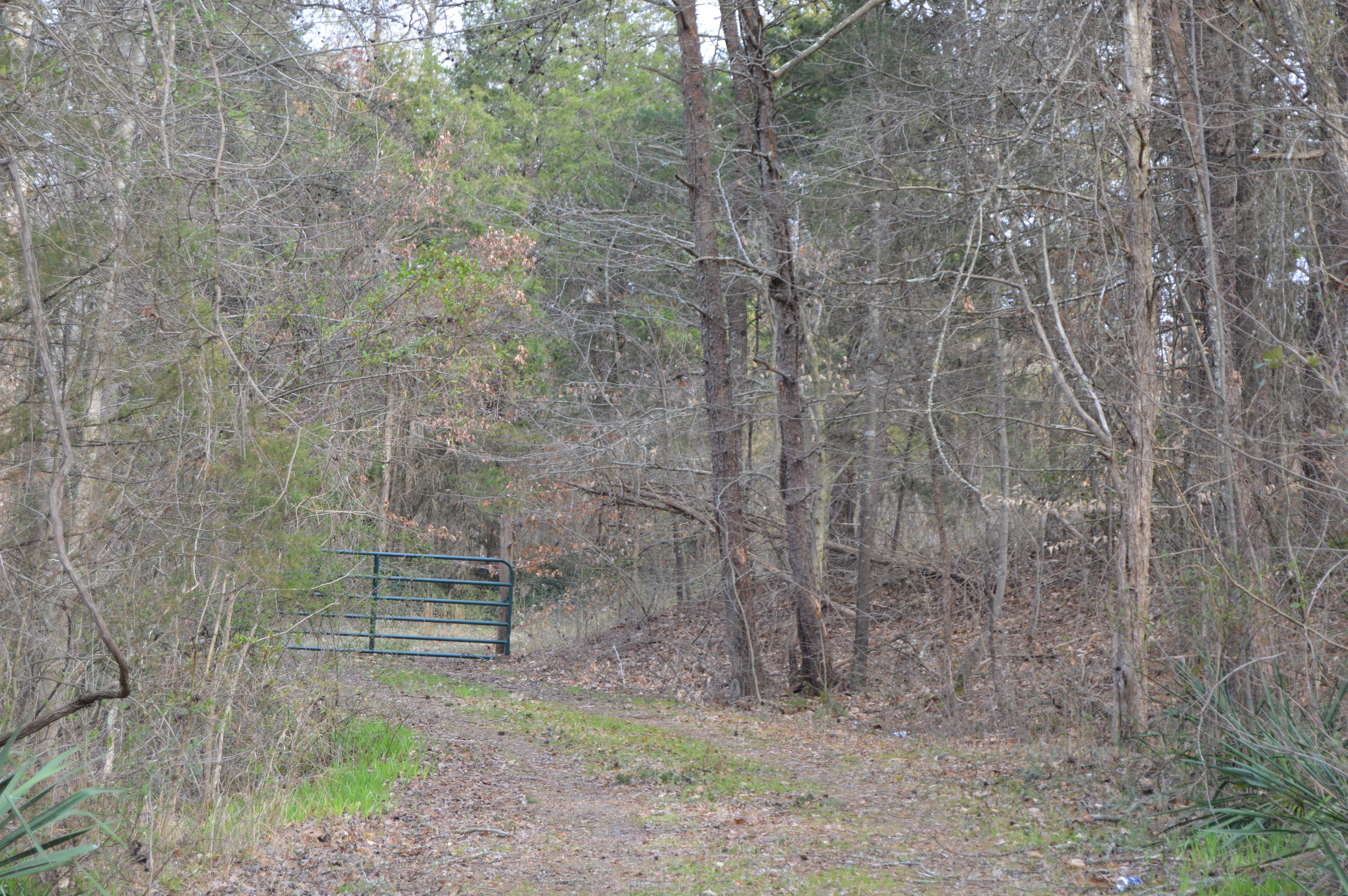
- Property entrance

- Location within Virginia Location within the United States
- Location: 2791 Elk Island Rd., near Columbia, Virginia
- Coordinates: 37°45′41″N 78°06′10″W
- Area: 11 acres (4.5 ha)
- Built: c. 1802, c. 1920
- Architectural style: Federal
- NRHP reference No.: 07000276
- VLR No.: 037-0032

Significant dates
- Added to NRHP: April 4, 2007
- Designated VLR: December 6, 2006

Tinsley Tavern, also known as Tinsleyville Tavern, is a historic inn and tavern located near Columbia in Goochland County, Virginia. It was built about 1802, and is a two-story, vernacular Federal period building. It has a center passage plan, and features wood-frame construction with weatherboard cladding. A 1 1/2-story, rear addition dates to about 1920. The building was used as a drover's tavern until 1836, after which it was occupied as a single family home.

It was listed on the National Register of Historic Places in 2007.
