= Cedar Point, Virginia =

Unincorporated community in Virginia, United States

- Unincorporated community
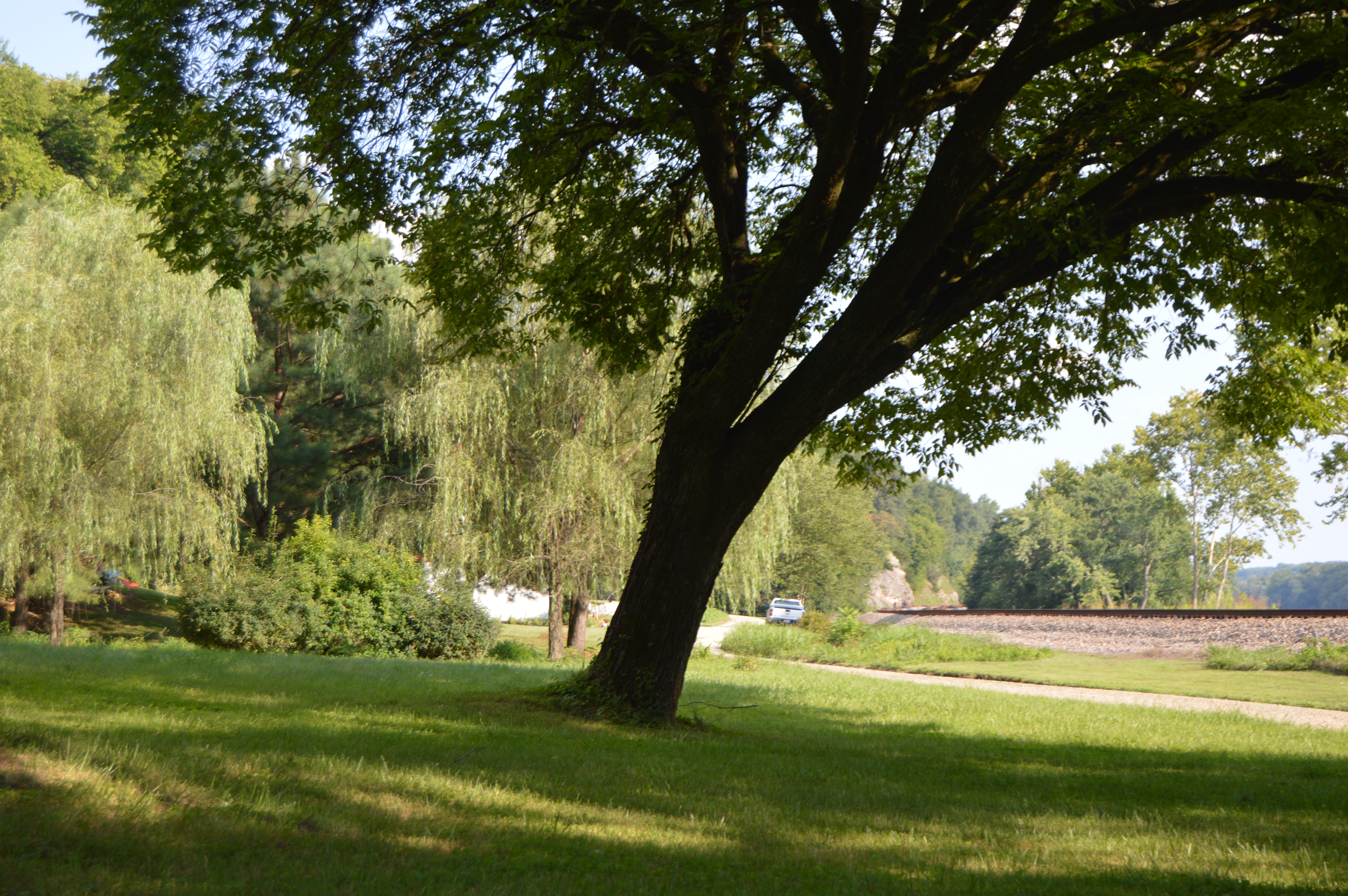
- Lock-Keeper's House near Cedar Point

- Location within Virginia Location within the United States
- Coordinates: 37°41′31″N 77°54′34″W
- Country: United States
- State: Virginia
- County: Goochland
- Elevation: 154 ft (47 m)
- Time zone: UTC-5 (Eastern (EST))
  - Summer (DST): UTC-4 (EDT)
- Area code: 804
- GNIS feature ID: 1494869

Cedar Point is an unincorporated community in Goochland County, Virginia, United States. Cedar Point is located on the James River, 1.4 miles (2.3 km) west of Goochland. The Lock-Keeper's House, which is listed on the National Register of Historic Places, is located near Cedar Point.
