= Springdale (Crozier, Virginia) =

Historic house in Virginia, United States

- U.S. National Register of Historic Places
- Virginia Landmarks Register
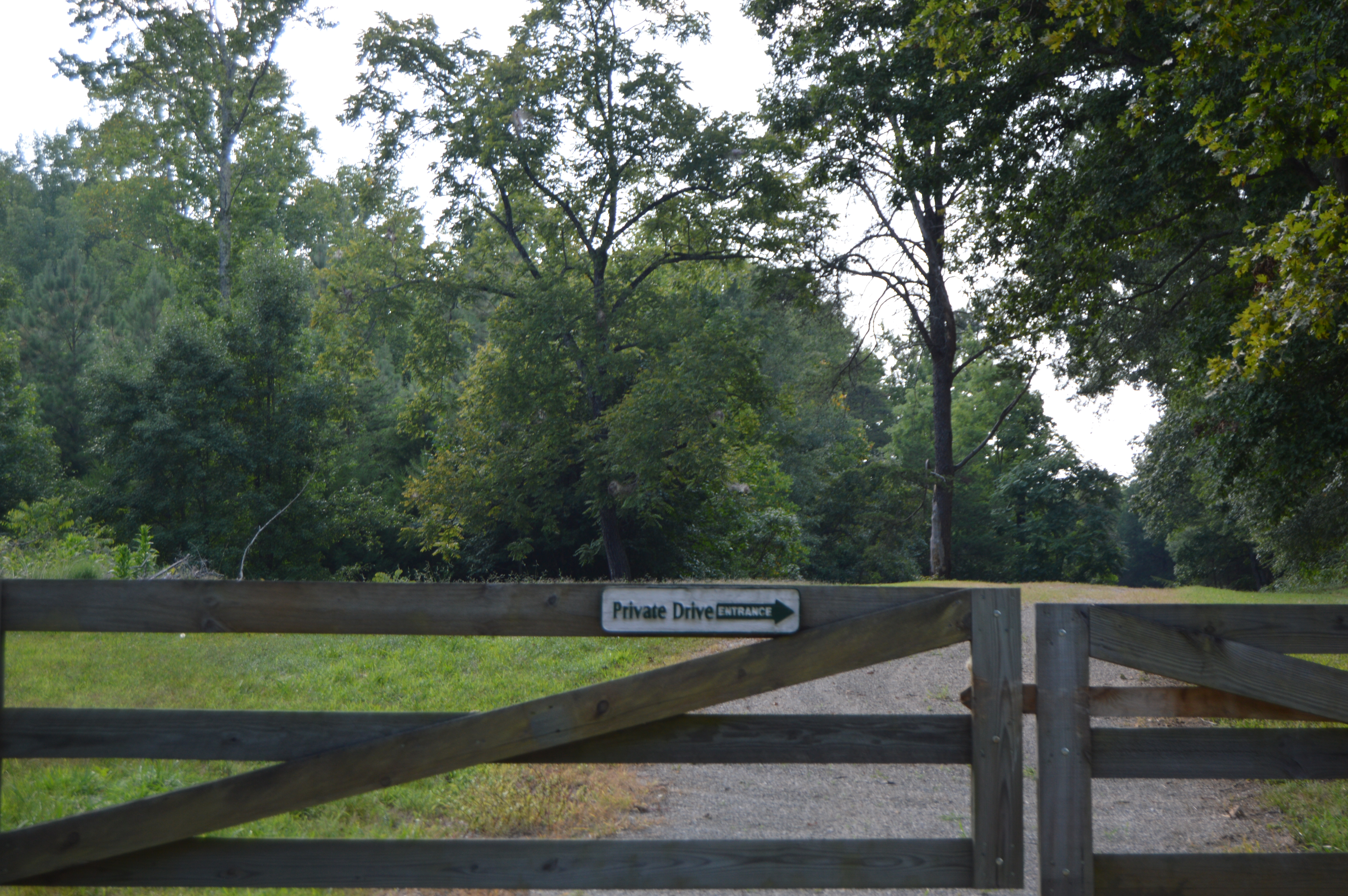
- Property entrance

- Location within Virginia Location within the United States
- Location: 2048 Cardwell Rd., Crozier, Virginia
- Coordinates: 37°41′21″N 77°47′24″W
- Area: 47.5 acres (19.2 ha)
- Built: c. 1800
- Architectural style: Federal, Colonial Revival
- NRHP reference No.: 02001490
- VLR No.: 037-0073

Significant dates
- Added to NRHP: December 4, 2002
- Designated VLR: September 11, 2002

Springdale is a historic home located at Crozier, Goochland County, Virginia. The original section was built about 1800. It is a two-story, three-bay, Federal period brick farmhouse with a frame addition. It is one of the few documented one-over-one-over-one houses in Goochland County.

It was listed on the National Register of Historic Places in 2002.
