= Oak Grove (Manakin-Sabot, Virginia) =

Historic house in Virginia, United States

- U.S. National Register of Historic Places
- Virginia Landmarks Register
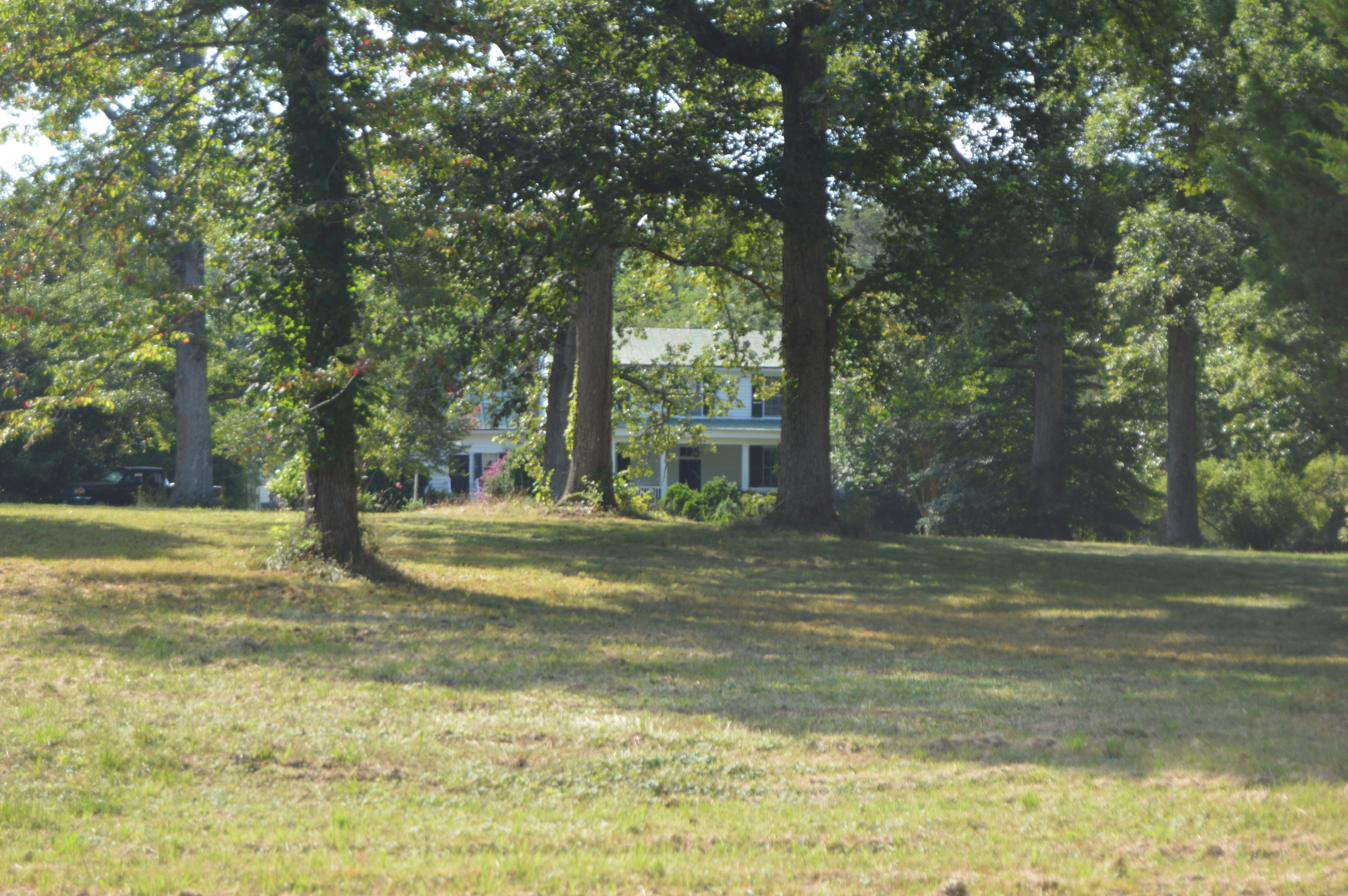
- Road view

- Location within Virginia Location within the United States
- Location: 664 Manakin Rd., Manakin-Sabot, Virginia
- Coordinates: 37°36′49″N 77°42′15″W
- Area: 6.2 acres (2.5 ha)
- Built: c. 1820, c. 1850, c. 1866
- Built by: Edwin J. DuVal
- Architectural style: Greek Revival
- NRHP reference No.: 09000727
- VLR No.: 037-0076

Significant dates
- Added to NRHP: September 16, 2009
- Designated VLR: June 18, 2009

Oak Grove is a historic home located near Manakin-Sabot, Goochland County, Virginia. The central block of the main dwelling was built about 1850 in the Greek Revival style. It is two stories high and three bays wide, and features a full-width front porch with Doric order-style square columns and engaged pilasters. A semidetached one-story, two-bay wing, was built about 1820, and a two-story, two-bay rear wing was added about 1866. Also on the property are the contributing one-story heavy timber frame meat house, a one-story frame barn, a brick-and-stone-lined circular well, and the stone foundations of two historic dependencies.

It was listed on the National Register of Historic Places in 2009.
