= Maidens, Virginia =

Unincorporated community in Virginia, United States

- Unincorporated community
- Location within Virginia Location within the United States
- Coordinates: 37°40′09″N 77°52′55″W
- Country: United States
- State: Virginia
- County: Goochland
- Time zone: UTC−5 (Eastern (EST))
  - Summer (DST): UTC−4 (EDT)

Maidens (or Maiden's Adventure) is a small unincorporated community in Goochland County, Virginia, United States. Sited on the north side of the James River, it is currently located at the junction of U.S. Route 522, State Route 6, and State Route 634.

== History ==
Maiden's Adventure was located along the James River and Kanawha Canal which opened in 1840. The new canal was part of a planned link between the Chesapeake Bay and the Atlantic Ocean via the James River and the Kanawha River, which would lead to the Ohio River, the Mississippi River, and the Gulf of Mexico. The canal was used by packet and freight boats which replaced the earlier shallow-draft batteau boats used before the canal for commerce. These boats brought goods and passengers to and from Richmond and points beyond.

Long a dream of early Virginians such as George Washington, who was a surveyor early in his career, the canal was never completed as envisioned, as the American Civil War (1861-1865) interrupted construction above Lynchburg and by then, railroads were becoming more numerous and popular.

After many years of attempts to compete successfully with the ever-expanding network of railroads, the James River and Kanawha Canal was conveyed to a new railroad company by a deed dated March 4, 1880. Railroad construction workers promptly started laying tracks on the towpath. The new Richmond and Allegheny Railroad offered a water-level route from the Appalachian Mountains just east of West Virginia near Jackson's River Station (now Clifton Forge) through the Blue Ridge Mountains at Balcony Falls to Richmond. In 1888 the railroad was leased, and later purchased, by Collis P. Huntington's Chesapeake and Ohio Railway (C&O), which named the local station "Maidens".

In 1969, the C&O station at Maidens was badly damaged and the highway bridge across the river destroyed by the flooding in the aftermath of Hurricane Camille.

The Mount Bernard Complex and Tanglewood are listed on the National Register of Historic Places.

== See also ==
- List of unincorporated communities in Virginia
