= First Union School (Crozier, Virginia) =

- U.S. National Register of Historic Places
- Virginia Landmarks Register
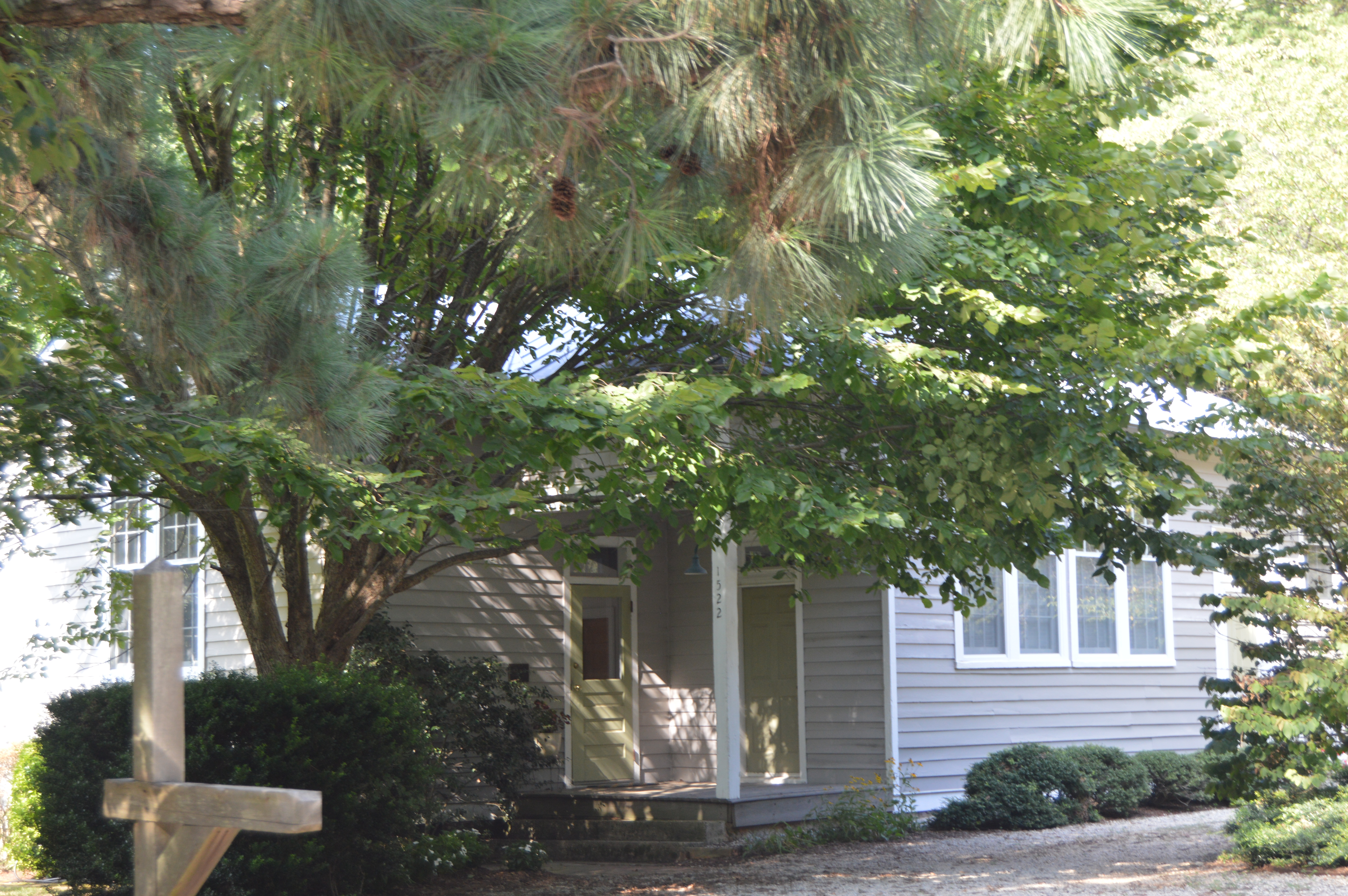
- Front

- Location within Virginia Location within the United States
- Location: 1522 Old Mill Rd., Crozier, Virginia
- Coordinates: 37°39′12″N 77°47′28″W
- Area: less than one acre
- Built: 1926
- MPS: Rosenwald Schools in Virginia MPS
- NRHP reference No.: 09000614
- VLR No.: 037-5016

Significant dates
- Added to NRHP: August 12, 2009
- Designated VLR: June 18, 2009

The First Union School is a historic Rosenwald school building for African-American children located at 1522 Old Mill Rd. in Crozier, Virginia. It was built in 1926, as a two-teacher school. It is a one-story frame school on a concrete foundation. It has an engaged porch and hipped roof. The listing included two contributing buildings. The school operated until December 1958, when the county integrated its public schools. It was converted to residential use in 1985.

It was listed on the National Register of Historic Places in 2009.

== See also ==
- Second Union School, also NRHP-listed
