= Second Union School =

- U.S. National Register of Historic Places
- Virginia Landmarks Register
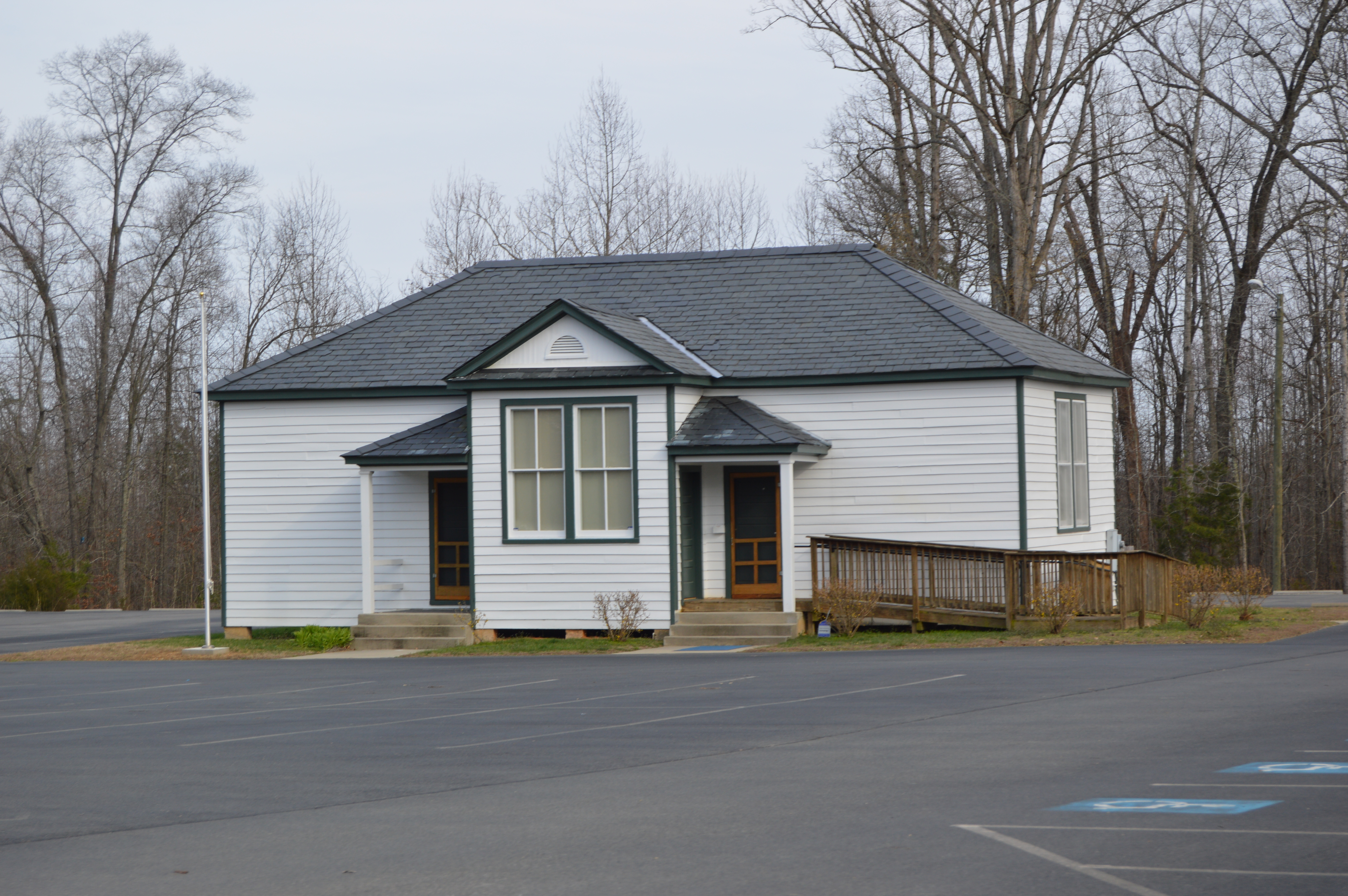
- Front and southern side

- Location within Virginia Location within the United States
- Location: 2787 Hadensville Fife Rd., Goochland, Virginia
- Coordinates: 37°45′52″N 78°3′10″W
- Area: 1.3 acres (0.53 ha)
- Built: 1918
- MPS: Rosenwald Schools in Virginia MPS
- NRHP reference No.: 05001583
- VLR No.: 037-5051

Significant dates
- Added to NRHP: January 31, 2006
- Designated VLR: December 7, 2005

The Second Union School is a historic Rosenwald school building for African-American children located near Fife, in western Goochland County, Virginia. It was built in 1918, as a two-teacher school, near Second Union Baptist Church, which had been founded in 1865 as an independent black congregation.

== Description and history ==
Located on the east side of Hadensville Fife Road (Va. Route 606), the school is a one-story, two-room, weather-boarded building with a hipped slate roof. It is set on its original foundation of 18 concrete piers. Built in 1918 according to plans developed by the Tuskegee Institute, it was designed as a two-teacher school. Movable dividers were used to define the interior spaces. It was located near Second Union Baptist Church, an independent black congregation that had organized in 1865 after the Civil War.

This is one of four schools built in the area for rural black children, under a matching program sponsored by philanthropist Julius Rosenwald from Chicago. A total of ten were constructed in the county. The school operated with black teachers and students until 1959, when the public schools in the county were integrated.

At that time, the county school board sold the building to Second Union Church, which used it for their Sunday school and Bible school classes.

This is the oldest Rosenwald school in the county that survives nearly unchanged and on its original site. It was listed on the National Register of Historic Places in 2006. Second Union Church, the county, and Goochland County Historical Society committed to restoring the building for use as a museum of black history in the county, with an emphasis on education.

In 2007 the state approved a commemorative highway marker for the school. In addition, the county public school system turned over artifacts to museum organizers from the historic middle school, operated for a period as the segregated Central High School. In 2009 the school received a grant from the National Trust for Historic Preservation to aid in needed repairs and renovation for continued use, part of a two-year round of grants to preserve Rosenwald schools.

In 2016, the Virginia Association of Museums recognized the former school as a museum. Second Union (Rosenwald) School Museum and the Goochland County public schools work together by incorporating the museum's history in the Standards of Learning (SOLs). The museum is open to the public.

== See also ==
- First Union School (Crozier, Virginia)
