= Brightly =

Historic house in Virginia, United States

- U.S. National Register of Historic Places
- Virginia Landmarks Register
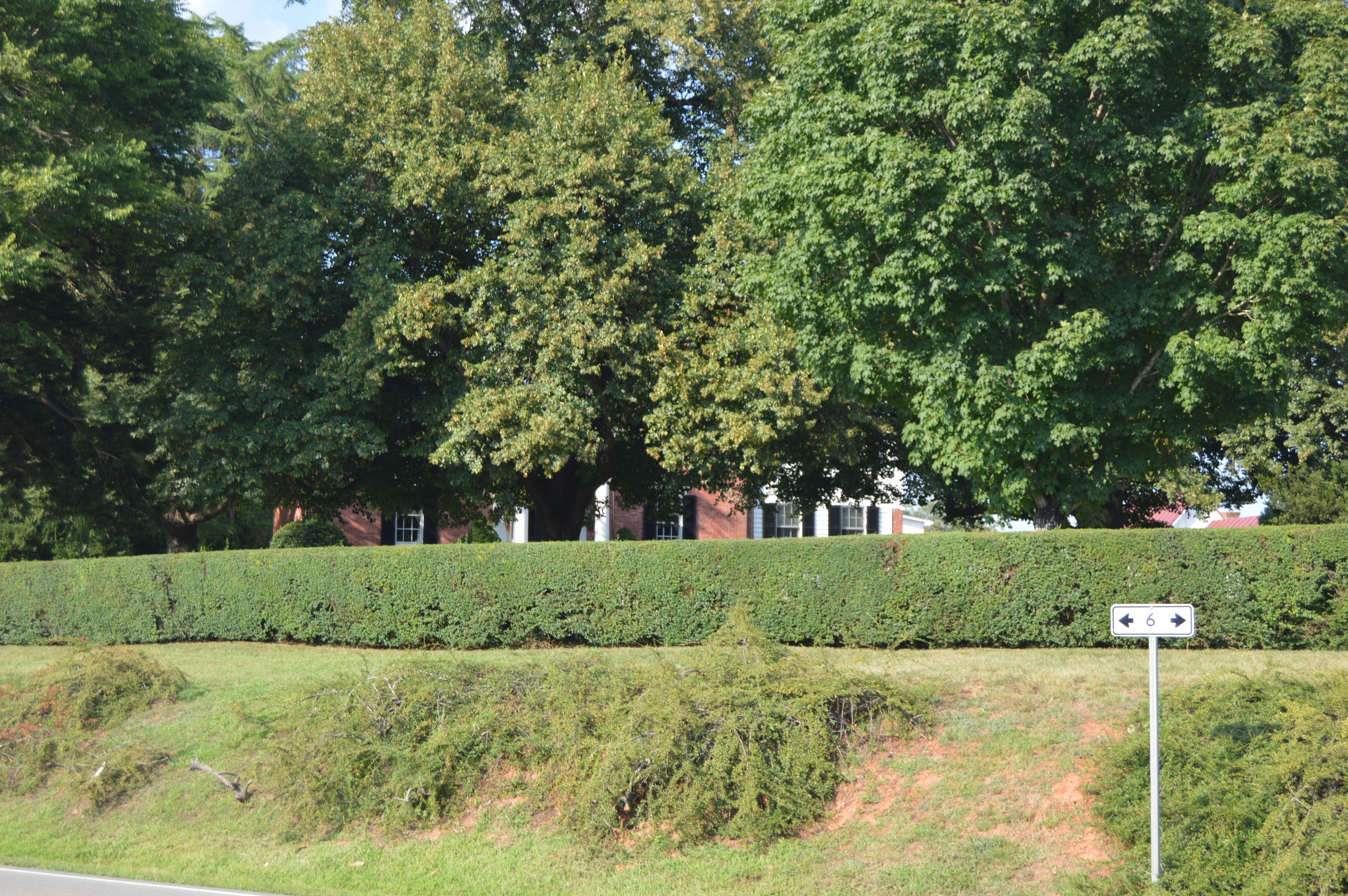
- Roadside view

- Location within Virginia Location within the United States
- Location: 2844 River Rd W, near Goochland, Virginia
- Coordinates: 37°40′38″N 77°52′59″W
- Area: 31 acres (13 ha)
- Built: c. 1842
- Architectural style: Greek Revival
- NRHP reference No.: 06000705
- VLR No.: 037-0004

Significant dates
- Added to NRHP: August 16, 2006
- Designated VLR: June 8, 2006

Brightly is a historic plantation house located near Goochland, Goochland County, Virginia. The main dwelling was built about 1842, and is a two-story, single pile, central-passage-plan, gable-roofed brick dwelling in the Greek Revival style. The front facade features a one-story, one-bay Greek Revival Doric order porch. Also on the property are the contributing pair of slave dwellings, privy, granary, chicken house, barn, well house, windmill, cemetery and the gate posts.

The house now serves as a small bed and breakfast.

It was listed on the National Register of Historic Places in 2006.
