= Powell's Tavern =

Historic commercial building in Virginia, United States

- U.S. National Register of Historic Places
- Virginia Landmarks Register
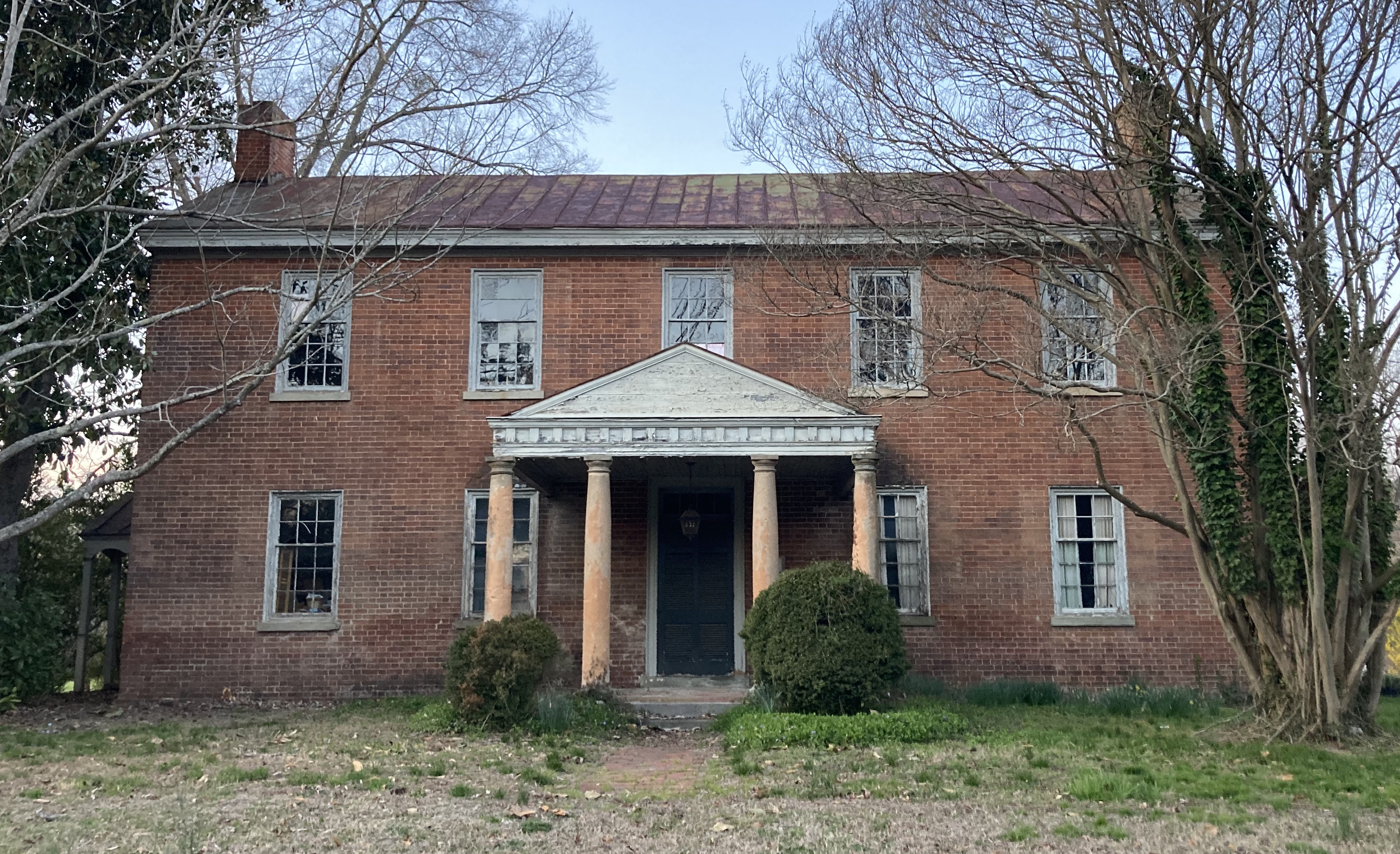
- South Face of Powell's Tavern in 2022

- Location within Virginia Location within the United States
- Location: On VA 650, Manakin, Virginia
- Coordinates: 37°34′57″N 77°39′37″W
- Area: 9.9 acres (4.0 ha)
- Built: 1808
- NRHP reference No.: 73002020
- VLR No.: 037-0023

Significant dates
- Added to NRHP: April 2, 1973
- Designated VLR: April 18, 1972

Powell's Tavern is a historic inn and tavern located at Manakin, Goochland County, Virginia. The earliest section was built about 1808, with additions made by 1815 and 1820. It is a two-story, H-shaped brick and frame building. The original section is a two-story frame block with a gable roof and two low one-story wings with shed roofs. It is connected to the later two-story, five-bay brick section by a two-story hyphen added in 1958.

It was listed on the National Register of Historic Places in 1973.
