= Ben Dover (Manakin-Sabot, Virginia) =

Historic house in Virginia, United States

- U.S. National Register of Historic Places
- U.S. Historic district
- Virginia Landmarks Register
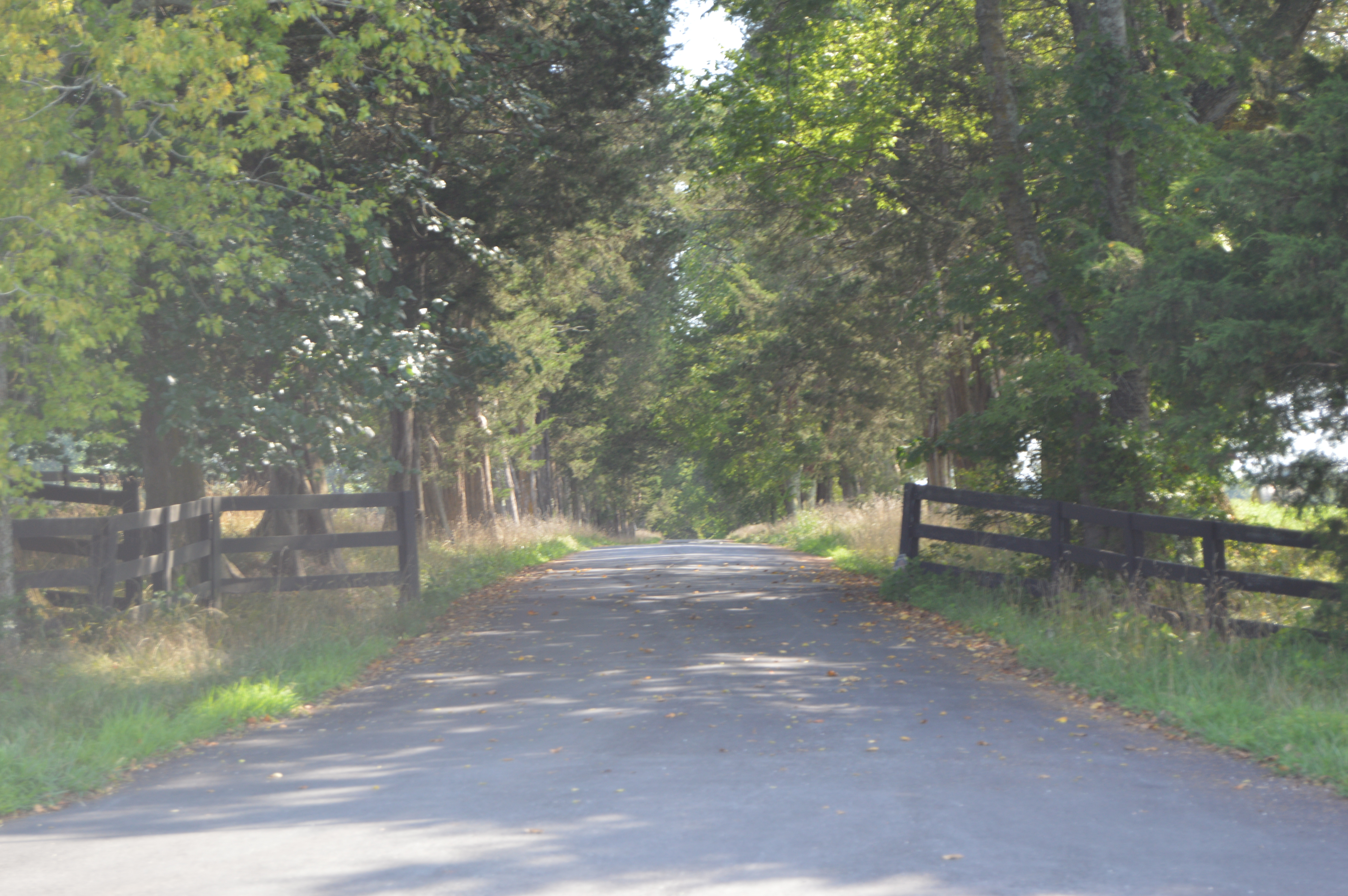
- Property entrance

- Location within Virginia Location within the United States
- Location: 661 River Rd. W #36, Manakin-Sabot, Virginia
- Coordinates: 37°36′24″N 77°44′39″W
- Area: 193.9 acres (78.5 ha)
- Built: 1853
- Architectural style: Italianate, Colonial Revival
- NRHP reference No.: 00000311
- VLR No.: 037-0078

Significant dates
- Added to NRHP: April 14, 2000
- Designated VLR: June 17, 1998

Ben Dover, also known as Ben Dover Farm, is a historic home and plantation complex, recognized as a national historic district, located near Manakin-Sabot in Goochland County, Virginia, United States. The district encompasses 13 contributing buildings, 8 contributing sites, and 10 contributing structures.

== History ==
Built in 1853 for William Beverley Stanard on the Dover Plantation and named Ben Dover because the farm was at the bend of the river.

The farm's most notable inhabitant, William T. Reed, Sr., who bought several nearby properties and used them as a rural retreat, was a close advisor to Governor Harry Byrd, and transformed the Italian Villa house into a 1920s Colonial Revival mansion.

Charles Lindbergh landed his plane in a Ben Dover field during one of his many visits with Reed.

== Site ==
The farm's original patentee in 1715, John Woodson, built a water-powered mill on this part of his plantation, which was still operated in the early 1900s.

The main dwelling was built in 1853 as a villa or the Big House of the plantation, in an Italianate style. When renovated in 1930, it was transformed when given a Colonial Revival facade to mask decades of deterioration and poor patchwork.

Contributing buildings, many of later construction, include tenant houses, a converted servants quarters (former slave quarters), a garage, a number of barns and sheds, a bowling alley, a smokehouse, and a stable. Contributing structures include three water towers, two well houses, animal feeders, a chicken coop, a silo and a swimming pool. The eight sites include stone foundations or sites of buildings no longer standing. Among these sites are two ruinous barns, a bridge ruin, an old road trace, and remains of landscape terracing. Together they represent the evolution of the Virginia plantation from the mid-19th century to the present day farm.

It was listed on the National Register of Historic Places in 2000.
