= Rock Castle (estate) =

Historic house in Virginia, United States

- U.S. National Register of Historic Places
- Virginia Landmarks Register
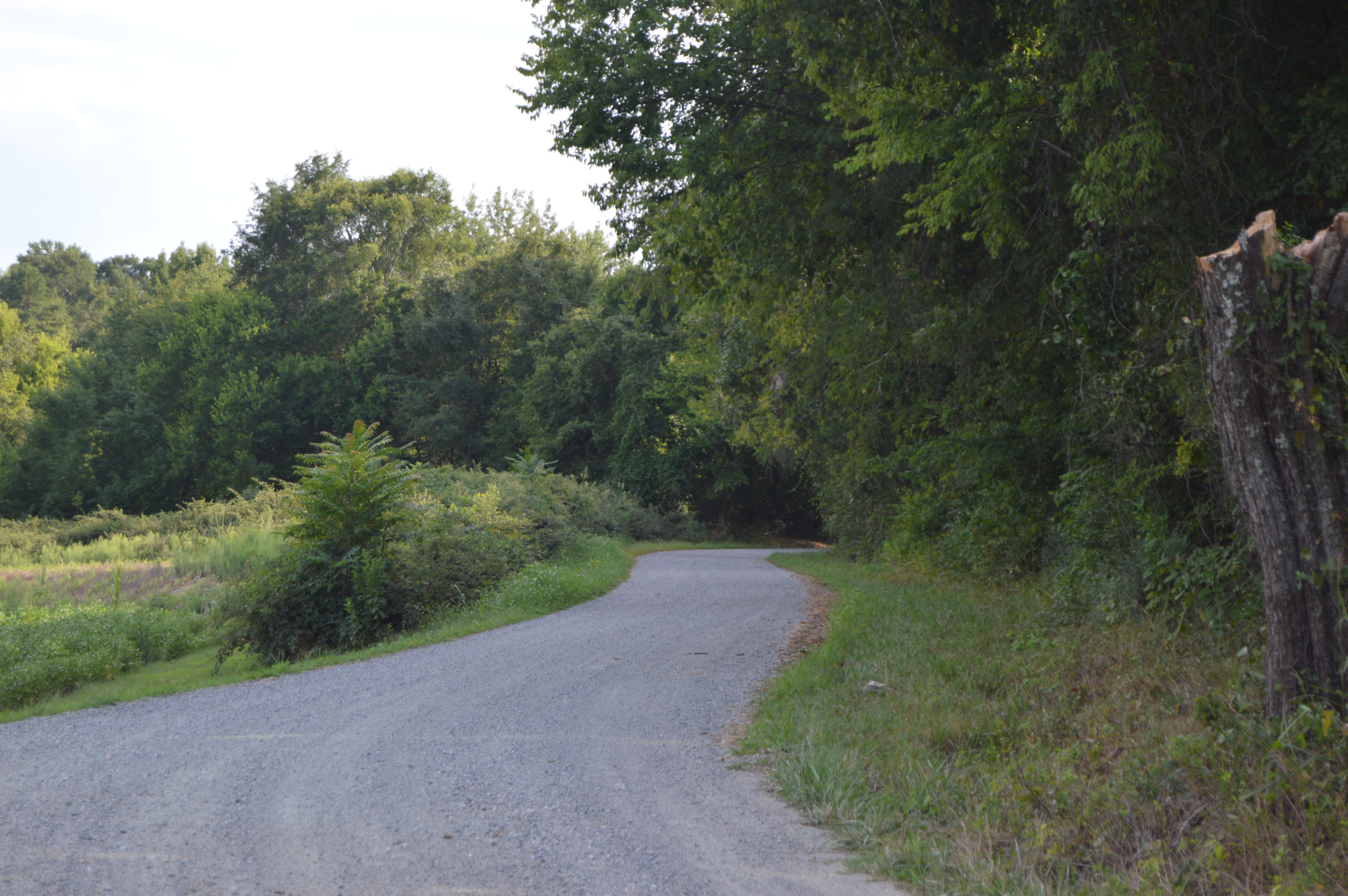
- Estate entrance

- Location within Virginia Location within the United States
- Location: SR 600, Rock Castle, Virginia
- Coordinates: 37°38′01″N 77°59′10″W
- Area: 460 acres (190 ha)
- NRHP reference No.: 70000798
- VLR No.: 037-0054

Significant dates
- Added to NRHP: September 15, 1970
- Designated VLR: July 7, 1970

Rock Castle is an historical estate located at Rock Castle, Goochland County, Virginia. Located on the Rock Castle property is the Queen Anne Cottage. It is a small, five-bay, 1 1/2-story frame structure with clipped gable ends and two interior end chimneys. The house was built prior to 1732. In 1843 Rock Castle was purchased by John Rutherfoord, Governor of Virginia from 1841 to 1842.

It was listed on the National Register of Historic Places in 1970.
