= Rock Castle, Virginia =

Rock Castle
- Unincorporated community
- Location within the Commonwealth of Virginia
- Coordinates: 37°37′37″N 77°58′48″W
- Country: United States
- State: Virginia
- County: Goochland
- Time zone: UTC-5 (Eastern (EST))
  - Summer (DST): UTC-4 (EDT)

Rock Castle, Virginia is a populated locality in Goochland County, Virginia, United States of America. "Rock Castle", an estate listed on the National Register of Historic Places is in located in Rock Castle.
