= Hadensville, Virginia =

Unincorporated community in Virginia, United States

- Unincorporated community
- Location within Virginia Location within the United States
- Coordinates: 37°49′32″N 77°59′58″W
- Country: United States
- State: Virginia
- County: Goochland
- Elevation: 390 ft (120 m)
- Time zone: UTC-5 (Eastern (EST))
  - Summer (DST): UTC-4 (EDT)
- ZIP code: 23067
- Area code: 804
- GNIS feature ID: 1475786

Hadensville is an unincorporated community in Goochland County, Virginia, United States. Hadensville is 11.6 miles (18.7 km) north-northwest of Goochland. Hadensville has a post office with ZIP code 23067.
