= Bolling Hall (Goochland, Virginia) =

Historic house in Virginia, United States

- U.S. National Register of Historic Places
- Virginia Landmarks Register
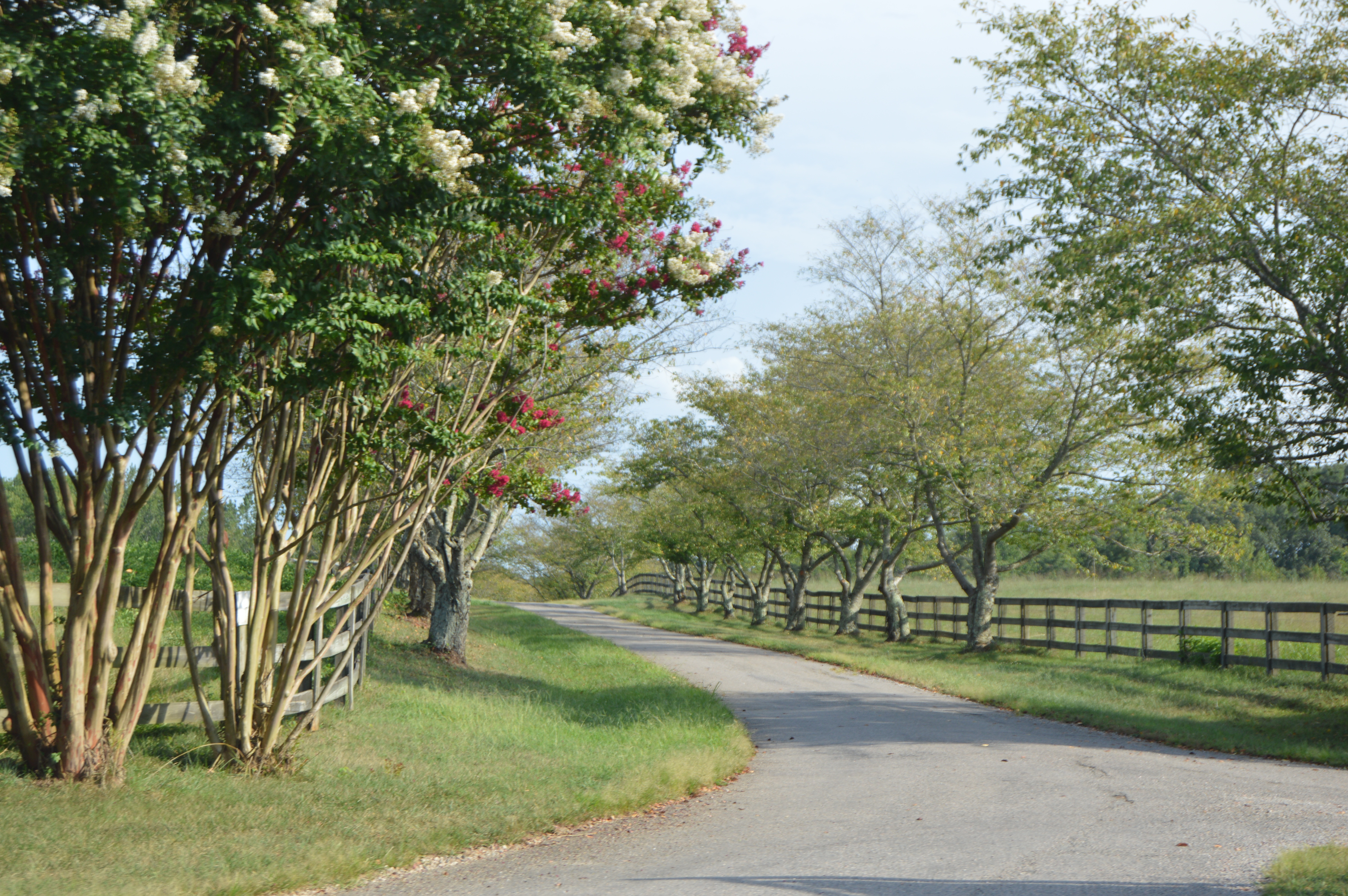
- Estate entrance

- Location within Virginia Location within the United States
- Location: W of Goochland off VA 600, near Goochland, Virginia
- Coordinates: 37°40′41″N 77°57′23″W
- Area: 900 acres (360 ha)
- NRHP reference No.: 72001397
- VLR No.: 037-0002

Significant dates
- Added to NRHP: December 27, 1972
- Designated VLR: April 6, 1971

Bolling Hall is a historic home located near Goochland, Goochland County, Virginia. The original section was built before 1799 as a two-story, frame structure measuring 34 feet by 22 feet. This was the main house of a property developed as a plantation. The house was expanded in 1803, and expanded again by 1815. It was extensively remodeled and expanded between 1845 and 1861.

The house was remodeled in 1947. The home has a two-story, five-bay central section with flanking wings.

It was listed on the National Register of Historic Places in 1972.
