= List of plantations in Virginia =

This is a list of plantations and/or plantation houses in the U.S. state of Virginia that are National Historic Landmarks, listed on the National Register of Historic Places, other historic registers, or are otherwise significant for their history, association with significant events or people, or their architecture and design.

Color key	Historic register listing
	National Memorial
	National Historic Landmark
	National Register of Historic Places
	Not listed

NRHP reference number	Name	Image	Date designated	Locality	County	Notes
66000040	Arlington House		October 15, 1966	Arlington; 38.88500°N 77.07333°W	Arlington	Home of Confederate General Robert E. Lee
78003012	Red Hill		February 14, 1978	Brookneal; 37.03222°N 78.89806°W	Campbell	Home of Revolutionary firebrand Patrick Henry
66000849	Bacon's Castle	Bacon's Castle	October 9, 1960	Bacon's Castle; 37.10944°N 76.72182°W	Surry	
69000243	Belle Grove Plantation		August 11, 1969	Middletown; 39.02078°N 78.30381°W	Frederick	
71001040	Berkeley		November 11, 1971	Charles City; 37.31710°N 77.18050°W	Charles City	
69000246	Berry Hill	HABS photograph	November 11, 1971	South Boston; 36.69673°N 78.94422°W	Halifax	
69000271	Brandon	Brandon	April 15, 1970	Burrowsville; 37.25754°N 76.99339°W	Prince George	
69000241	Bremo	HABS photograph	November 11, 1971	Bremo Bluff; 37.72542°N 78.32973°W	Fluvanna	
69000228	Camden	1980 HABS photograph	November 11, 1971	Port Royal; 38.16324°N 77.16135°W	Caroline	
69000249	Carter's Grove	Carter's Grove	April 15, 1970	Williamsburg; 37.20699°N 76.62500°W	James City	
9600054	Dodona Manor		June 19, 1996	Leesburg; 39.11353°N 77.55968°W	Loudoun	Home of Nobel Peace Prize laureate General George C. Marshall
69000252	Elsing Green		November 11, 1971	Tunstall; 37.60233°N 77.05120°W	King William	
66000829	Greenway Court	HABS photograph	October 9, 1960	White Post; 39.04436°N 78.11919°W	Clarke	
66000832	Gunston Hall		December 19, 1960	Lorton; 38.66404°N 77.16014°W	Fairfax	
69000325	Kenmore	Kenmore	April 15, 1970	Fredericksburg; 38.29315°N 77.46646°W	Independent city	
69000276	Menokin		November 11, 1971	Warsaw; 38.00867°N 76.80104°W	Richmond	Given to Francis Lightfoot Lee by John Tayloe II on the occasion of his wedding Rebecca Tayloe.
66000826	Monticello		December 19, 1960	Charlottesville; 38.01027°N 78.45231°W	Albemarle	Home of Thomas Jefferson
66000843	Montpelier		December 19, 1960	Orange; 38.21882°N 78.16848°W	Orange	Home of James Madison
66000845	Mount Airy		October 9, 1960	Warsaw; 37.97090°N 76.79111°W	Richmond	Seat of the Tayloe Family, built by John Tayloe II descended from William Tayloe
66000833	Mount Vernon		December 19, 1960	Alexandria; 38.70790°N 77.08610°W	Fairfax	Home of George Washington
66000842	Oak Hill	Oak Hill	December 19, 1960	Leesburg; 38.99746°N 77.62040°W	Loudoun	
69000255	Oatlands	Oatlands	November 11, 1971	Leesburg; 39.04094°N 77.61753°W	Loudoun	
69000223	Poplar Forest		November 11, 1971	Lynchburg; 37.34795°N 79.26449°W	Bedford	Secondary home of Thomas Jefferson
69000260	Prestwould	Prestwould	October 1, 1969	Clarksville; 36.64974°N 78.56425°W	Mecklenburg	
69000277	Sabine Hall	HABS photograph	April 15, 1970	Tappahannock; 37.94000°N 76.78495°W	Richmond	
70000788	Saratoga	Saratoga	November 7, 1973	Boyce; 39.08321°N 78.06022°W	Clarke	
66000835	Scotchtown	HABS photograph	December 21, 1965	Ashland; 37.84449°N 77.58619°W	Hanover	
69000328	Shirley		April 15, 1970	Hopewell; 37.34190°N 77.26099°W	Charles City	
71000991	Spence's Point	Spence's Point	November 11, 1971	Westmoreland; 38.08092°N 76.55038°W	Westmoreland	
66000922	Sherwood Forest		July 4, 1961	Charles City; 37.33369°N 77.01910°W	Charles City	
66000851	Stratford Hall		October 7, 1960	Lerty; 38.15193°N 76.83944°W	Westmoreland	
68000049	Tuckahoe	Tuckahoe Plantation	August 11, 1969	Manakin; 37.57004°N 77.65279°W	Goochland and Henrico	
66000846	Walnut Grove		July 19, 1964	Steele's Tavern; 37.93197°N 79.21368°W	Rockbridge	
66000923	Westover		October 9, 1960	Charles City; 37.31116°N 77.14950°W	Charles City	
70000792	Woodlawn		August 5, 1998	Alexandria; 38.71746°N 77.13739°W	Fairfax	
72001389	Ampthill			Cartersville	Cumberland	
95000245	The Anchorage			Kilmarnock	Northumberland	
69000015	Appomattox Manor			City Point	Prince George	
69000267	Barboursville			Barboursville	Orange	
05001274	Beauregard			Brandy Station	Culpeper	
85000984	Beaver Creek Plantation			Martinsville	Henry	
70000823	Bel Air	Bel Air	February 26, 1970	Bel Air; 38.6405106°N 77.3628558°W	Prince William	Home of Parson Weems
74002232	Belle Air			Charles City	Charles City	
80004198	Belmont		February 8, 1980	Belmont	Loudoun	
73002029	Belle Grove			Port Conway	King George	
73002031	Belle Isle			Lancaster	Lancaster	
73002337	Belvoir			Fort Belvoir	Fairfax	
82004573	Boldrup Plantation Archeological Site			Newport News	Independent city	
73002003	Carter Hall			Millwood	Clarke	
72001379	Castle Hill			Cismont	Albemarle	
80004195	Chericoke			Falls	King William	
03000208	Chester Plantation			Disputanta	Prince George	
73002211	Chesterville Plantation Site			Hampton	Independent City	
69000283	Chippokes Plantation			Surry	Surry	
70000805	Corotoman			Weems	Lancaster	
73002043	Criss Cross			New Kent	New Kent	
09001222	Curles Neck Plantation			Varina	Henrico	
70000873	Denbigh Plantation Site			Newport News	Independent city	
82004537	Edgehill			Shadwell	Albemarle	
06000706	Edgewood			Amherst	Amherst	
98000697	Edmondson Hall		June 11, 1998	Meadowview	Washington	
83003265	Edgewood Plantation and Harrison's Mill			Charles City	Charles City	
07000220	Elk Hill			Nellysford	Nelson	
08000391	Endview Plantation			Newport News	Independent city	
89000486	Evelynton			Charles City	Charles City	
72001417	Ferry Farm			Fredericksburg	Stafford	
04001545	Ferry Plantation House			Virginia Beach	Independent city	
75002030	Flowerdew Hundred Plantation			Garysville	Prince George	
78003026	Fox Hill Plantation			Lively	Lancaster	
82004579	Frascati			Somerset	Orange	
66000850	George Washington Birthplace National Monument			Colonial Beach	Westmoreland	
78000261	Green Spring			Williamsburg	James City	
74002121	Hickory Hill			Ashland	Hanover	
73001990	Highland			Charlottesville	Albemarle	
72001398	Howard's Neck Plantation			Pemberton	Goochland	
72001392	Huntley			Alexandria	Fairfax	
84000042	Jerdone Castle			Bumpass	Louisa	
72001401	Kingsmill			Williamsburg	James City	
07000799	Kippax Plantation			Hopewell	Prince George	Home of colonial planter and merchant Col. Robert Bolling
84003565	Leesylvania			Dumfries	Prince William	
69000232	Long Branch Plantation		October 1, 1969	Millwood	Clarke	
66000837	Marlbourne			Richmond	Hanover	
89001107	North Bend Plantation			Weyanoke	Charles City	
01000146	Otterburn			Bedford	Bedford	
85003052	Piney Grove at Southall's Plantation			Holdcroft	Charles City	
74002116	Point of Fork Plantation			Columbia, Virginia	Fluvanna	
83003293	Queen Hith Plantation Complex Site			Newport News	Independent city	
77001535	Richneck Plantation			Newport News	Independent city	
71000988	Rippon Lodge			Woodbridge	Prince William	
73002002	Roanoke Plantation			Saxe	Charlotte	
07000800	Roseville Plantation			Aylett	King William	
69000244	Rosewell			Gloucester Courthouse	Gloucester	
73002011	Salona			McLean	Fairfax	
69000341	Smith's Fort Plantation			Surry	Surry	
80004204	Soldier's Joy			Wingina	Nelson	
96000579	Soldier's Rest			Berryville	Clarke	
03000212	Stony Creek Plantation			DeWitt	Dinwiddie	
70000793	Sully			Chantilly	Fairfax	
75002040	Swann's Point Plantation Site			Scotland	Surry	
07000053	Temple Hall			Leesburg	Loudoun	
72001388	The Tuleyries			White Post	Clarke	
77001489	Varina Plantation			Varina	Henrico	
72001505	Weston Manor			Hopewell	Prince George	
74002104	Winton			Clifford	Amherst	
	Abingdon			Arlington	Arlington	
	Accokeek			Brooke	Stafford	
	Ampthill			Richmond	Independent city	
	Brookfield				Henrico	
	Ash Grove			Tysons Corner	Fairfax	
	Catalpa			Culpeper	Culpeper	
	Ceelys on the James			Newport News	Independent city	
	Chatham Manor			Fredericksburg	Independent city	
	Chatterton Plantation			King George	King George County	Home of John Tayloe IV, son of John Tayloe III
	Chestnut Grove			New Kent	New Kent	
	Chestnut Hill			Leesburg	Loudoun	
	Chopawamsic			Quantico	Prince William	
	Clarens			Alexandria	Independent city	
	Clover Forest Plantation			Goochland	Goochland	
	Clover Hill			Culpeper	Culpeper	
	Colross	Colross		Alexandria	Independent city	
	Epping Forest			Nuttsville	Lancaster	
	Four Mile Tree			Surry	Surry	
	Hollin Hall			Alexandria	Fairfax	
	Hopyard Plantation			Hopyard Landing; 38.251338°N 77.210618°W	King George	Tayloe Family Plantation, later Powhatan Hill Plantation owned by Edward Thornton Tayloe
	Hope Park			Fairfax	Fairfax	
	King's Creek			Cheatham Annex	York	
	Lexington			Mason Neck	Fairfax	
	Locust Hill			Leesburg	Loudoun	
	Martin's Hundred			Kingsmill	James City	
	Merchant's Hope			Hopewell	Prince George	
	Mount Brilliant			Farrington	Hanover	
	Mount Eagle			Alexandria	Fairfax	
	Oaken Brow Plantation			King George	King George County	Home of Charles Tayloe, son of John Tayloe III
	Okeley Manor			Alexandria	Fairfax	
	Ossian Hall			Annandale	Fairfax	
	Pampatike			Manquin	King William	
	Raspberry Plain			Leesburg	Loudoun	
	Ravensworth			Annandale	Fairfax	
	Selma			Leesburg	Loudoun	
	Shadwell			Shadwell	Albemarle	
	Sharswood			Gretna	Pittsylvania	Home of Charles Edwin Miller and Nathaniel Crenshaw Miller
	Smithfield			Fredericksburg	Spotsylvania	
	Stanley Hundred			Newport News, Virginia	Independent City	
	Strawberry Vale Manor			Tysons Corner	Fairfax	
	Towlston Grange			Great Falls	Fairfax	
	Vaucluse			Alexandria	Independent city	
	White House			White House	New Kent	
	Woodbridge			Woodbridge	Prince William	

HUTTON PLANTATION

Edmondson hall - Washington co.

== See also ==
- History of slavery in Virginia
- List of plantations in the United States
