= Pemberton, Virginia =

Unincorporated community in Virginia, United States

- Unincorporated community
- Location within Virginia Location within the United States
- Coordinates: 37°40′29″N 78°05′05″W
- Country: United States
- State: Virginia
- County: Goochland
- Elevation: 197 ft (60 m)
- Time zone: UTC-5 (Eastern (EST))
  - Summer (DST): UTC-4 (EDT)
- Area code: 804
- GNIS feature ID: 1493410

Pemberton is an unincorporated community in Goochland County, Virginia, United States. Virginia State Route 45 passes by Pemberton, located about 11 miles (18 km) west of Goochland, the county seat. It was named for the family that owned Clover Forest Plantation. Nearby is Howard's Neck Plantation, listed on the National Register of Historic Places.

== History ==
This hamlet was named for the owners of Clover Forest Plantation. The settlement overlooks the James River and was once a hub of rural trading activity. A dam and canal lock were built on the James at Pemberton to enable passage by boats. The lock lowered boats from the Kanawha Canal into the James River just below Cartersville in Cumberland County and connected with Tamworth and its mill. Trade moved from the Cartersville port and Willis River downriver on the James.

Pemberton became connected to other markets via the Cartersville-Fredericksburg State Road, that began in Cartersville, crossed the James, and continued northward. The Cartersville Bridge, built across the James River in 1824, connected Cartersville and Pemberton; it was the first James River bridge built in Goochland County. At the time, all other river crossings were by ferry.

In the late 1800s the Richmond and Alleghany Railroad (later the Chesapeake and Ohio Railway, and currently CSX) was built through the area along the tow path of the abandoned Kanawha Canal. Pemberton was one of the railroad stops. Trains arrived in the village daily, carrying passengers and mail.

By the early 1920s the rural village of Pemberton consisted of a large combined general store and post office, a lumber mill and pulp yards. Prominent Goochland County residents living in Pemberton included William Henry (Bill) Hall, a veteran of the Civil War; and Bland Selden Hobson, the only Goochland woman known to have served overseas in World War I.
