= Varina, Virginia =

Magisterial district in Virginia, United States

- Former unincorporated community and current magisterial district
- Location within Virginia
- Coordinates: 37°22′55″N 77°20′10″W
- Country: United States
- State: Virginia
- County: Henrico
- Named after: Varina plantation

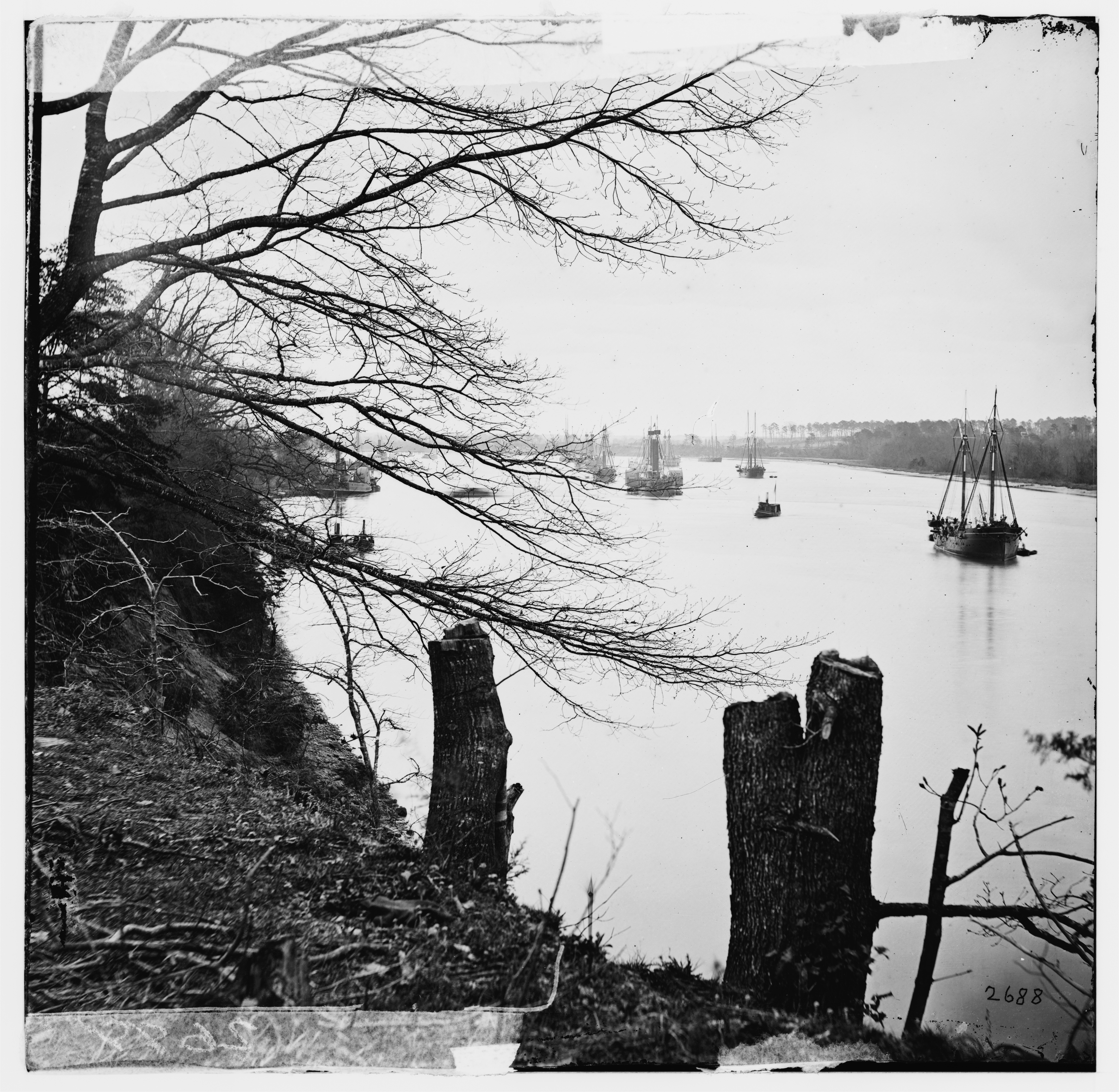
Varina Landing. View of ships on James River.

Varina (/vəˈraɪnə/ və-RY-nə) is a former unincorporated community and current magisterial district in the easternmost portion of Henrico County, Virginia, United States.

== History ==
=== Varina Plantation ===
The name "Varina" was likely sourced from the state of Barinas, Venezuela, which was known for its high quality tobacco (cura seca) in the 1600s.

The first occurrence of the name Varina was in 1632 which was ten years after the death of John Rolfe. A persistent but incorrect legend linking Varina Plantation with John Rolfe and Pocahontas arose in the mid-19th century.

=== County seat and town ===
The Native American massacre (Powhatan attack of 1622) resulted in the downfall of the Henricus settlement. The Varina settlement built up around much of Varina Plantation. Varina covered an area of 18 by 25 miles, but it later became known as Henrico. After that, Varina generally referred to the plantation. Varina became the county seat of Henrico when it was formed as one of the eight original shires of Virginia in 1634.

In 1666, the first courthouse was built at Varina for Henrico County. Varina was established as an unincorporated community in 1680.

By 1640, a church for Henrico Parish and other buildings were built either on the Varina plantation or in the settlement of Varina, but their location is unknown. By 1640, Varina was the site of the Henrico Parish glebe. From 1685 to 1694, Rev. James Blair was the minister at Varina Parish. He was made College of William & Mary's first rector in 1694 and was one of the founders of the school. After Blair, William Stith lived at the glebe at Varina.

In 1741, the Henrico Parish church was relocated to the present location of St. John's Episcopal Church in the Church Hill section of Richmond. Varina remained the county seat of Henrico County until 1752, when the seat was relocated to the growing city of Richmond, located at the head of navigation on the north side of the James River.

=== Varina historic districts ===
Varina historic districts include Cedar Hill and Armour House, Curles Neck, Dabbs House, Dorey Barn, Gravel Hill, and Osborne School House.

In November 1635, a land patent was attained by Captain Thomas Harris for 750 acres, of that 100 acres were awarded for being an early settler during the "time of Sir Thomas Dale". Harris represented Curles Neck at the House of Burgesses. His house was among the oldest in Virginia between 1635 and 1654, the ruins of which have been part of an archaeological study. The ruins were found near the existing house built in the early 18th century. It had tunnels to the James River to escape attacks by Native Americans. First called Longfield, (Note: The plantation had a number of names, starting with Longfield, and including Strawberry Plains, Bremo, and other names.) it is now commonly known as Curles Neck Plantation, the residence of Nathaniel Bacon, who led Bacon's Rebellion during the Colonial period and also was known for his campaigns against Native Americans. Bacon lived at the plantation from 1674 until his death in 1676. The property was confiscated by the British after Bacon was found guilty of treason. In 1698, the Randolph family of Virginia and held the property for longer than other owners. The Georgian style plantation is believed to have been destroyed during the Civil War.

Dabbs House was a residence of the Antebellum South which is located near the Eastern Government Center of Henrico and was the eastern headquarters of the Henrico's Division of Police. Chief Justice John Marshall owned the Chickahominy Farm near Meadowview Park as a country residence in the early 19th century.

The owner of Cedar Hill, James D. Vaughan, was a member of the 10th Regiment of the Virginia Cavalry during the Civil War and had served in the Virginia militia. The Greek Revival style farmhouse, built in the 19th century, still survives but has been part of a project to restore the building and it was moved from its original location.

=== Civil War ===
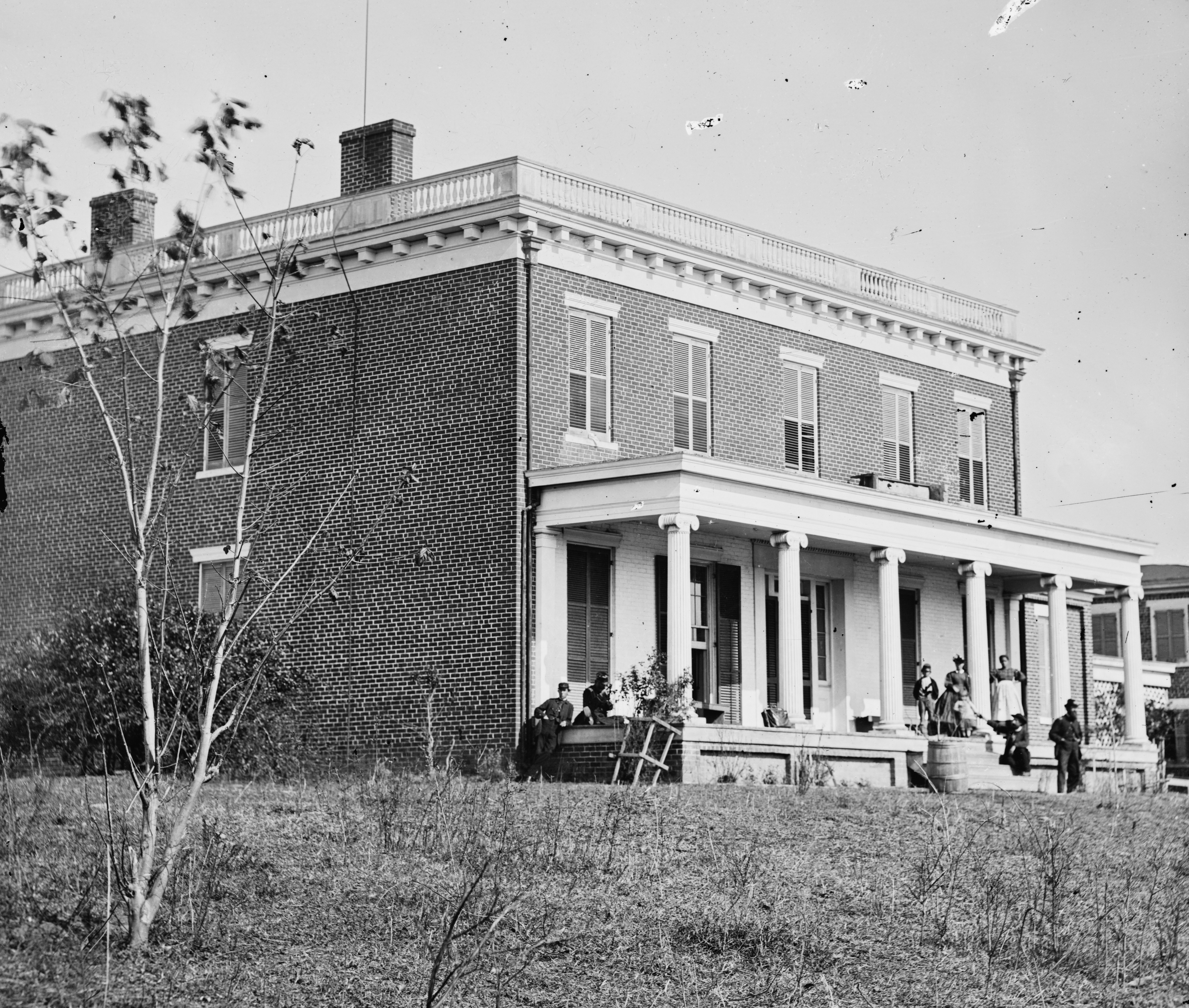
Aiken house at Varina, 1861–1869.

During the Civil War, Clover Forest Plantation was Robert E. Lee's headquarters for a period. The Seven Days Battle (1862) began in the Varina area and Lee was able to watch the battle from a bluff on what is now Meadowview Park. Cedar Hill was used as a camp during the Seven Days Battle, including by Confederate units of Dershaws Division.

During the Civil War (1861–1865), it was one of the two major Southern places for prisoner exchange. Union General Benjamin Butler took over the plantation for his official headquarters and the house and cabin housed his staff. Robert E. Lee, a Confederate soldier, established his Richmond-area headquarters at the Dabbs House.

=== Economy change ===
After the emergence of Richmond as a major community and port in the mid-18th century, and as land transportation became better, the location of Varina, which was not on any major roadway, became more isolated, gradually slipping into primarily farming use.

== Archaeology ==
Prehistoric Native American occupation has been identified in Meadowview Park by archaeologists.

== See also ==
- Former counties, cities, and towns of Virginia
