= Clover Forest =

Historic mansion in Virginia, United States

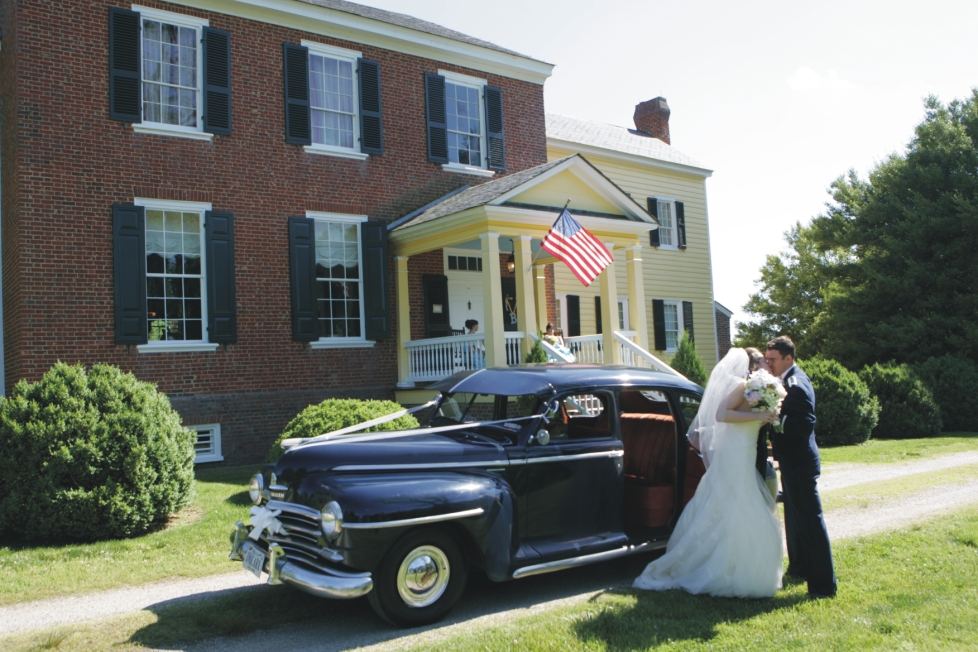
- Clover Forest, north porch

- Location within Virginia
- Alternative names: Clover Forest Mansion, Clover Forest Plantation

General information
- Architectural style: Federal
- Location: Goochland, Virginia, United States
- Coordinates: 37.667563°N 78.066344°W
- Construction started: 1761

Design and construction
- Architect: Captain Thomas Pemberton

Renovating team
- Architect: J. A. Volcker van Soelen
- Renovating firm: Harold Keaton

Website
- Official website
Designations

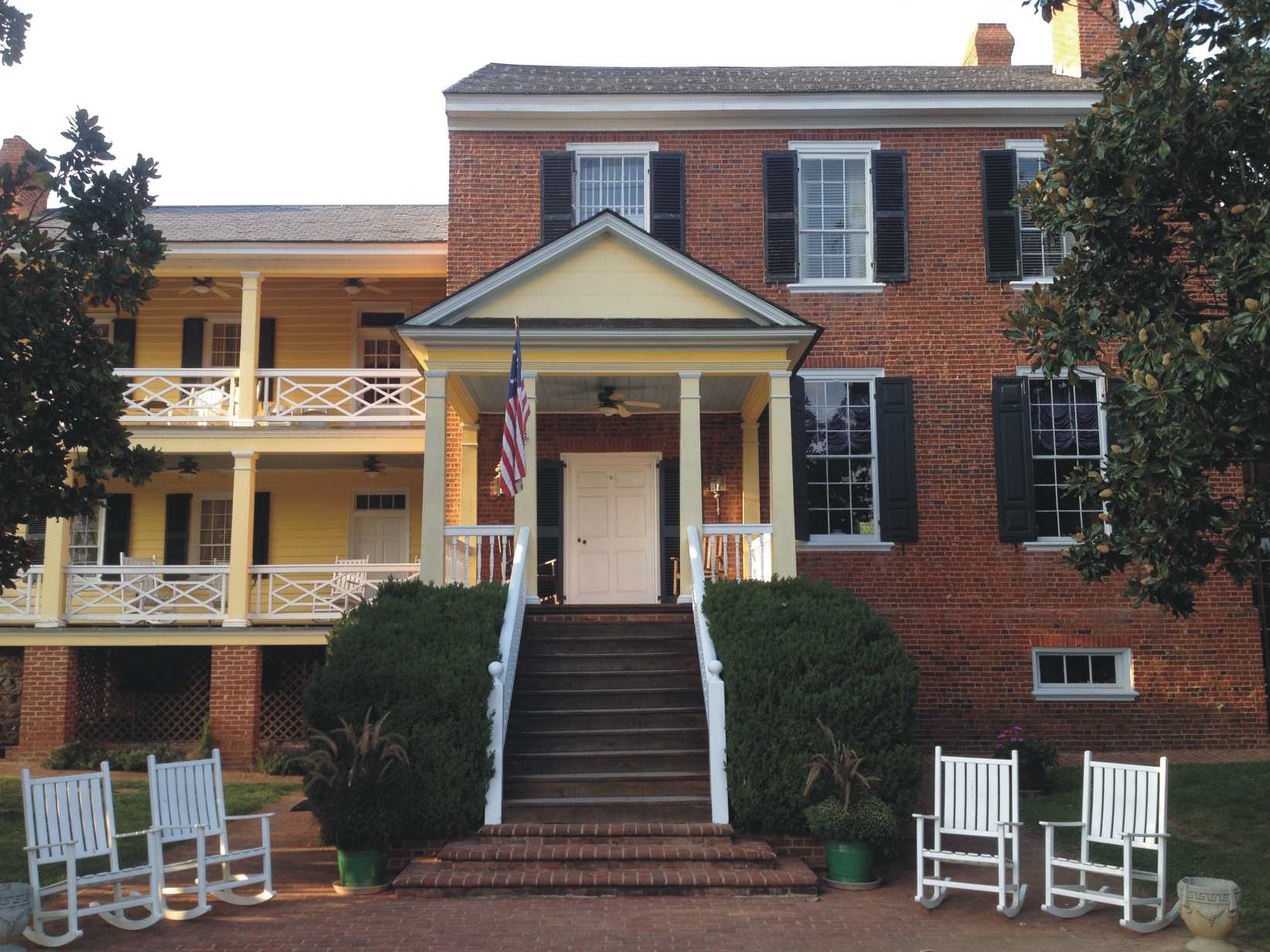
Clover Forest, southern exposure.

Clover Forest is a historic mansion and former plantation house built starting in 1761 and located in Goochland, Virginia. The mansion lies in a large bend of the James River, and is an authentically restored in a Federal-style with portions of the architecture dating to Pre–American Revolutionary Period.

The location of the property is part of what has been called the "Golden Horseshoe", with former plantation houses creating a horseshoe-shape from east to west, including Blythewood, Orapax, Bolling Hall, Pocahontas, Dungeness 1931, Rock Castle, Deer Lodge, Mannsville, Bolling Island, Snowden, Clover Forest, Howard's Neck, Harrison's Elk Hill, and Jefferson's Elk Hill.

Since 2003, Clover Forest operates as a private event venue.

== Pre–history (1714–1761) ==
In 1714, the land on which Clover Forest stands was initially included within 2,000 acres (810 ha) patented by Charles Fleming, extending along the upper James River from what were developed as Rock Castle to Elk Island farms. Bolling Island was also developed along the river. This territory was eventually divided and developed as the neighboring estates of Rock Castle, Snowden, and Howard’s Neck, and the site of Elk Island. Because of the later colonial and antebellum history of this area, as well as several extant properties, it has been proposed for designation as Fleming's Part Rural Historic District in a 2003 architectural survey prepared for the state's Department of Historic Resources.

Fleming was unable to develop it rapidly enough, and portions "fell back" to the Crown of England. In 1739/1740 Lieutenant Governor William Gooch authorized the sale of 2,590 acres (1,050 ha) for £13 to John Woodson, Gentleman. Woodson split the purchase with Joseph Dabbs, but Woodson and Dabbs failed "to make such cultivation and improvements" to the land as required, and the land reverted again to the Crown.

In 1745, the land was sold again, for £13 to Philip Webber. Webber could not fulfill his obligations for development and again the land reverted. It was resold, this time for £11 15/-, to Arthur Hopkins in 1753. Hopkins apparently accomplished more with the land; under his ownership only a portion reverted to the Crown.

== William Douglas (1761–1763) ==
On 7 August 1761, the Reverend William Douglas and his wife (née Nicholas) successfully patented 1,134 acres (459 ha) for £4 10/-. Their purchase of the property in 1761 has been considered the start of development of Clover Forest. Douglas and his wife may have occupied the house at Clover Forest as their residence, or used the farm to provide produce. They are credited with building what is today the oldest section of the house (the lower part of the west wing). Twenty months later when they sold the land, houses and orchards were conveyed with it.

Douglas is noted, at least locally, as author of the Douglas Register, an important resource for historians and genealogists. He was minister of the vast St. James Northam Parrish of the Church of England, the established church in the colony. It encompassed today's Virginia counties of Goochland, Fluvanna, Louisa, Orange, and Spotsylvania. The original Dover Church in Goochland, no longer standing, was his home church.

As the only legally authorized clergyman of the established church, Douglas compiled (nearly) all births, marriages, and deaths during the period from about 1750 to 1797. He also recreated some miscellaneous records dating to 1705, as no register was maintained before he was called to the parish.

== Bowler Cocke the younger of Henrico County (1763–1792) ==
On 19 April 1763, Bowler Cocke the younger of Henrico County became the new owner. He kept the property for almost thirty years. He did not appear to live in Goochland but operated the farm for profit. At the close of the American Revolutionary War, Cocke refined his holding, selling a portion here and buying land there, resulting in a continuous holding of 898 acres (363 ha). Cocke was an active land speculator, owning many different tracts of land both within and outside Goochland County. Like other speculators, Cocke bought some of the lands in Kentucky and Ohio that had been granted in lieu of pay to Revolutionary war veterans. He may have encountered Captain Thomas Pemberton through such transactions.

== Captain Thomas Pemberton: (1792–1828) ==
Thomas Pemberton's origins are not known. Some evidence points to Buckingham County, but its courthouse burned twice, making research there very difficult. Some evidence points to King William County.

=== Officer, Continental Dragoon and Legionnaire ===
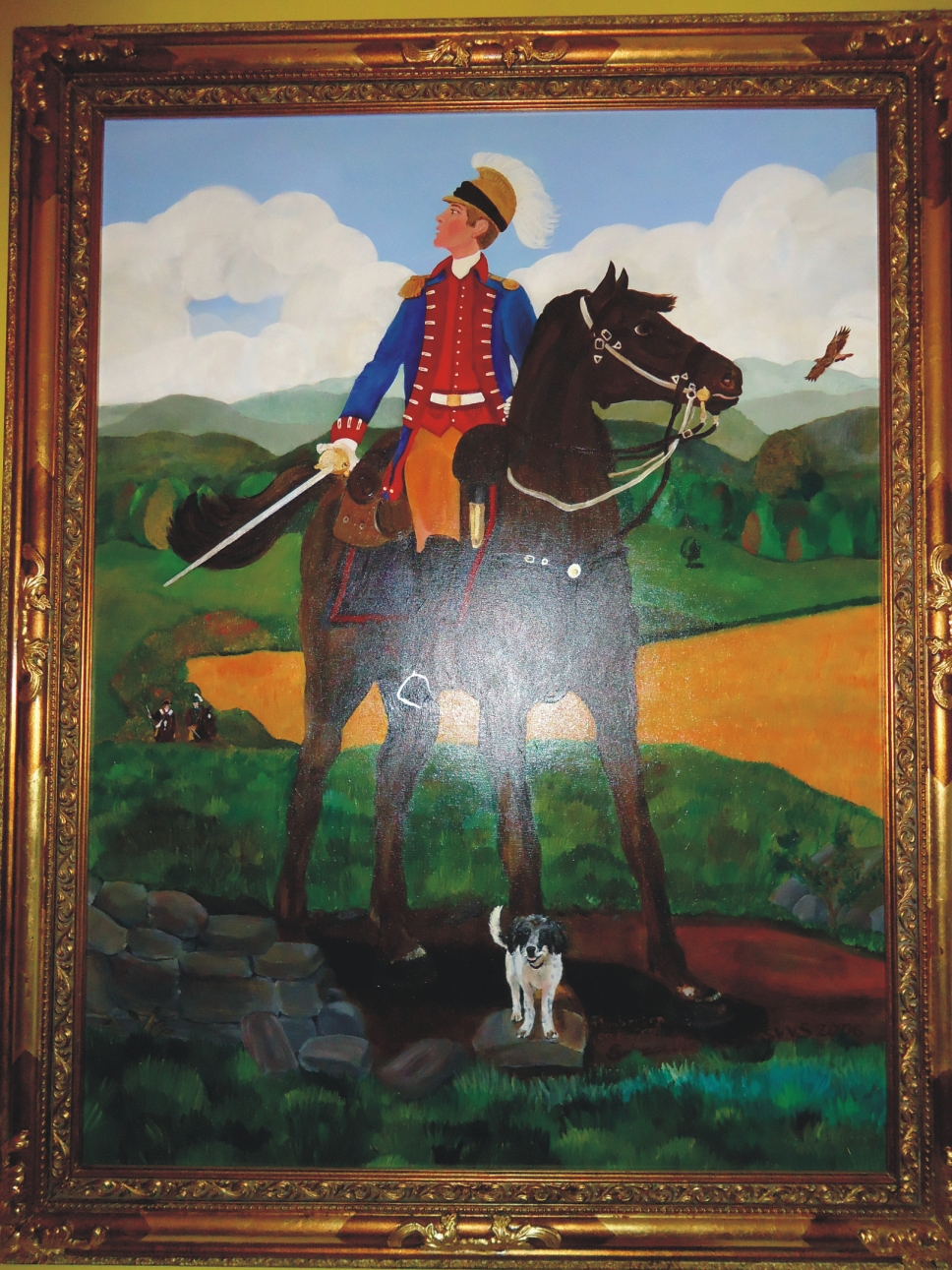
Pemberton on Patrol by Sebastian Volcker, 2005, acrylic on canvas. Rendering of Captain Thomas Pemberton in the 1781 uniform he might have worn.

Pemberton was known to be commissioned as cornet in Bland's Virginia Horse, later the 1st Continental Light Dragoons, on 5 December 1776. (A cornet is the officer bearing the flag or regimental colors). Thirteen days later he was promoted to second lieutenant, and the regiment soon headed north to join General George Washington at Valley Forge. As the Continental Army had little cavalry, the Dragoons were called on for scouting, foraging, and warfare.

Pemberton made first lieutenant in 1778. He was promoted to captain in the 1st Regiment of Continental Light Dragoons on 12 June 1779, after the Regiment's transfer the previous year from the Main Continental Army to the Southern Department. All four regiments evolved from light dragoons units to legions that combined mounted and foot units. The 1st, 3rd and 4th eventually merged and fought together in one unit of four troops under the command of Colonel William Washington (cousin of the General), and officially named the 1st Legionary Corps on 1 January 1781. The First, as Dragoon and Legion, fought in Northern New Jersey, protected Philadelphia, survived the siege of Charleston 1780, fought with Lafayette in Virginia and at Yorktown, and defended the Carolinas in Nathaniel Greene's Campaign.

Pemberton retired from military service on 9 November 1782 or January 1783. For his six years of military service, Pemberton was awarded 4,000 acres (1,600 ha) in Kentucky on the waters of the North Forke. He was one of the original members of the Society of the Cincinnati in the State of Virginia.

=== B. Pembertons of Goochland ===
In 1792 (exact records have not survived) Captain Thomas Pemberton and his wife Dice acquired the property that they named Clover Forest. In 1795 they sold the 4,000 acres (1,600 ha) of Kentucky bounty lands which Pemberton had been awarded for his service in the Continental Army to Bowler Cocke. In 1807 Pemberton had the main part of the house constructed. Over an English basement were built the parlor, the master bedchamber (today the dining room), two large rooms and an annex, and a large attic room under the rafters. On one of the chimneys is a brick dated 1811, marking the completion of the construction. All the wood work in the parlor, the hall and staircase e, and most of the dining room, dates to this period. Of particular interest are the mantles in the dining room and parlor. On one the seal of the United States commemorates Pemberton's service The eagle's head is turned to the olive branch. On the other, agricultural implements symbolize Pemberton's return to agricultural pursuits.

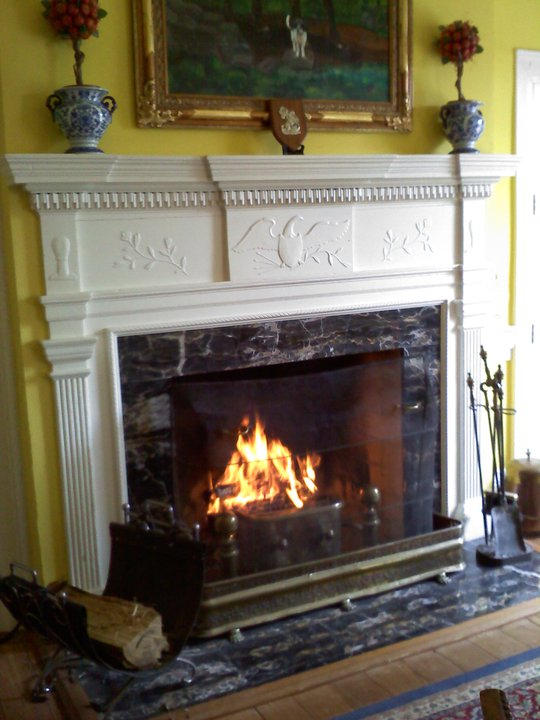
The seal of the United States on the surround of the dining room fireplace commemorates Captain Pemberton's service.

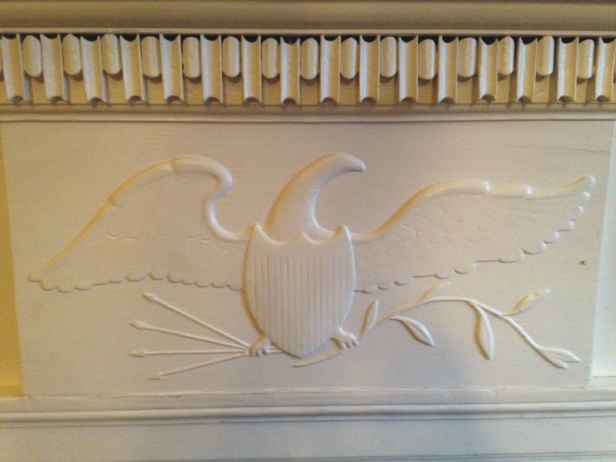
Detail of the Clover Forest mantel showing the Eagle of the United States, commemorating Pemberton's service in the Continental Army.

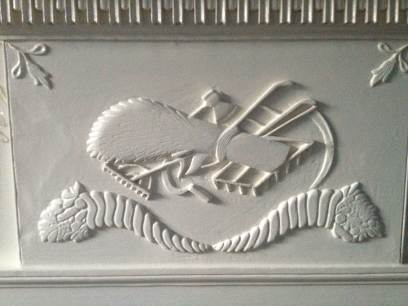
Detail of the Clover Forest mantel showing the agricultural implements symbolizing Captain Thomas Pemberton's return to agrarian life.

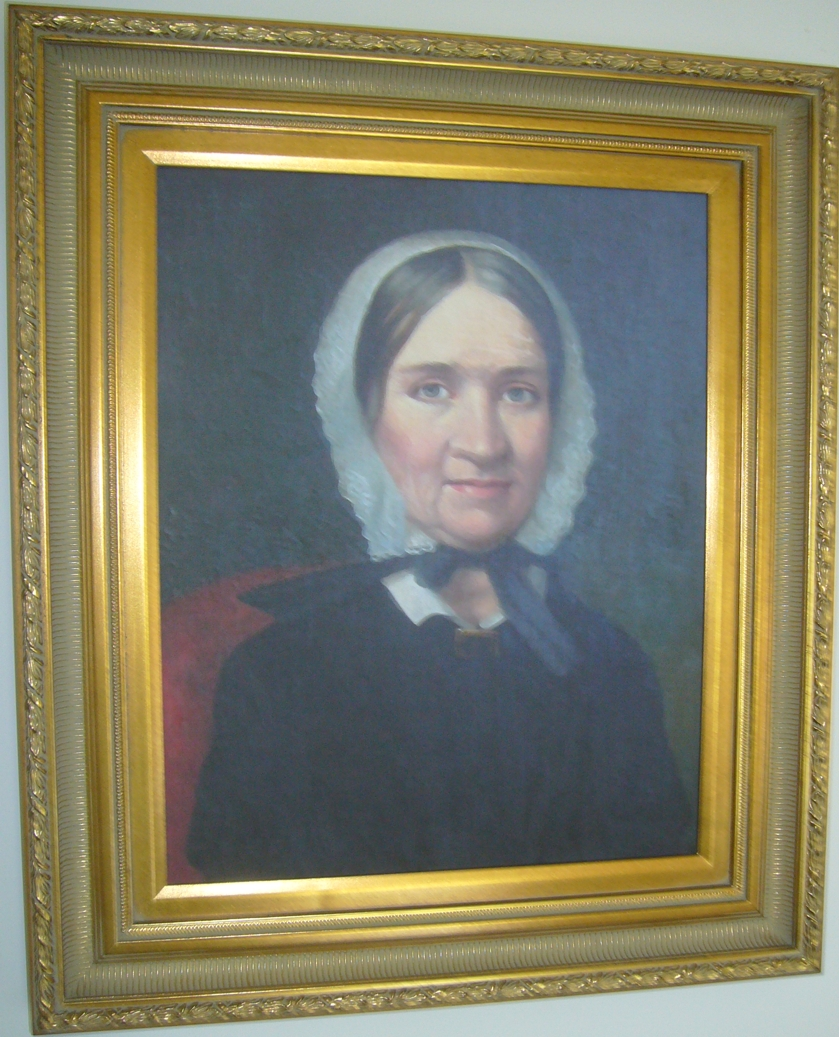
Anne Coleman Pemberton Crenshaw, said to be copy of a painting by Thomas Sully. Picture courtesy of Dave and Nancy Brown.

Three generations of Pembertons would live at Clover Forest, longer than any other family. Captain Thomas Pemberton and his wife Dice had six children who lived to adulthood, four daughters and two sons: Ann Coleman (married Ashburry Crenshaw, April 1810); Dice King (married Isaac Quarles, Jr., 4 August 1814); Mary B. (married Archibald Bryce, on 16 January 1811); and Maria A. (married John A. Selden of Westover Plantation, on 24 August 1823); John B. (married Mary Louisa Gilliam, daughter of John Gilliam, on 7 February 1829); and Robert (married Lucy Jane Scott, daughter of Thomas Scott, on 1 May 1828.).

Captain Pemberton served as a church warden for the Lickinghole Episcopal Church, on Lickinghole Creek where he helped straighten out the property deed of the Church. He represented the Cartersville Bridge Company in trying to mediate the conflict between the first Cartersville Bridge (chartered 1818, finished 1821) and Randolph Harrison's competing ferry. Harrison offered crossings at a lower toll rate. The mediation was not successful, and the conflict reached the Virginia Supreme Court, long after Pemberton's passing.

Pemberton died on 4 October 1828, a few months after having obtained a pension for his military service. As Dice Pemberton is not mentioned in her husband’s will, she likely died before her husband. They are both thought to be buried in the Pemberton family cemetery on the grounds of Clover Forest. Their graves did not have headstones but were visible at one time.

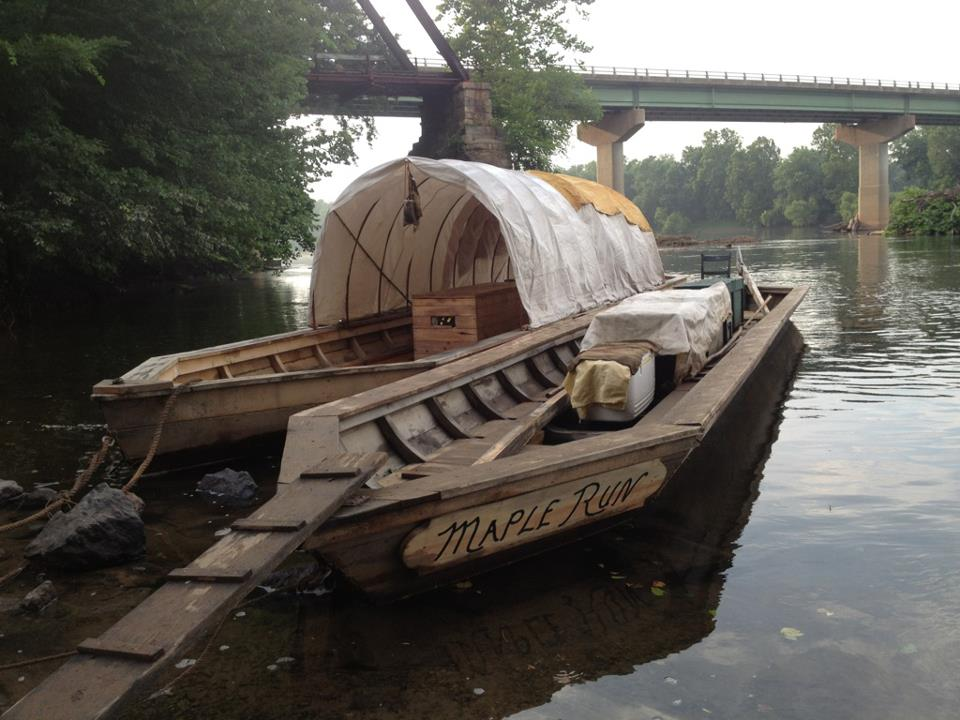
Batteaux at Cartersville landing opposite Pemberton with the third and fourth Cartersville Bridge in the background.

=== Village of Pemberton ===
The village of Pemberton was named for the Pemberton family of Clover Forest. Now barely a hamlet overlooking the James River, it was once a hub of activity. Through the years, it was connected to trade by canal and river, and later railroad.

== John B. and Mary Louisa Gilliam Pemberton: (1828–1873) ==
John B. Pemberton (b. 13 May 1803-d. Clover Forest 9 Dec 1848), eldest son of Captain Thomas Pemberton, married Mary Louisa Gilliam on 7 February 1829. His father died later that year. The couple had five known children, four of whom lived to adulthood: Polly, Thomas, Virginia, and Richard.

Mary Louisa Gilliam Pemberton was the last of the Pembertons to live at Clover Forest. Born 6 Dec. 1803, she died in September 1873 at age 69. The Pembertons had occupied the property for 81 years. She is buried in the Pemberton family cemetery on the grounds of Clover Forest, near her son John (b. 5 March 1835 – d. Christmas Day 1839) and her husband.

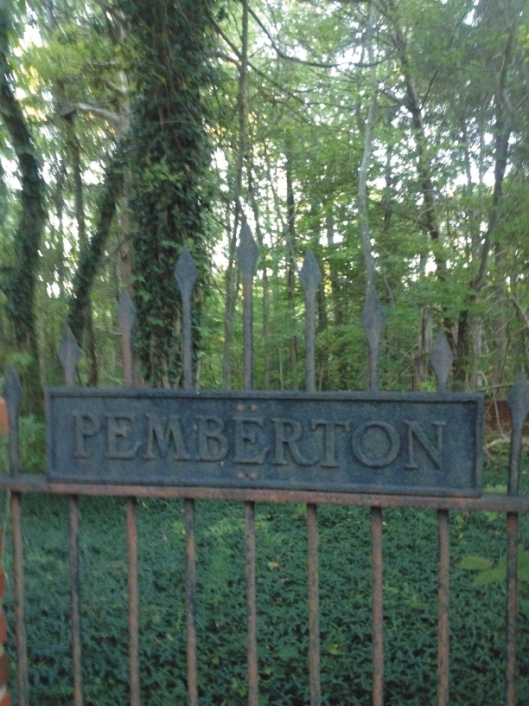
Pemberton Cemetery Gate

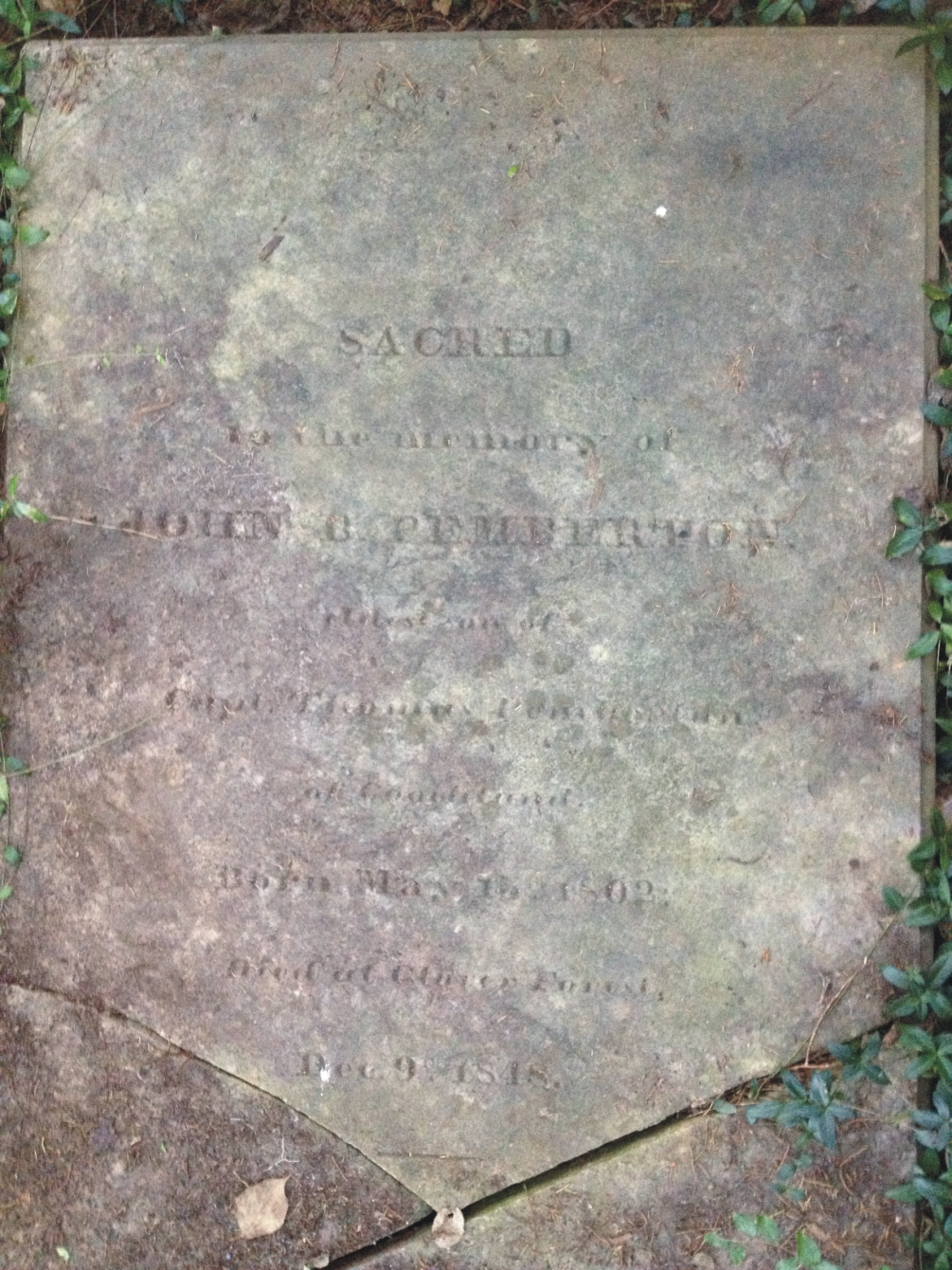
Sacred, to the memory of, John B. Pemberton, eldest son of, Capt. Thomas Pemberton, of Goochland, Born May 13, 1803, Died at Clover Forest, Dec. 9th 1848.

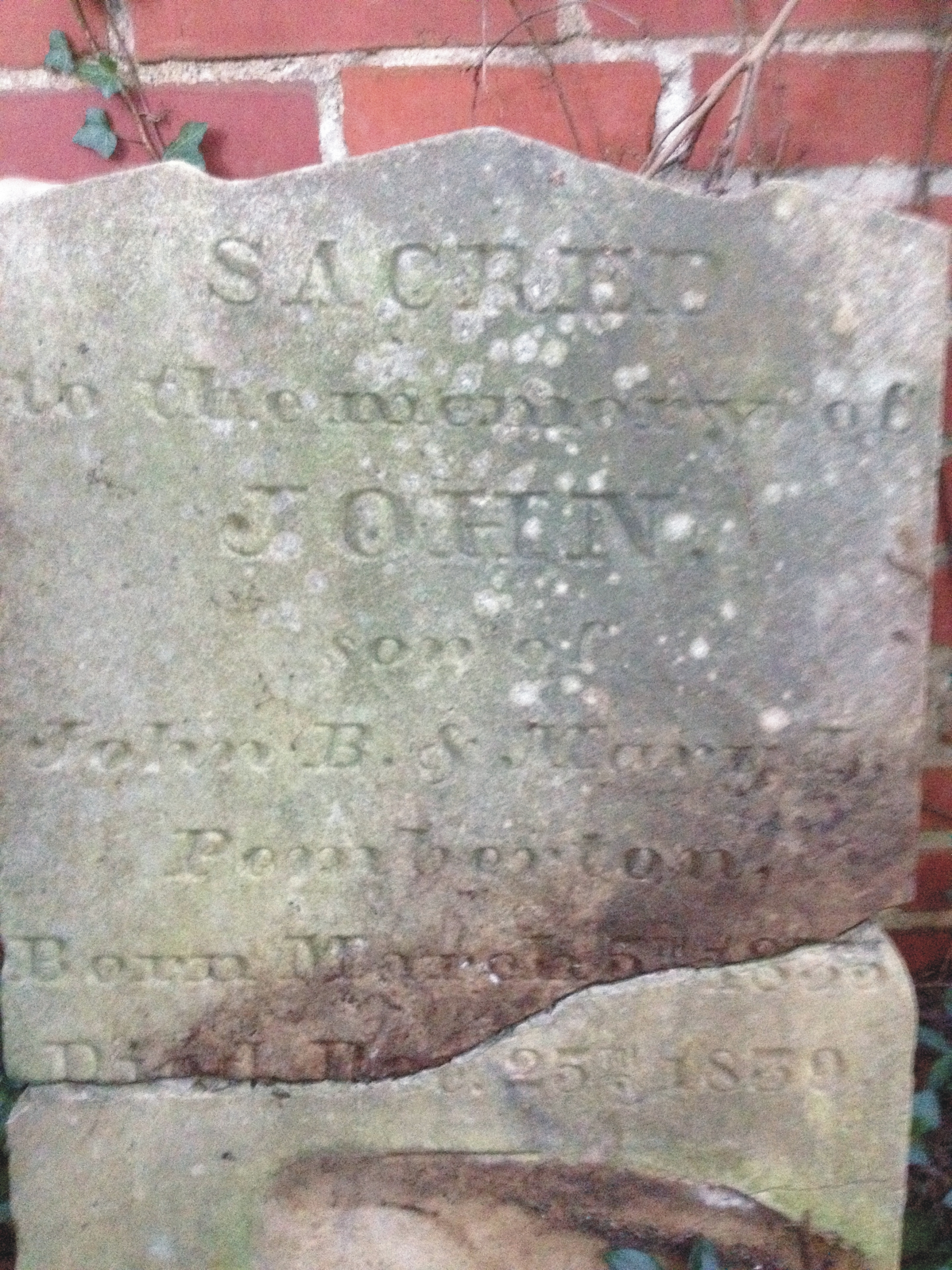
John 4 years old died Christmas Day: Sacred to the memory of, John, son of, John B. and Mary L., Pemberton, Born March 5, 1835, Died Dec., 25 1839.

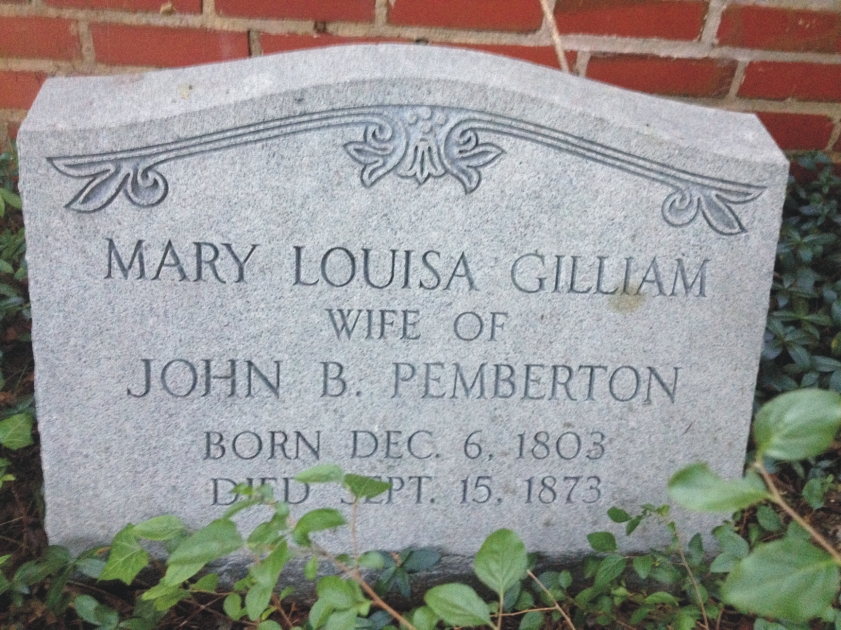
Mary Louisa Gilliam, Wife of, John B. Pemberton, Born Dec. 6, 1803, Died Sept. 15, 1873.

== Parrish through Witcamp (1884–1949) ==
Due to debt, creditors of the Pembertons won a Chancery suit in 1870. John Colton bought Clover Forest that year, but apparently allowed Mary Louise Gilliam Pemberton to live at the property until her death a few years later. Colton defaulted on his payments, and in 1879 a decree for resale was imposed.

In 1881 William H. Parrish bought Clover Forest, then comprising more than 900 acres (360 ha) that then comprised Clover Forest, and it was legally conveyed to him in 1884. In 1882, Parrish bought an additional 790.5 acres (319.9 ha) of Howard's Neck, which bordered on Clover Forest, to enlarge his holding.

Two brothers Boggs, hailing from West Virginia with family money from coal and oil, bought the adjoining properties of Clover Forest and Snowden. There were intermarriages with the Pearcys and Witcamps.

== Richard S. and Margarite Louise Holson (1949–1967) ==
Richard S. and Louise Holson, as she was known, were a couple from Chicago who purchased Clover Forest to use both as a vacation home and as a working farm; it was run as a business, Independence Operations, Inc. In 1962 they acquired the low grounds of Bolling Island to add to their property.

The Holsons brought many furnishings from Chicago, such as the kitchen cabinets and an old gas crystal chandelier that still hangs in the dining room. Farm manager, Bud Engel, also from Illinois, was entrusted with both the large modern cattle and hog operation and physical upgrades to Clover Forest. Most of the outbuildings and former slave quarters were likely removed in this period. A three-car carriage house replaced the outhouse. The east side porch and root cellar were removed, and the library wing was added to the house. The bedrooms were equipped with bathrooms.

The existing terraces were augmented. A dam was built across the creek, forming a 7-acre lake. The dam had to be made higher than originally intended as an additional spring was uncovered near the dam site. A three-hole golf course and Mrs. Holson's rose garden were laid out and tended by three full-time gardeners. Pickett Pannel (sp?) was the head gardener. He also served as the undertaker for the black community. Buddy Cave was chiefly in charge of the maintenance of golf course.

When the Holsons sold their property, Bud Engel remained in Virginia. He had a farm of his own in King William County, which he worked with his son Kevin. Kevin Engel has also stayed in farming, adapting modern technology. He founded Engel Family Farms in 1991. In 2009 his business had 23 employees who worked 14,000 acres (5,700 ha) in many areas of Virginia; all but 500 acres (200 ha) are now owned by other people. He has specialized in grains: corn, wheat and barley, and soybeans. Engel rents land from a total of 86 owners. Some of their land was once part of Independence Operations, Inc. at Clover Forest.

== Floyd Dewey Gottwald Sr. (1967–197?) ==
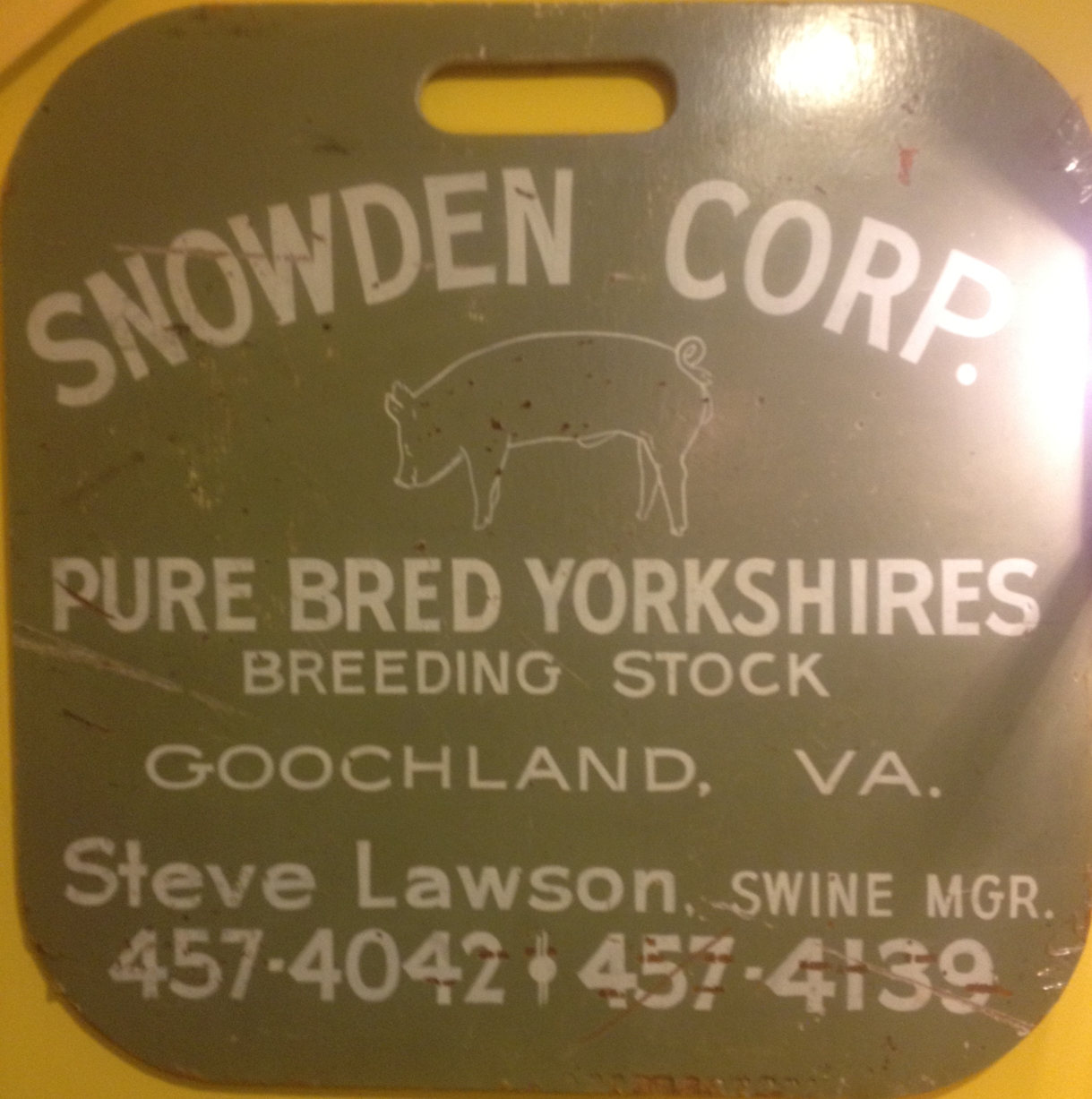
Swine or pig board used to handle hogs at fairs and display the owner's name.

Floyd Dewey Gottwald Sr. was the Chairman of Ethyl Corporation of Richmond when he bought Clover Forest and the nearby properties of Snowden from Fred and Virginia Fleischman. He traded Contention farm, located further east in Goochland County, for Snowden. The consolidated properties operated under the business name of Snowden Corporation.

He hired Robert Lee Johnson (13 February 1920– August 1979) as the Farm Manager and Steve Lawson Sr. as the Swine Manager. Before working for Snowden Corporation, Johnson had been farm manager for the Snead Dairy Farm (it is known today as Willow Oaks); he had been in farming since childhood.

Gottwald was enthusiastic about learning the history of the properties. When William E. Trout III told him about the "Cartersville Connection", the short canal and lock that connected the Kanawha Canal to the James River and the Cartersville port, Gottwald had the Connection excavated. It was found to be in nearly perfect condition.

Gottwald created a 67-acre lake off Whittcamp Road by damming Pickett's Creek, also known as Fleming's Park Creek. There had been a mill on the creek at one time. Joe Scales was hired to conduct engineering of the dam; it was the largest private lake project in Goochland.

The Gottwalds sold the properties under the Snowden Corporation in the 1970s. A land speculator bought them and worked to divide and develop the properties.

== Bibliography ==
- Bullard, CeCe (1994). Goochland Yesterday and Today. Goochland County Historical Society.
- Farrar, Emmie Fergusson; Hines, Emilee (1974). Old Virginia Houses, The Heart of Virginia. Hale Publishing.
- Hudgins, Dennis (1996). "Goochland County Plat Number Index to the Surveys in the Virginia Land Office Patent and Grant Books". Goochland County Historical Society Magazine. XXVIII.
- Loescher, Burt Garfield (March 1954). Bland's Virginia Horse: The Story of the First Continental Light Dragoons. Journal of the Company of Military Collectors & Historians, Vol. VI, No. 1.
- Miner, Robert G. (1977). Survey of Early American Design. Arno Press Inc.
- Trout, III, William E. (1994). The Slate and Willis's Rivers Atlas. The Virginia Canals & Navigations Society, Incorporated.
- Weeks, Elie (1973). "Clover Forest". Goochland County Historical Society Magazine. B-1.
- Wright Jr, Robert K. (1983). The Continental Army. Center of Military History, United States Army.
