= Elk Island (Goochland County, Virginia) =

Island in the James River in Goochland County, Virginia

- Location within Virginia

Geography
- Location: James River
- Coordinates: 37°42′59.52″N 78°5′44″W
- Highest elevation: 57 m (187 ft)

Administration
- United States
- County: Goochland County, Virginia

Elk Island, located in Goochland County, Virginia near Cartersville, is an island on the James River and across from the former Elk Hill plantation at the mouth of Byrd Creek. The island, one mile by five miles, is accessed by Elk Island Road (Virginia State Route 603). (Note: The bridge to the island was destroyed during the Civil War by the 1st New Jersey Volunteer Cavalry, led by Myron H. Beaumont.)

Annual flooding, and particularly a flood of 1870 that covered the entire island, laid bare evidence of Native American occupations. Three skeletons were found to have been buried at the southern end of the island. Other bones were found when plowing the land a little deeper than normal. (Note: The island may have been the site of a Monacan village.) Two archaeological sites on the island, the Wright and Little River sites, provided evidence of Late Archaic and Early Woodland period settlement through the presence of ceramic shards, including decorated Potomac Creek pottery, and other artifacts. There is also evidence that people inhabited the land during the 17th century. The artifacts included Delftware pottery, gun flints, and bottle glass.

Elk Island was originally patented to John Woodson and Charles Fleming on 16 June 1714. It was subsequently purchased by John Thornton. On 6 April 1723, James Skelton, contractor for the Second Capitol at Williamsburg, purchased it from Thornton. Elk Island was part of the John Wayles and Thomas Jefferson Elk Hill plantation holdings. Tobacco and corn were grown on the island. Jefferson attained the Elk Hill and Elk Island plantation through his wife, Martha Wayles Jefferson. Jefferson's son-in-law, Bathurst Skelton (Bathurst was NOT Jefferson's son in law. He was Martha Wayles's first husband. Upon his death, Martha then married Thomas Jefferson) also owned 1,000 acres on Elk Island. Bathurst Skelton was Martha Wayles' first husband. Both Skelton and later Thomas Jefferson used slaves to work the land. There were about 1,200 acres of fertile land on the island in 1894.

In 1836, the James River and Kanawha Company evaluated the creation of a canal, an arm of which would end at the lower end of Elk Island, within the James River for transportation. The Elk Hill plantation conveyed their products to Richmond via canal boats.

During the Revolutionary War, Elk Island and Elkhill were occupied by Lord Cornwallis and his men for ten days, during which time they destroyed many of the crops on the plantation and slaughtered livestock for provisions. Jefferson visited the site not long after Cornwallis left, and later recorded what he had seen in a letter to William Gordon in Paris.

It is now the location of the Elk Hill Winery.
