= Curles Neck Plantation =

Historic house in Virginia, United States

- Curles Neck Farm
- U.S. National Register of Historic Places
- Virginia Landmarks Register
- Aerial view from 1951

- Location within Virginia Location within the United States
- Location: 4705 Curles Neck Rd., Henrico, Virginia
- Coordinates: 37.387258°N 77.296241°W
- Area: 156 acres (63 ha)
- NRHP reference No.: 09001222
- VLR No.: 043-0035

Significant dates
- Added to NRHP: December 22, 2009
- Designated VLR: December 17, 2009

Curles Neck Plantation (also known as Curles Neck Farm) is located between State Route 5 and the north bank of the James River in the Varina district of Henrico County, Virginia. One of the great James River Plantations, Curles Neck has remained in active use for almost 400 years and remains a privately owned working farm which is not currently open to the public.

As "Curles Neck Farm", a 5600-acre property was listed on the U.S. National Register of Historic Places in 2009.

== History ==
In November 1635, a year after the formal designation of Henrico County as one of 8 shires (or counties) in the Virginia Colony, a land patent for 750 acres (3.0 km^{2}) was granted to Captain Thomas Harris, who had apparently served under Sir Thomas Dale. The tobacco farm was referred to by early settlers as "Longfield", but soon thereafter became known as Curles Neck. Captain Harris served in the House of Burgesses at Jamestown as a Burgess for Curles Neck.

The source of the name Curles Neck is unknown. Many people thought that the name derived from the meandering sweeping curves of the tidal James River in the area, which can clearly be seen by map. However, the family name of Curle is recorded in various grants over a span of one hundred years in the books at the State Land Registry Office. A prominent representative of that family was the patriot Wilson Roscow Curle of the Revolutionary era.

=== Seat of Nathaniel Bacon ===
In the early 1670s, the property was owned by Nathaniel Bacon. The colonists in outlying locations such as those in Henrico and the Northern Neck came into conflict with the Colony's Royal Governor, Sir William Berkeley over taking reprisal action for alleged thefts by the Native Americans. In 1676, the tension erupted into a conflict between the colonists known as Bacon's Rebellion. Governor Berkeley was forced to retreat from Jamestown to the join loyalists on the Eastern Shore. Bacon fell ill and died in Gloucester, and the rebellion fell apart. In the aftermath, two dozen colonists were tried and hanged by Governor Berkeley. After Nathaniel Bacon was found guilty of treason post-mortem, his property was confiscated by the Crown, and later resold to William Randolph.

=== Revolutionary and Civil War periods ===
During the mid-18th century, John Pleasants donated the first Quaker meeting house at Curles Neck and was one of the trustees appointed to represent the newly formed Town of Richmond. In 1771, his slaves were granted their freedom under the terms of his will. In 1852 Charles Senff, a New York sugar merchant, purchased the then 3,250 acre Curles tract from William Allen. He also purchased two adjoining farms increasing his holdings to over 5,000 acres. Seniff built the 15-room brick Georgian Revival mansion that exists today to replace the antebellum house which had fallen into disrepair during the Civil War.

=== 20th century ===
Industrialist C. K. G. Billings bought the property in 1913 and built it into one of the most important horse breeding farms in the country.

The next owner, A. B. Ruddock, started Curles Neck Dairy, which began retail operations in 1933. By the mid 20th century Curles Neck Farm under the ownership of Fred Watkins who purchased the property in 1943 had become one of the largest dairy suppliers in the eastern United States. The company's plant in the Scott's Addition section of Richmond held processing and distribution facilities, and a small retail store. The operation lasted until 1980, and generations of school children toured the large dairy barns.

== Eastern Airlines crash landing ==
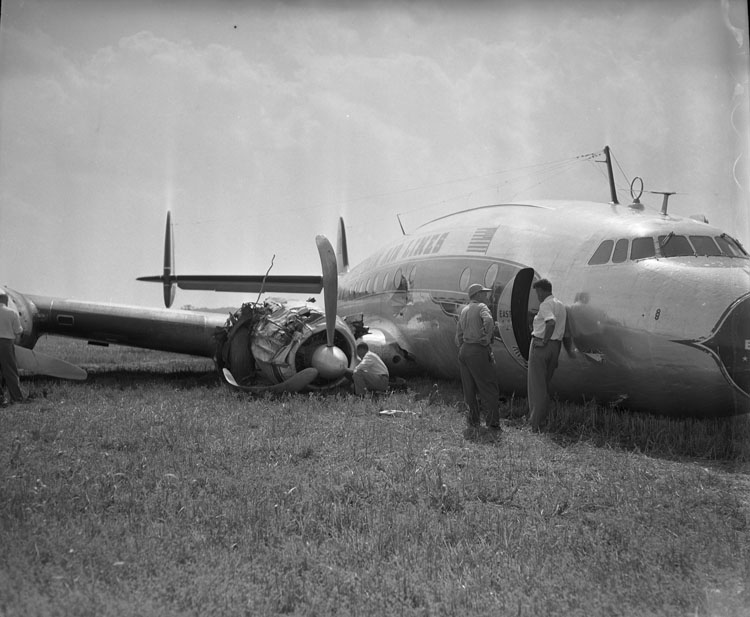
Eastern Air Lines Flight 601 crash landing, Curles Neck Farm, 1951

On Thursday 19 July 1951 Eastern Airlines Flight 601 departed Newark International Airport bound for Miami International Airport at 14:15. As it passed Philadelphia, at 14:52, the Lockheed Constellation reached cruising altitude of 18000 feet. For the next 25 to 30 minutes violent turbulence accompanied by intermittent periods of hail were encountered. The flight continued past Philadelphia for a few minutes toward Dover and the captain made a turn to the west in an attempt to avoid as much of the storm area as possible. The flight broke out in a clear area at about 15:17. The flight was able to continue VFR and descended to 8,000 feet. A second squall was encountered in the vicinity of Lynchburg at 15:50. The aircraft was slowed to 185 mph IAS, and light turbulence and buffeting were experienced. After breaking out of the storm at 15:54, the buffeting became so severe that the crew believed the aircraft would disintegrate before they could reach Byrd Field (now Richmond International Airport) to attempt an emergency landing. Airspeed was further reduced, but the buffeting continued. Two minutes later, and only a few miles short of the runway, the captain radioed an emergency and the flight descended.

The captain recognized Curles Neck Farm, selected the largest field, and landed straight ahead with the flaps up and the landing gear retracted. He felt it inadvisable to make any turn, lower the flaps, or otherwise to change the flight configuration, since the cause of the severe buffeting was unknown. During the last few moments of flight, as the nose of the aircraft touched high corn in a field, the copilot and flight engineer cut all switches. A power line pole at the edge of the corn field was struck by the right wing as the aircraft passed under the wires. After the plane passed over Curles Neck Road, a section of fence was torn down and the aircraft skidded 1,100 feet through a field and another fence, finally coming to rest in a pasture 265 feet from the second fence at 15:59. A localized fire developed outside of the No 4 engine, but was quickly extinguished by rain and the local fire department, who arrived at the scene within a short time.

There were no fatalities as a result of the emergency landing, and the Civil Aeronautics Board determined the probable cause of the accident to be the in-flight opening of the hydraulic access door, which caused extreme buffeting of the aircraft and resulted in the captain's decision to make an emergency landing. The airframe was salvaged and removed from Curles Neck aboard a barge that was towed down the James River. The aircraft was repaired and put back in service but was ultimately written off after suffering another accident in 1953.

== See also ==
- Richard Randolph of Curls Neck
