= Elk Hill (Goochland, Virginia) =

Historic house in Virginia, United States

- U.S. National Register of Historic Places
- Virginia Landmarks Register
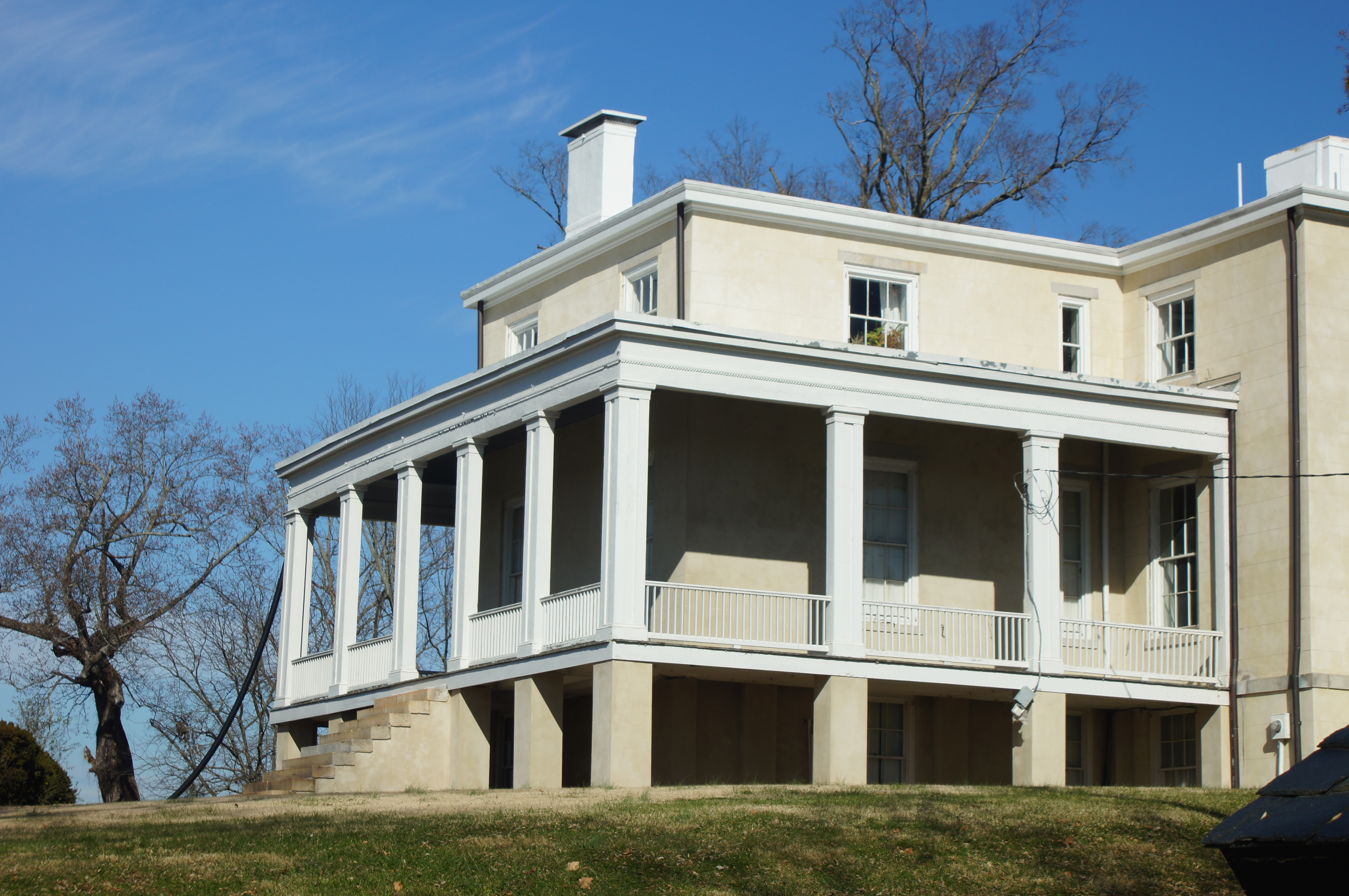

- Location within Virginia Location within the United States
- Location: W of Goochland off VA 6, near Goochland, Virginia
- Coordinates: 37°42′58″N 78°05′09″W
- Area: 35 acres (14 ha)
- Built: 1835-1839
- Architectural style: Greek Revival
- NRHP reference No.: 79003042
- VLR No.: 037-0009

Significant dates
- Added to NRHP: February 28, 1979
- Designated VLR: October 17, 1978

Elk Hill, also known as Harrison's Elk Hill, is a historic plantation home located near Goochland, Goochland County, Virginia. It was built between 1835 and 1839, and is a 2 1/2-story, three-bay, stuccoed brick central-hall-plan house in the Greek Revival style. It has a two-story rear ell. The front facade features a one-story Tuscan order portico consisting of paired rectangular wooden pillars supporting a full entablature. Also on the property are the contributing servants' quarters (some former slave quarters), tack house, and spring house. It was listed on the National Register of Historic Places in 1979.

== Elk Hill Farm ==
The Elk Hill children and family services organization was founded in 1970 when the Scott family decided to provide a steady, stable home for young men at the former Elk Hill plantation site. It was the first of six locations established in Virginia since 1970. Today the property is used by a residential program for young men, called Elk Hill Farm. The house retains the original plan and the school farms the land.

== Geography ==
The 35-acre Elk Hill property is located East of Elk Island and .8 miles east of James River and 1700 feet south of State Route 608. It is about 1.3 miles southwest of thee intersection of State Routes 608 and 6 and about 2.1 miles southwest of George's Tavern, a crossroads settlement named for the former tavern and inn established for travelers.

It is much smaller than the original Elk Hill plantation. Now, the land includes most of the hill that the house sits on. It is bounded by the contours of the hill on the north and south side of the property, partially by a drive on the east side, and the Chesapeake and Ohio Railway tracks on the western border of the property. It has a clear view of the James River.

== History ==
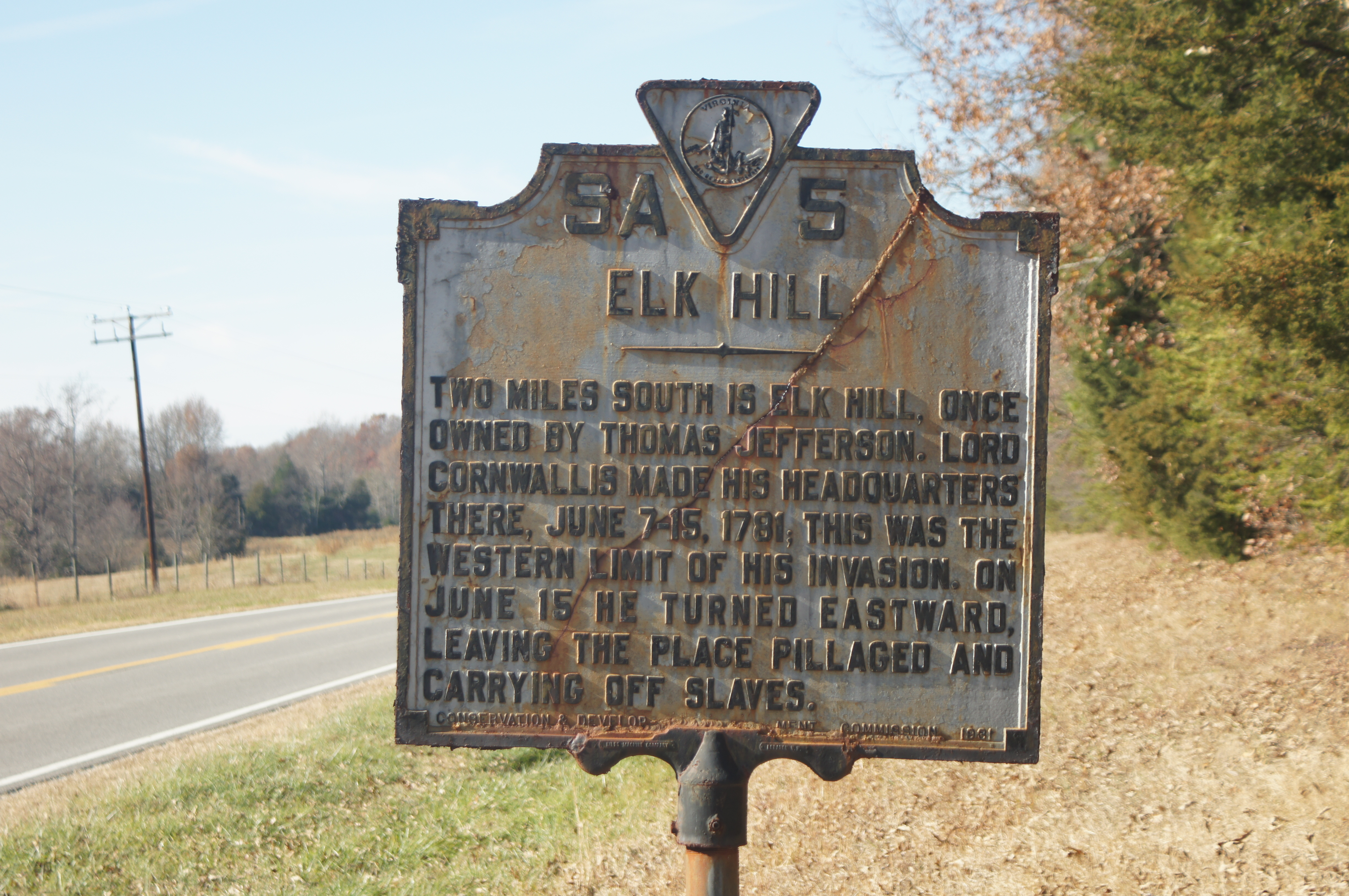
Historical marker at Elk Hill.

Elk Hill was a plantation located at the mouth of Byrd Creek and near Elk Island. John Woodson acquired a land patent in 1714 for property that included Elk Hill. It was purchased in 1746 by John Wayles, the father of Martha Wayles Skelton Jefferson. His daughter and her first husband, Bathurst Skelton, lived at Elk Hill during the two-year marriage that began in November 1766 and ended with his death in 1768. (Note: Bathurst Skelton also owned 1,000 acres on Elk Island. Both Skelton and later Thomas Jefferson used slaves to work the land.) Three hundred acres of Elk Hill was a component of the dowry for the marriage between Martha and Thomas Jefferson. The couple attained additional property following Wayles’ death in May 1773. Jefferson purchased additional adjacent property by May 1783. (Note: Jefferson acquired 307 acres along the James River, opposite Elk Island and to Byrd Creek. He acquired this property from John Wayles' estate. He added 312 acres along Byrd Creek in 1782 from Edward Smith. Another 50 acres were bought by Jefferson from Reuben and Judith Smith along Byrd Creek and along the acreage acquired in 1782.) In 1799, Jefferson sold Elk Hill with 669 acres to Thomas Augustus Taylor of Chesterfield County.

After a number of sales, Elk Hill was sold in 1832 to Randolph Harrison for his son Randolph Harrison Jr. (Note: Architect Gibson Wobson states that the land was transferred to Randolph Harrison, Jr. in 1812. He noted that the information was gathered from GCHS Magazine 10:2 (Autumn 1978) 4.) Randolph Harrison was a relative of Thomas Jefferson. Randolph Harrison Jr. who made a fortune on the tobacco trade, spent $15,000 to build the house. The Elk Hill house was situated on a hill overlooking James River and near the confluence with Byrd Creek. It was likely a frame house.

Later owner, Henningham Carrington Harrison operated a mill on Byrd Creek at Elk Hill about 1850. It was the largest of 20 mills in Goochland. Harrison operated both a grain mill and sawmill. The plantation conveyed their products to Richmond via canal boats and, beginning in the late 19th century, via railroad trains. Elk Hill was one of the railroad stops. In 1902, the property was purchased by Thomas Dudley Stokes. In 1908, the Stokes' secured and installed the Pocahontas Bell on the grounds. S. Buford Scott became the owner of Elk Hill in 1943. A stockbroker from Richmond, Scott used Elk Hill as a country home.

=== Revolutionary War ===
During the Revolutionary War, Elkhill was occupied by Lord Cornwallis and his men for ten days, during which they used the plantation as a temporary base of operations. During their stay they destroyed many of the crops on the plantation and slaughtered livestock for provisions. The plantation was also looted with 27 slaves taken as prisoners of war, 24 of which died of disease. Jefferson visited the site not long after Cornwallis left, and later recorded what he had seen in a letter to William Gordon in Paris. (Note: Jefferson's letter to William Gordon in Paris: Lord Cornwallis then proceeded to the point of fork, and encamped his army from thence all along the main James river to a seat of mine called Elkhill, opposite to Elk island and a little below the mouth of the Byrd creek. (You will see all these places exactly laid down in the map annexed to my Notes on Virginia printed by Stockdale.) He remained in this position ten days, his own head quarters being in my house at that place. I had had time to remove most of the effects out of the house. He destroyed all my growing crops of corn and tobacco, he burned all my barns containing the same articles of the last year, having first taken what corn he wanted, he used, as was to be expected, all my stocks of cattle, sheep, and hogs for the sustenance of his army, and carried off all the horses capable of service: of those too young for service he cut the throats, and he burnt all the fences on the plantation, so as to leave it an absolute waste. He carried off also about 30. slaves: had this been to give them freedom he would have done right, but it was to consign them to inevitable death from the small pox and putrid fever then raging in his camp. This I knew afterwards to have been the fate of 27. of them. I never had news of the remaining three, but presume they shared the same fate. When I say that Lord Cornwallis did all this, I do not mean that he carried about the torch in his own hands, but that it was all done under his eye, the situation of the house, in which he was, commanding a view of every part of the plantation, so that he must have seen every fire. I relate these things on my own knowledge in a great degree, as I was on the ground soon after he left it. — Jefferson to William Gordon, July 16, 1787)

=== Civil War ===
Elk Hill was plundered during the Civil War. Food and furnishings were removed from the house and some furnishings were destroyed.

=== Economic transition ===
Farmland has been sold and repurposed for commercial and residential development.
