= Howard's Neck Plantation =

Historic house in Virginia, United States

- U.S. National Register of Historic Places
- Virginia Landmarks Register
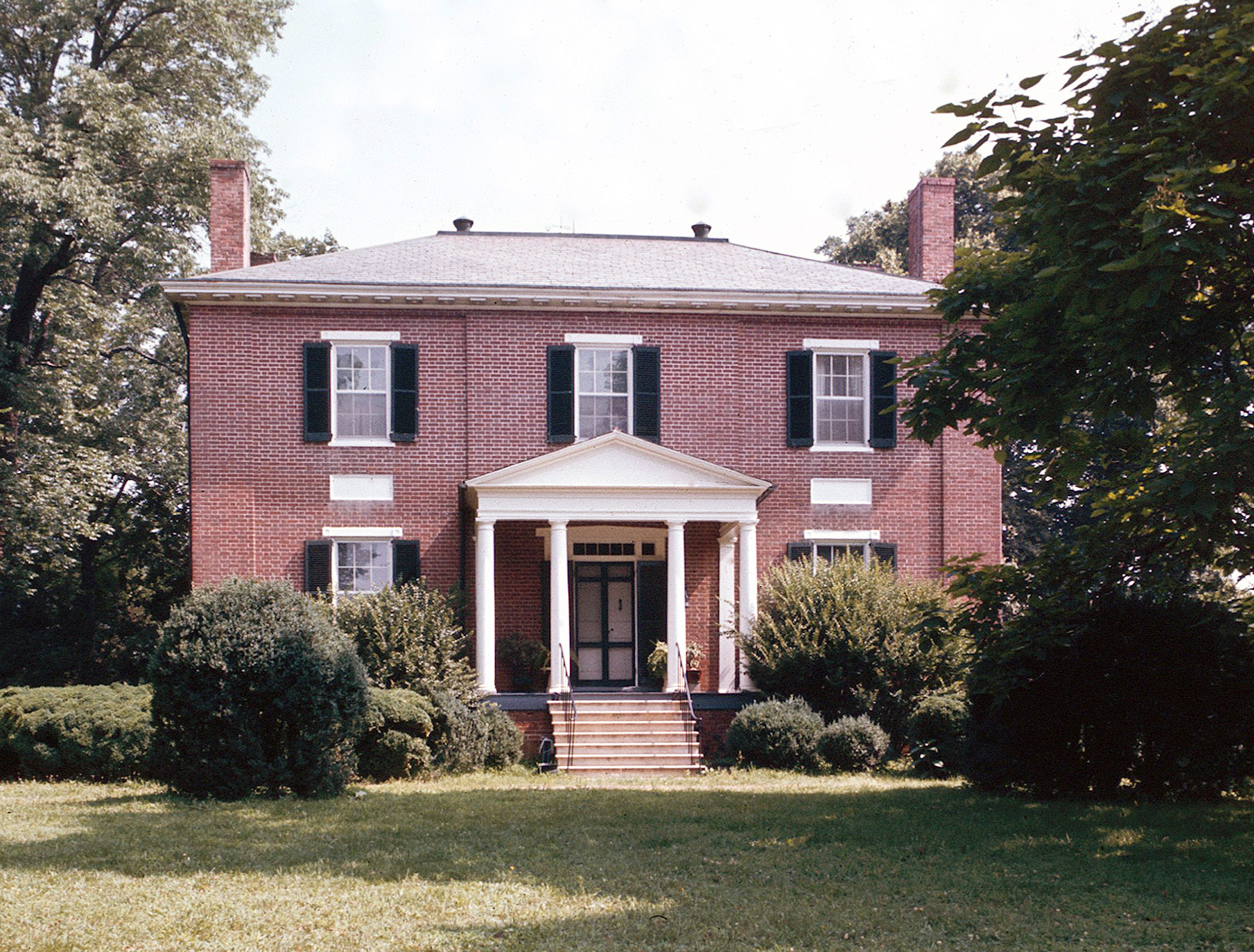
- Plantation house

- Location within Virginia Location within the United States
- Location: 1 mi. NW of Pemberton, near Pemberton, Virginia
- Coordinates: 37°40′45″N 78°05′29″W
- Area: 1,450 acres (590 ha)
- Built: c. 1825
- Architect: Mills, Robert
- Architectural style: Federal
- NRHP reference No.: 72001398
- VLR No.: 037-0100

Significant dates
- Added to NRHP: February 23, 1972
- Designated VLR: November 16, 1971

Howard's Neck Plantation is a historic house and plantation complex located near the unincorporated community of Pemberton, in Goochland County, Virginia. It was built about 1825, and is a two-story, three-bay brick structure in the Federal style. The house is similar in style to the works of Robert Mills. It has a shallow deck-on-hip roof and a small, one-story academically proportioned tetrastyle Roman Doric order portico.

Also on the property are other contributing buildings: A one-story frame house, said to be the original farm dwelling dating from colonial times; a 20th-century frame house, an early 19th-century brick kitchen, two frame smokehouses, a frame tool house, two early carriage houses and a harness house, three log slave quarters, the manager's house, and a sizable tobacco barn.

It was listed on the National Register of Historic Places in 1972.
