= William P. Moseley =

Virginia politician

Member of the Virginia Senate
- In office 1869–1871

Personal details
- Born: 1819
- Died: August 17, 1890 (aged 70–71)
- Party: Republican

William P. Moseley (1819 – August 17, 1890) was a successful businessman and Virginia state legislator during the Reconstruction era. He served in the Virginia Senate from 1869 to 1871.

== Early life ==
Moseley was born enslaved in Virginia in 1819 (possibly 1820) and he worked as a servant and on a freight boat. He became a free man by 1857, before the start of the American Civil War, when he married Martha Catherine Turpin the freed daughter of a neighbouring planter Edwin Turpin, and his enslaved partner, Mary James. Mary's brother, Henry Turpin served in the Virginia House of Delegates from 1871 to 1873.

He went on to educate himself and became reportedly, "well educated". After the war they lived in Richmond, Virginia, and he began to acquire land in both Goochland and Fluvanna counties. Together they had many children, with at least seven sons and six daughters by 1880. In the 1870 census he was listed as owning $250 of real estate as well as $194 of other personal property. Later he went on to purchase the plantation home of his former master as well as five hundred acres of land.

He was a successful man with the Bureau of Refugees, Freedmen, and Abandoned Lands placing him, in March 1867, top of a list of the county's most influential African Americans.

== Politics ==
In 1865 he was a delegate at the Virginia black convention and then, after receiving around 75% of the votes to do so, represented Goochland County at the Virginia Constitutional Convention from December 3, 1867, until April 17, 1868. At the convention he was appointed initially to the Committee on the Elective Franchise and Qualifications for Office and later assigned to the Committee on Military Affairs.

After the ratification of the new constitution he easily won against the other white Conservative candidate to represent Fluvanna, Goochland and Powhatan counties in the new Senate. Moseley was elected to the Virginia Senate serving from 1869 to 1871. He was appointed to the Committee on Banks serving in the lowest rank seat. He voted to ratify the Fifteenth Amendment to the United States Constitution and also on the controversial act Funding Act of 1871.

After serving just the one term he did not run for the next term but did remain active in politics and made an attempt to gain the nomination for the Goochland County seat in the Virginia House of Delegates but lost out to Henry Turpin his brother-in-law. He made another run for the state senate in 1873, running as an independent Republican after failing to get the Republican nomination, however he withdrew to avoid splitting the Republican ticket.

The Republicans of Goochland county endorsed him to run for the seventh congressional district of Virginia, and he accepted. At that time he was described as being "a colored man of respectable and reputable character" as well as being "a fair and just man". There was conflict within the Republican party, and Moseley was asked to withdraw from the race in the interest of party harmony. To this end a resolution was unanimously adopted and published formally asking for his withdrawal. He failed to get the nomination for Congress as a Republican as he lost out to the Readjuster Party candidate John Paul who won and served from 1881 to 1883.

== Death ==
Moseley died August 17, 1890, at home in Goochland County after a long illness, his wife Martha had died earlier the same year on January 24, 1890. He was survived by three of their sons and six of their daughters.

== See also ==
- African American officeholders from the end of the Civil War until before 1900

== Notes ==
Sometimes his name was written as William P. Mosely such as in the Virginia Senate Joint Resolution No. 89 and some newspaper articles.
