= Byrd Presbyterian Church =

Historic church in Virginia, United States

- U.S. National Register of Historic Places
- Virginia Landmarks Register
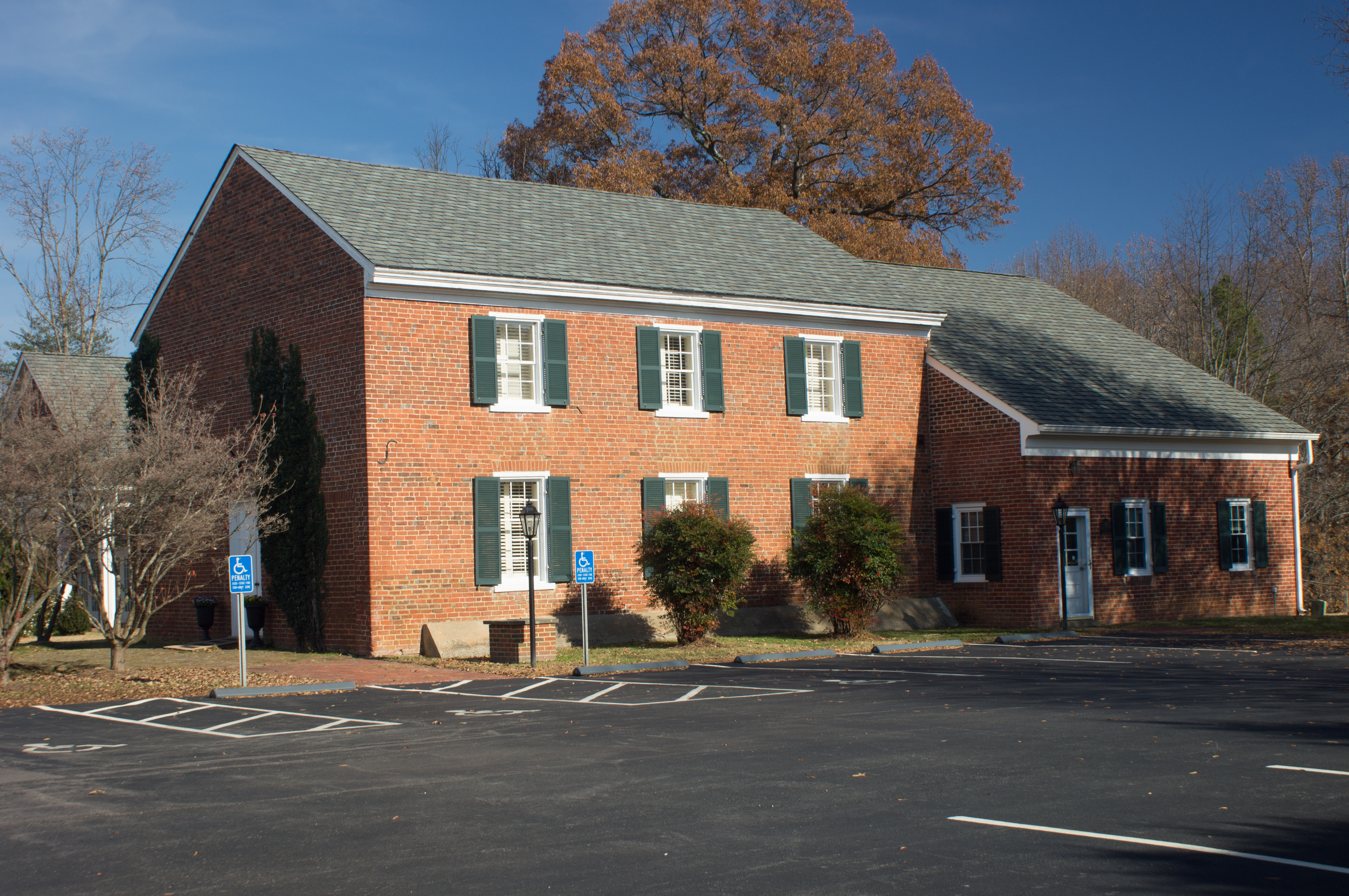
- Church sanctuary built in 1838.

- Location within Virginia Location within the United States
- Location: 2229 Dogtown Road, Goochland, Virginia
- Coordinates: 37°42′50″N 77°56′24″W
- Area: 4.5 acres (1.8 ha)
- Built: 1837
- Built by: Parrish, Valentine; Cosby, Albert
- Architectural style: Greek Revival
- NRHP reference No.: 00001438
- VLR No.: 037-0016

Significant dates
- Added to NRHP: November 22, 2000
- Designated VLR: September 13, 2000

Byrd Presbyterian Church is a historic Presbyterian church located at Goochland in western Goochland County, Virginia on Dogtown Road. The original building dates from 1838 and is still in active use today. It is a two-story, rectangular brick structure with a slate gable roof. The interior of the church measures 28 feet by 40 feet. Also on the property is a contributing church cemetery with graves dating back to at least the 1850s.

The original congregation began in 1748, and erected a dedicated building on Byrd Creek in 1759. Notable theologian Samuel Davies was one of the founding members.

It was listed on the National Register of Historic Places in 2000.
