= Eastin =

Eastin is a surname. Notable people with the surname include:

- Delaine Eastin (1947–2024), American politician and educator
- Ella Eastin (born 1997), American swimmer
- Jeff Eastin (born 1967), American television producer and screenwriter
- Matt Eastin (born 1979), American music video, documentary, and commercial director and editor
- Shannon Eastin (born 1970), American NFL official
- Steve Eastin (born 1948), American character actor
- Zachariah Eastin (1777–1852), American officer in the War of 1812
