= Goochland County Public Schools =

School district in Virginia, United States

Address
- 2938-I River Road W Goochland, Virginia, 23063; United States
- Coordinates: 37°40′58.1″N 77°53′3.5″W

District information
- Type: Public
- Grades: PreK–12
- NCES District ID: 5101650

Students and staff
- Students: 2,571 (2023–2024)
- Teachers: 187 (on an FTE basis)
- Staff: 298 (on an FTE basis)
- Student–teacher ratio: 13.75:1

Other information
- Website: goochlandschools.org

Goochland County Public Schools is a school district which serves Goochland County, Virginia, United States. It is based in Goochland, Virginia. The school division has five schools, each of which have been named Apple Distinguished Schools, 2019–2021.

== History ==
In 1973, Pearl P. Randolph, the first black member of the Goochland County School Board, submitted a suggestion to improve school bus safety in a contest held by the Wayne Corporation of Richmond, Indiana. Her winning entry, installing sound baffles in the ceilings, resulted in Goochland Country receiving a new Lifeguard school bus.

In September 1994, then superintendent Harold Absher went on voluntary leave from his position under unclear circumstances.

In November 2009, the district's superintendent posted an FAQ on its website about the potential effects of budget cuts on services. It noted that some things, such as maximum class sizes, are mandated by state or federal law or policy, but other things including athletics are not. "Right now, everything that isn’t mandated or required by the state or federal government is being considered," the page said.

In 2017, then superintendent, James Lane was named the Virginia Superintendent of the Year by the Virginia Association of Superintendents.

=== 2023 Comment, Censure, and Lawsuit ===
In 2023, then vice Chair Angela Allen posted a comment on her school board Facebook page regarding the District's policy on bathroom access for transgender students. In response to community pressure, the other 4 Board members formally censured Allen at the May 2023 Board meeting. In August 2023, Allen filed a defamation lawsuit against the other 4 members. In June 2024, the lawsuit was dismissed with prejudice finding that the Censure did not amount to defamation.

=== 2025 Superintendent firing ===
On April 1, 2025, African-American superintendent Dr. Michael Cromartie was fired without cause after holding the role for fewer than two years. One week later on April 8, 2025, the School Board announced Dr. Andy Armstrong, who is white, would be replacing Dr. Cromartie as superintendent. After the School Board declined to articulate specific reasons for the change, local community members insinuated the replacement was due to race.

== Schools ==
The district operates the following schools:

- Byrd Elementary School
- Goochland Elementary School
- Randolph Elementary School
- Goochland Middle School
- Goochland High School

All five of Goochland's schools have been fully-accredited by the state for over a decade. From 2018 to 2025, Niche.com has rated Goochland County Public Schools the #1 school division in the Richmond metro-region. In 2024, the on-time graduation rate was 96%. Goochland High School has been recognized for its strong athletics program in addition to strong academics.

== Leadership ==
The superintendent is Dr. Andrew "Andy" Armstrong.

=== School Board ===
The Goochland Country School Board consists of five members. As of May 2025, they are:

- District 1: L. Meredith Moses
- District 2: Karen M. Wirsing
- District 3: Angela S. Allen
- District 4: Michelle F. Maxwell
- District 5: M. Ellen Robinson

As of 2025, the district's website does not identify a chair. Local news station WTVR identifies Meredith Moses as the School Board Chair.

All 5 members were endorsed as a slate in 2023 by the Middle Resolution, a Republican Advocacy political action committee. Virginia public access records show that the committee for Board Chair Lucy Meredith Moses's school board candidacy received $8,092 in self-funding, $1500 from the Republican Party - Goochland County, and $500 from the Republican Party - 5th Congressional District.
