= Goochland County Court Square =

Historic courthouse in Virginia, US

- U.S. National Register of Historic Places
- U.S. Historic district
- Virginia Landmarks Register
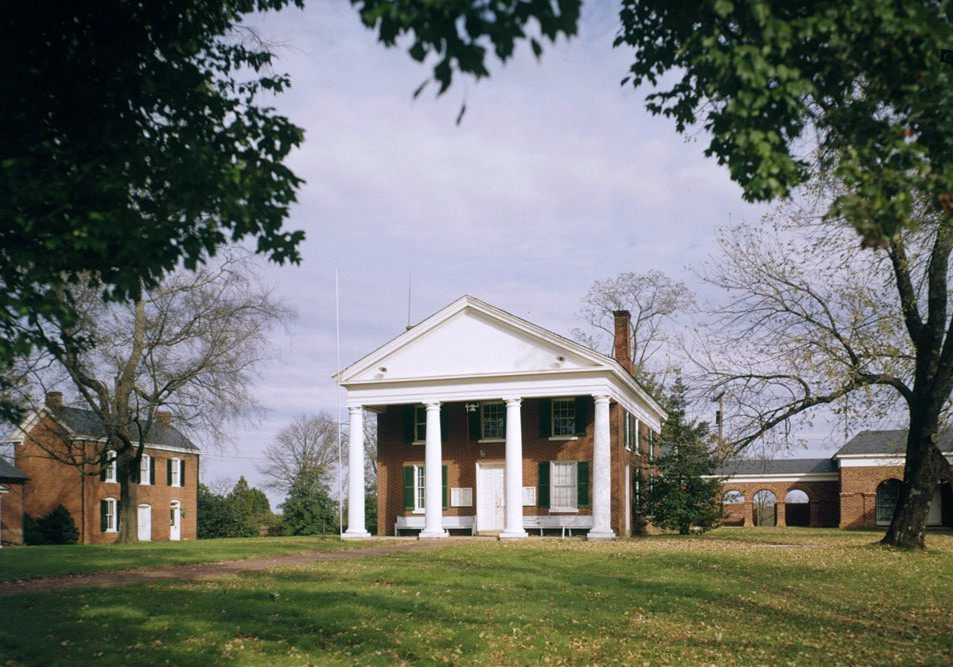
- Goochland County Courthouse, HABS Photo

- Location within Virginia Location within the United States
- Interactive map showing the location of Goochland County Courthouse
- Location: On VA 6, Goochland, Virginia
- Coordinates: 37°40′57″N 77°53′04″W
- Area: 10 acres (4.0 ha)
- Built: 1826
- Architect: Cosby, Dabney; Parrish, Valentine
- Architectural style: Early Republic, Roman Revival
- NRHP reference No.: 70000797
- VLR No.: 037-0136

Significant dates
- Added to NRHP: September 15, 1970
- Designated VLR: July 7, 1970

Goochland County Court Square is a historic county courthouse and national historic district located at Goochland, Goochland County, Virginia. It includes three contributing buildings and one contributing site. The Goochland County Court House was built in 1826 by Dabney Cosby, an architect of the area. It is a two-story, temple-form brick structure with a projecting pedimented tetrastyle Tuscan order portico.

Other buildings in the square include the 1848 two-story, hipped-roof stone jail; the original one-story, brick clerk's office; and a monument to the Confederate dead of Goochland County. The latter was erected in the late 19th or early 20th century.

The historic district was listed on the National Register of Historic Places in 1970.
