= Aint Gotta Dollar =

2022 single by Oliver Anthony

Single by Oliver Anthony
- Released: September 21, 2022
- Length: 2:04
- Label: Self-released
- Songwriter: Oliver Anthony
- Producer: Oliver Anthony

Oliver Anthony singles chronology
| "Aint Gotta Dollar" (2022) | "Rich Man's Gold" (2022) |

Music video
- "Aint Gotta Dollar" on YouTube

"Aint Gotta Dollar" is the debut single by American singer-songwriter Oliver Anthony, first uploaded to YouTube on September 10, 2022 and released to streaming services on September 21, 2022.

== Background and composition ==
The song is about Anthony enjoying a simple life without having to spend money, as long as his truck functions and he can make muscadine wine from the vine.

Anthony has said that people have reached out to tell him that the song had "connected with them in a powerful way".

== Critical reception ==
Billy Dukes of Taste of Country ranked "Aint Gotta Dollar" as the fourth best song by Oliver Anthony.

== Charts ==
=== Weekly charts ===
Weekly chart performance
| Chart (2022–2023) | Peak position |
|---|---|
| Canada Digital Songs (Billboard) | 8 |
| US Billboard Hot 100 | 82 |
| US Hot Country Songs (Billboard) | 21 |

=== Year-end charts ===
Annual chart rankings
| Chart (2023) | Rank |
|---|---|
| US Digital Song Sales (Billboard) | 55 |
