= Hymnal of a Troubled Man's Mind =

Studio album by Oliver Anthony
- Released: March 31, 2024
- Genre: Country
- Length: 38:52
- Producers: Oliver Anthony; Dave Cobb

Singles from Hymnal of a Troubled Man's Mind
- 1. "Rich Man's Gold" Released: May 28, 2022; 2. "Cobwebs and Cocaine" Released: November 23, 2022; 3. "Hell on Earth" Released: January 16, 2023; 4. "Feeling Purdy Good" Released: March 31, 2023; 5. "I Want to Go Home" Released: April 3, 2023; 6. "Always Love You Like a Good Old Dog" Released: April 6, 2023; 7. "Doggonit" Released: April 7, 2023; 8. "VCR Kid" Released: June 8, 2023; 9. "I've Got to Get Sober" Released: July 31, 2023

Hymnal of a Troubled Man's Mind is the debut studio album by American country music singer Oliver Anthony. It was released on March 31, 2024.

== Background ==
On March 29, 2024, without any previous indications, Anthony took to his social media accounts to announce the album, release date, and reveal its cover art. Anthony said "Hymnal of a Troubled Man's Mind is the story of my life, from 2013 until 2023. It is intended for the listener to sit down in a quiet place, undistracted, and just listen beginning to end. Every lyric, every note—every everything—is intentionally placed." While most of the tracks had already been released as acoustic recordings, they were re-recorded and provided new arrangements by producer Dave Cobb.

== Track listing ==
All tracks are written by Oliver Anthony.

Hymnal of a Troubled Man's Mind track listing
No.	Title	Length
1.	"From Ecclesiastes Chapter 5 (I)"	0:14
2.	"Rich Man's Gold"	2:20
3.	"From Ecclesiastes Chapter 5 (II)"	0:18
4.	"Doggonit"	3:50
5.	"I've Got to Get Sober"	4:02
6.	"From Ecclesiastes Chapter 4"	0:27
7.	"Cobwebs and Cocaine"	2:40
8.	"From Ecclesiastes Chapter 1"	1:20
9.	"Hell on Earth"	2:56
10.	"From Matthew Chapter 24"	1:18
11.	"I Want to Go Home"	3:21
12.	"Feeling Purdy Good"	2:45
13.	"From Proverbs Chapter 3"	0:40
14.	"Always Love You Like a Good Old Dog"	3:46
15.	"From Ecclesiastes Chapter 9"	0:41
16.	"VCR Kid"	3:54
17.	"From Matthew Chapter 10"	0:27
18.	"Momma's Been Hurting"	3:43
Total length:		38:52

== Charts ==
Chart performance for Hymnal of a Troubled Man's Mind
Chart (2024–2025)	Peak position
UK Album Downloads (Official Charts)	97
UK Americana Albums (Official Charts)	36
UK Christian & Gospel Albums (OCC)	12
US Heatseekers Albums (Billboard)	13
US Top Current Album Sales (Billboard)	42
