= Radiowv =

American YouTube and TikTok music channel

Radiowv (sometimes styled radiowv or RadioWV) is an American YouTube and TikTok music channel founded in 2018 to promote artists from Appalachia and surroundings that became more widely known in 2023 for videos by the country music artist Oliver Anthony. Radiowv features unsigned Americana and country musicians with videos of them playing unplugged in country settings, and is credited with “jumpstarting” some of its musicians' careers with the assistance of a so-called "Oliver Anthony Effect”.

Radiowv was mired in lawsuits for most of 2023.

== History ==
Radiowv claimed foundation by "two broke college students," later unveiled as Draven Riffe and John Price, who began posting videos in 2019. Radiowv solicited Anthony to record the latter's first song ever to not be recorded on Anthony's mobile phone, "Rich Men North of Richmond", which Riffe of Radiowv recorded on Anthony's land. Radiowv’s recording equipment was described as “very basic.” Radiowv posted this first song in early August 2023 and in less than two weeks it had generated more than 24 million views. Radiowv has published other Anthony material, and Riffe eventually became Oliver Anthony’s manager.

Radiowv was the subject of disputes between its owner and a former partner which began in earnest in April 2023, when, according to Radiowv, the former partner locked the owner out of the Radiowv social media accounts, leading to a lawsuit by Radiowv ownership in May of that year and a settlement in June which dissolved the partnership, among other agreements. In October, Radiowv sued the former partner, alleging, among others, the poaching of music recordings of the artist Jake Kohn. The former partner countersued in November, alleging royalty disputes, among other issues.

As of August 2023 Radiowv had also signed with Logan Halstead from West Virginia, Drayton Farley from Alabama, and Nolan Taylor from Ohio; by the end of the year, it had in addition posted videos by performers Charles Wesley Godwin, Cole Chaney, and Sydney Adams. Radiowv is credited with helping drive millions of views to Halstead and Taylor, leading to them touring as performing artists, and signing with recording labels.

In late 2023, Taylor said Radiowv had “put a spotlight” on Appalachian musicians generally, promoting their careers. In 2024, Anthony indicated that the most-listened-to songs of his were those recorded by Radiowv.

== Critical reception ==
The Tennessean described Radiowv as "an independent country tastemaker" in August 2023. Drew Magary wrote that generally "the channel has no discernible political bent". At the end of the same year, Radiowv was declared “obscure”, prior to its 2023 hits.

== Bibliography ==
- Wickstrom, Matt (1 December 2023). "How RadioWV, the Platform That Helped Launch Oliver Anthony, is Providing an Outlet for Appalachian Songwriters". Wide Open Country.
