= Goochland County, Virginia =

County in Virginia, United States

- County
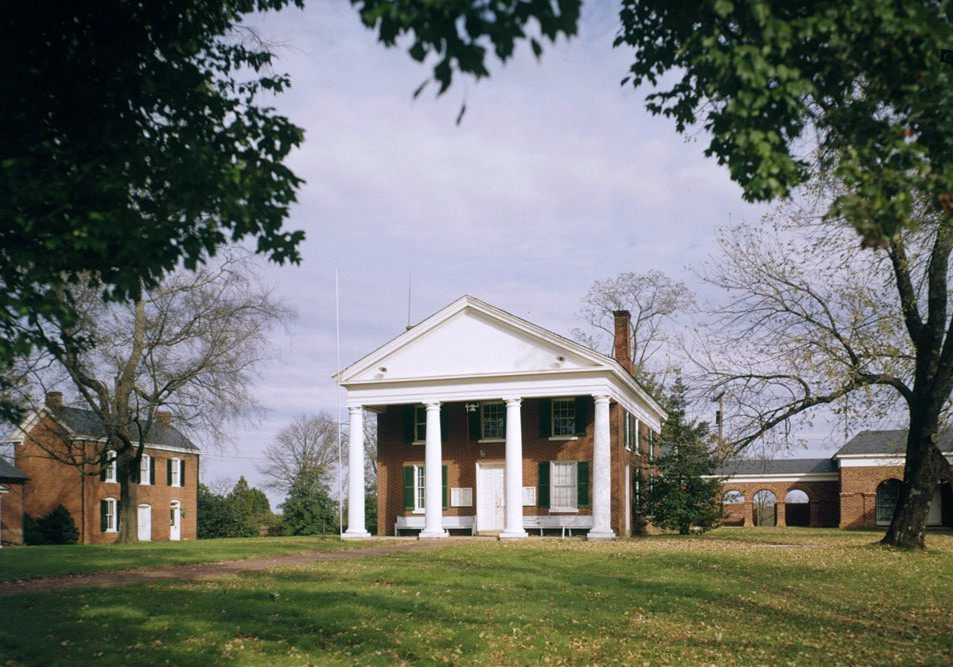
- Goochland County Court Square

- Seal

- Location within the U.S. state of Virginia
- Coordinates: 37°43′N 77°56′W
- Country: United States
- State: Virginia
- Founded: 1728
- Named for: Sir William Gooch
- Seat: Goochland

Area
  - Total: 290 sq mi (750 km^{2})
  - Land: 281 sq mi (730 km^{2})
  - Water: 8 sq mi (21 km^{2}) 2.9%

Population (2020)
  - Total: 24,727
  - Estimate (2025): 29,187 ▲
  - Density: 88.0/sq mi (34.0/km^{2})
- Time zone: UTC−5 (Eastern)
  - Summer (DST): UTC−4 (EDT)
- Congressional district: 5th
- Website: www.goochlandva.us

Goochland County is a county located in the Piedmont of the Commonwealth of Virginia. Its southern border is formed by the James River. As of the 2020 census, the population was 24,727. Its county seat is Goochland.

Goochland County is included in the Greater Richmond Region.

== History ==
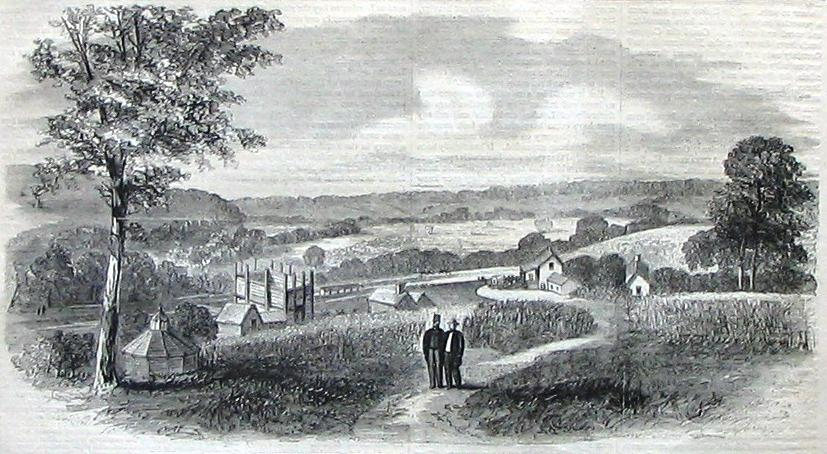
Dover Mills, depicted in 1865

=== Native Americans ===
See Native American tribes in Virginia

Long before the arrival of Europeans in the 17th century, all of the territory of Virginia, including the Piedmont area, was populated by various tribes of Native Americans. They were the historic tribes descended from thousands of years of succeeding and varied indigenous cultures. Among the historic tribes in the Piedmont were the Monacan, who were recorded as having several villages west of what the colonists later called Manakin Town on the James River.

They and other Siouan tribes traditionally competed with and were in conflict with the members of the Powhatan Confederacy, Algonquian-speaking tribes who generally inhabited the coastal Tidewater area along the Atlantic and the rivers feeding it. They also were subject to raids by Iroquois nations from the north, who were based south of the Great Lakes in present-day New York and Pennsylvania.

By the end of the 17th century, the Monacan had been decimated by warfare and infectious diseases carried by the mostly English colonists and traders; their survivors were absorbed into other Siouan tribes.

Portions of the historic Three Chopt Trail, a Native American trail, run through a large portion of the county. The trail was marked by three hatchet chops in trees to show the way. The modern-day U.S. Route 250 roughly follows this route from Richmond to Charlottesville.

=== Henrico Shire ===
In 1634, the colonial government organized the territory of Virginia into eight shires, to be governed as shires in England. Henrico was one of these shires.

=== Formation of Goochland County ===
Among the earliest European settlers in this area of the Piedmont were several hundred French Huguenot religious refugees, who were given land in 1700 and 1701 by the Crown and colonial authorities about 20 miles above the falls of the James River. They settled the villages collectively known as Manakin-Sabot in this area. Soon they moved out to farms and plantations they developed. In neighboring Powhatan County, to the south across the James, they settled Manakin Town, but by 1750 had mostly moved out to farms.

Goochland was founded in 1728 as the first county formed from Henrico Shire, followed by Chesterfield County in 1749. Goochland originally included all of the land from Tuckahoe Creek, on both sides of the James River, west as far as the Blue Ridge Mountains. In its original form, Goochland contained the modern counties of Goochland, Powhatan, Cumberland, Fluvanna, Buckingham, Nelson, and Amherst, in their entireties. In addition, the northern sections of Appomattox, Campbell, and Bedford, and the southern two-thirds of Albemarle County were also within Goochland's original boundaries. The creation of Albemarle County in 1744 and Cumberland County in 1749 removed most of Goochland's southern and western territory, reducing it to its modern size and boundaries.

The county was named for Sir William Gooch, 1st Baronet, the royal lieutenant governor from 1727 to 1749. The nominal governor, the Earl of Albemarle, had remained in England. As acting royal governor, Gooch promoted settlement of the Virginia backcountry as a means to insulate the Virginia colony from Native American and New France settlements in the Ohio Country. As the colonists moved into the Piedmont west of Richmond, they first developed tobacco plantations like those in Tidewater Virginia. Following the American Revolutionary War, tobacco did not yield as high profits as markets changed. In Goochland, as in other areas of Virginia, many planters switched to growing wheat and mixed crops. This reduced their need for labor. In the early nineteenth century, some planters sold slaves in the domestic slave trade, as demand was high in the developing Deep South where cotton plantations were developed.

=== Goochland Courthouse ===
The first court was held in May 1728. The exact location of this first court is unknown, but researchers believe that the first courthouse was constructed in Goochland County between 1730 and 1737. During the August session in 1730, James Skelton, who was later commissioned to build the Second Capitol at Williamsburg, was contracted. It was to be 36 foot long and 20 foot wide. A new courthouse was built in 1763 in Beaverdam, a short distance from the first, on the land of Alexander Baine. In the early 19th century, the courthouse was moved to its current location along Rt. 6 in central Goochland. The Goochland County Court Square was listed on the National Register of Historic Places in 1970.

=== Revolutionary War ===
During the early part of 1781, Lord Cornwallis marched his sizable army through the boundaries of Goochland. They occupied and thoroughly destroyed Elkhill, a small estate of Thomas Jefferson, slaughtering the livestock for food, burning barns and fences, and finally burning down the house. They took 27 slaves as prisoners of war, and 24 died of disease in the camp.

One point along the James River came to be known as Cornwallis Hill. It is said that the British general, who paused here on his way to Yorktown, where he would be defeated and surrender, remarked that this spot with its magnificent vista of the James River Valley would make an ideal site for a house.

General Lafayette, a French hero of the Revolution, returned to the United States for a grand tour in 1824 and 1825. On November 2, 1824, General Lafayette "left Richmond on his way to Monticello to visit Mr. Jefferson." On the way, Gen. Lafayette stopped at Powell's Tavern in Goochland. ("I spent some time at the Tavern and there was much celebration at his arrival.") While there, the general met with American officers and many citizens of the county.

=== Civil War ===
The county was a site of a battle late in the war. When the war broke out, James Pleasants, a native of Goochland County and descendant of the 22nd governor of the state, insisted he replace his uncle in the Goochland Light Dragoons (known during the war as Co. F, 4th Virginia Cavalry). In 1861, he was allowed to take his uncle's place. In the winter of 1864, any troops who were close to home were allowed to return to recruit more soldiers.

At the same time, the young Union Colonel Ulric Dahlgren had a plan to infiltrate central Virginia, break out nearly 12,000 Union prisoners from Belle Isle in Richmond, the Confederate capital, and destroy the city. On March 1, 1864, Dahlgren's forces reached the plantations of Sabot Hill, Dover, and Eastwood in eastern Goochland.

On Pleasants's first night home, Dahlgren's raiders stole his horses but did not search the property. When Pleasants found out what happened, he grabbed his carbine and started off on foot after the raiders. Hearing a noise, he hid in the woods, and ordered a single Union cavalryman to surrender. Pleasants mounted the man's horse and forced the soldier to walk in front of him to search for more soldiers. Within a short amount of time, Pleasants had captured several Union prisoners and took them as prisoners back to Bowles' store. In all, he captured 15 Union soldiers, recovered 16 horses, and shot one officer who refused to surrender to him.

Eastwood was occupied by Plumer Hobson and his wife, the daughter of Brigadier General Henry A. Wise, the last governor of Virginia before the war. On the previous night General Wise had arrived at Eastwood. When a Union detail arrived at Eastwood looking for him, his daughter said that he was in Charleston, South Carolina. Instead, he was already riding rapidly southeast to Richmond to warn the troops of the Union raiders. Dahlgren went to Sabot Hill, the home of James Seddon and his wife. She answered the door and invited the officer in for some wine and Southern hospitality; she knew that Wise was on his way to Richmond and wanted to delay Dahlgren. Ultimately, due to the quick thinking by the families in Goochland, Wise was able to warn forces in Richmond, who defeated Dahlgren's raid.

=== Convict lease program ===
After Reconstruction, Goochland County leased convicts as laborers to build roads in 1878. The state's practice of convict leasing was effectively a means of keeping African Americans in near-slavery conditions. The legislature passed a variety of minor nuisance laws, with penalties of fees, which they knew the cash-poor sharecroppers could not readily pay. When convicted of minor offenses and unable to pay the fine, black men were jailed and leased out as convicts. They suffered frequent abuse under this system, as the state exercised little supervision of conditions.

=== Monument ===
As part of their effort at commemoration after the war, the Daughters of the Confederacy commissioned a monument to the Confederate dead, to be erected on the green of the Goochland Courthouse. It was unveiled on June 22, 1918. Among those in attendance was Robert E. Lee, a grandson of General Robert E. Lee.

=== Churches ===
In 1720, there were two parishes in Henrico County, St. James and Henrico. When Goochland County was formed, St. James Parish fell within the boundaries on both sides of the James River and westward. When Albemarle County was formed from Goochland in 1744, the Parish was divided into three. St. Anne's Parish covered Albemarle, St. James Southam Parish covered the south side of the river (now Powhatan County), and St. James Northam Parish covered the rest of Goochland.

In St. James Northam Parish there were three early churches, all Anglican (and Episcopal after the church was disestablished after the Revolution): Dover Episcopal, Beaverdam Episcopal, and Lickinghole Episcopal. Dover was the first, being built in 1724; it closed sometime after the Revolutionary War. Its location and closing date are unknown. Beaverdam was located near what is now Whitehall Road, but its exact location is also unknown.

One notable church is Byrd Presbyterian Church. The congregation has some members descended from the original worshippers who were organized in 1748 at Tucker Woodson's farm by Samuel Davies, a theologian. He later served as president of Princeton University. By 1759 the group had constructed its own building on Byrd Creek. In 1838 descendants of the original congregation built a new church and began worshiping here; this church is still in use. It retains many of its original architectural features, including its slate roof and interior window valances. The cemetery has been preserved since it was established in 1838.

One of the first independent black congregations founded after the Civil War was what is now called Second Union Baptist Church, founded in 1865 near Fife/Bula northwest of Richmond. Most freedmen left white Baptist churches to form their own, and soon set up state associations with the aid of organizers from free states. Today the numerous churches in the county include several Episcopal, Baptist, Methodist, Presbyterian, and non-denominational Christian churches.

=== Historic homes ===
- Tuckahoe Plantation – One of the older James River plantation mansions in the county, it has grounds that include a private schoolhouse where Thomas Jefferson and his Randolph cousins were educated.
- Sabot Hill – Built in 1855, it was owned by James A. Seddon, the Secretary of War for the Confederate States of America (CSA) during the Civil War. The large home was damaged in Dahlgren's Raid.
- Woodlawn – This is a Georgian Colonial-style home built prior to 1760 by Josiah Leake. In 1834 it was purchased by Colonel Thomas Taylor, a hero of the Mexican–American War.
- Clover Forest Plantation – The land was first patented in 1714. The central core of the home was not built until 1807–1811, by Captain Thomas Pemberton of the Continental Dragoons. He was later a member of the Society of the Cincinnati. It has had several owners since then.

Other historic homes and mansions in Goochland can be found through the Goochland County Historical Society (see links below).

== Government ==
In 2012, the county left the Virginia Association of Counties, becoming the only county in Virginia that isn't a member, due to disagreements over a state constitutional amendment that would prevent eminent domain from being used for economic development, as well as the Board of Supervisors feeling that the high costs that it was paying did not adequately reflect its values. They also left the National Association of Counties.

The county is the smallest in the country to receive three AAA ratings from the three bond agencies.

=== Board of Supervisors ===
- District 1: Jonathan Christy (Chair)
- District 2: Neil Spoonhower (Vice Chair)
- District 3: Tom Winfree
- District 4: Charlie Vaughters
- District 5: Jonathan Lyle

=== Constitutional officers ===
- Clerk of the Circuit Court: Amanda S. Adams (R)
- Commissioner of the Revenue: Jennifer Brown (I)
- Commonwealth's Attorney: Tara Mcgee (R)
- Sheriff: Steven N. Creasey (I)
- Treasurer: Pamela Duncan (R)

=== State and federal representation ===
Goochland is represented by Republicans Tom Garrett and David Owen in the House of Delegates, Democrats Timothy M. Kaine and Mark Warner in the U.S. Senate, and Republican John McGuire in the U.S. House of Representatives.

=== Education ===
The sole school district in the county is Goochland County Public Schools. The school system provides public school from K-12 for the county at five schools for 2,500 students.

In 2020 the all-boys Benedictine College Preparatory and all-girls Saint Gertrude High School moved from their separate campuses in downtown Richmond to a combined campus in Goochland under the Benedictine Schools of Richmond.

=== Departments ===
==== Fire-Rescue ====
===== History =====
In 1951, following the burning of the 96-year old Dover Baptist Church, a group of volunteers formed a volunteer fire department, with a fire engine that had been bought from the City of Richmond for use on Pembroke farm. A Henrico County fire captain led the first training class of 20 volunteers, who graduated in 1952, and by 1953, a new station was built in Manakin-Sabot. Two new companies were quickly established in Crozier and Centerville, all under the name of the Dover-Pembroke Fire Department Association. Used Virginia State Police radios replaced the initial telephone tree dispatch system. 3 new stations were established between 1956 and 1962: Goochland-Fife, Goochland Courthouse, and Hadensville.

Initially, local funeral homes and sometimes the Tuckahoe Volunteer Rescue Squad transported patients requiring medical attention to local hospitals, but in 1966, volunteer rescue squads began to organize and were incorporated into the fire department. By 2003, medical and crash rescue services had been added to each fire station.

Hurricane Agnes in 1972 caused extensive damage throughout Goochland and especially along the James River Basin, leading to the formation of the Water Rescue Team.

===== Stations =====
Goochland currently has 39 apparatus hosted at its 6 stations. A new station, Sandy Hook, is currently being constructed. A training center hosts additional support vehicles.

United States presidential election results for Goochland County, Virginia
Year	Republican		Democratic		Third party(ies)	
Year	No.	%	No.	%	No.	%
1912	114	21.76%	322	61.45%	88	16.79%
1916	193	31.59%	413	67.59%	5	0.82%
1920	212	35.22%	384	63.79%	6	1.00%
1924	164	27.42%	394	65.89%	40	6.69%
1928	318	42.18%	431	57.16%	5	0.66%
1932	166	20.49%	629	77.65%	15	1.85%
1936	228	26.21%	638	73.33%	4	0.46%
1940	180	17.93%	820	81.67%	4	0.40%
1944	230	24.86%	691	74.70%	4	0.43%
1948	292	25.61%	683	59.91%	165	14.47%
1952	714	46.12%	820	52.97%	14	0.90%
1956	748	50.10%	508	34.03%	237	15.87%
1960	851	48.66%	862	49.29%	36	2.06%
1964	1,241	46.01%	1,452	53.84%	4	0.15%
1968	1,216	35.13%	1,389	40.13%	856	24.73%
1972	2,127	60.98%	1,254	35.95%	107	3.07%
1976	2,104	47.23%	2,259	50.71%	92	2.07%
1980	2,423	49.68%	2,290	46.96%	164	3.36%
1984	3,404	60.60%	2,178	38.78%	35	0.62%
1988	3,765	62.61%	2,209	36.74%	39	0.65%
1992	3,834	51.26%	2,589	34.62%	1,056	14.12%
1996	4,119	55.47%	2,784	37.49%	522	7.03%
2000	5,378	61.27%	3,197	36.42%	202	2.30%
2004	6,668	64.50%	3,583	34.66%	87	0.84%
2008	7,643	60.84%	4,813	38.31%	106	0.84%
2012	8,448	63.45%	4,676	35.12%	191	1.43%
2016	8,384	59.73%	4,889	34.83%	764	5.44%
2020	9,966	58.80%	6,685	39.44%	299	1.76%
2024	11,521	58.36%	7,875	39.89%	346	1.75%

== Economy ==
=== West Creek Business Park ===
Contributors to Goochland's increased growth in the early 2000s was the construction of the West Creek Business Park, as well as the completion of Richmond's semi-circumferential State Route 288. The latter connected the county to the major travel corridors of I-64 and I-95. The industrial park began attracting many businesses, including the corporate headquarters for Farm Bureau of Virginia and Performance Food Group (PFG), as well as Hallmark Youth Care and CarMax.

=== Top employers ===
According to the county's 2011 Comprehensive Annual Financial Report, the top employers in the county are:

#	Employer	# of employees	Community
1	Capital One	5,600	West Creek Business Park
2	CarMax	987	West Creek Business Park
3	Luck Stone	331	Manakin-Sabot
4	Virginia Farm Bureau	300	West Creek Business Park
5	Federal Reserve Bank of Richmond	200	West Creek Business Park
6	Performance Food Group	180	West Creek Business Park
7	Hermitage Country Club	150	Manakin-Sabot
8	Food Lion	110	Manakin-Sabot and Goochland
9	Elk Hill	100	Goochland

== Geography ==
According to the U.S. Census Bureau, the county has a total area of 290 square miles (750 km^{2}), of which 281 square miles (730 km^{2}) is land and 8 square miles (21 km^{2}) (2.9%) is water. Goochland County is drained by the James River.

Goochland, VA

Climate chart (precipitation, max. and min. temperature)
J	F	M	A	M	J	J	A	S	O	N	D
2.9 46 24	2.8 50 26	3.7 59 32	3.2 69 42	4 77 50	3.6 85 60	4.4 88 64	3.8 87 63	3.7 80 55	3.5 70 44	3.7 60 35	3.1 49 27
- █ Average max. and min. temperatures in °F
- █ Precipitation totals in inches
Metric conversion
J	F	M	A	M	J	J	A	S	O	N	D
74 8 −4	71 10 −3	94 15 0	81 21 5	102 25 10	91 29 16	112 31 18	97 30 17	94 27 13	89 21 7	94 15 1	79 10 −3
- █ Average max. and min. temperatures in °C
- █ Precipitation totals in mm

=== Adjacent counties ===
- Louisa County – north
- Hanover County – northeast
- Henrico County – east
- Powhatan County – south
- Cumberland County – southwest
- Fluvanna County – west

=== Major highways ===
- I-64 - Skirts the northern county line with Louisa County
- US 250 - Runs parallel to I-64, also skirting the Louisa County line
- US 522 - Runs through the county, intersecting with SR 6 as well as both US-250 and I-64 in Louisa County
- SR 6 - Runs along the James River in the southern part of the county
- SR 45 - Runs north from Cartersville in Cumberland County to SR 6
- SR 271 - Runs from Henrico County to Hanover County across the north east corner of the county
- SR 288 - Runs along the eastern county line from I-64 to Powhatan County

== Demographics ==
Historical population
Census	Pop.	Note	%±
1790	9,053		—
1800	9,696		7.1%
1810	10,203		5.2%
1820	10,007		−1.9%
1830	10,369		3.6%
1840	9,760		−5.9%
1850	10,352		6.1%
1860	10,656		2.9%
1870	10,313		−3.2%
1880	10,292		−0.2%
1890	9,958		−3.2%
1900	9,519		−4.4%
1910	9,237		−3.0%
1920	8,863		−4.0%
1930	7,953		−10.3%
1940	8,454		6.3%
1950	8,934		5.7%
1960	9,206		3.0%
1970	10,069		9.4%
1980	11,761		16.8%
1990	14,163		20.4%
2000	16,863		19.1%
2010	21,717		28.8%
2020	24,727		13.9%
2025 (est.)	29,187	▲	18.0%
U.S. Decennial Census; 1790–1960 1900–1990; 1990–2000 2010 2020

=== Racial and ethnic composition ===
Goochland County, Virginia – Racial and ethnic composition Note: the US Census treats Hispanic/Latino as an ethnic category. This table excludes Latinos from the racial categories and assigns them to a separate category. Hispanics/Latinos may be of any race.
Race / Ethnicity (NH = Non-Hispanic)	Pop 1980	Pop 1990	Pop 2000	Pop 2010	Pop 2020	% 1980	% 1990	% 2000	% 2010	% 2020
White alone (NH)	7,427	9,880	12,194	16,583	19,081	63.15%	69.76%	72.31%	76.36%	77.17%
Black or African American alone (NH)	4,251	4,200	4,298	4,151	3,252	36.14%	29.65%	25.49%	19.11%	13.15%
Native American or Alaska Native alone (NH)	6	16	32	50	58	0.05%	0.11%	0.19%	0.23%	0.23%
Asian alone (NH)	15	32	68	219	493	0.13%	0.23%	0.40%	1.01%	1.99%
Native Hawaiian or Pacific Islander alone (NH)	x	x	2	4	3	x	x	0.01%	0.02%	0.01%
Other race alone (NH)	5	2	5	25	146	0.04%	0.01%	0.03%	0.12%	0.59%
Mixed race or Multiracial (NH)	x	x	120	230	832	x	x	0.71%	1.06%	3.36%
Hispanic or Latino (any race)	57	33	144	455	862	0.48%	0.23%	0.85%	2.10%	3.49%
Total	11,761	14,163	16,863	21,717	24,727	100.00%	100.00%	100.00%	100.00%	100.00%

=== 2020 census ===
As of the 2020 census, the county had a population of 24,727. The median age was 49.5 years. 17.5% of residents were under the age of 18 and 23.1% of residents were 65 years of age or older. For every 100 females there were 90.7 males, and for every 100 females age 18 and over there were 87.7 males age 18 and over.

Racial and ethnic composition is shown above in the table.

7.3% of residents lived in urban areas, while 92.7% lived in rural areas.

There were 9,780 households in the county, of which 24.7% had children under the age of 18 living with them and 20.0% had a female householder with no spouse or partner present. About 22.3% of all households were made up of individuals and 9.8% had someone living alone who was 65 years of age or older.

There were 10,550 housing units, of which 7.3% were vacant. Among occupied housing units, 83.3% were owner-occupied and 16.7% were renter-occupied. The homeowner vacancy rate was 1.6% and the rental vacancy rate was 5.4%.

=== 2000 census ===
As of the census of 2000, there were 16,863 people, 6,158 households, and 4,710 families residing in the county. The population density was 59 people per square mile (23 people/km^{2}). There were 6,555 housing units at an average density of 23 units per square mile (8.9 units/km^{2}). The racial makeup of the county was 72.71% White, 25.64% Black or African American, 0.20% Native American, 0.47% Asian, 0.01% Pacific Islander, 0.20% from other races, and 0.77% from two or more races. 0.85% of the population were Hispanic or Latino of any race.

The largest ethnic/ancestry groups in Goochland County are: "English" (16.3%), American (13.0%), German (11.8%), Irish (9.3%), Scots-Irish (4.0%) and Scottish (3.9%).

There were 6,158 households, out of which 29.90% had children under the age of 18 living with them, 64.60% were married couples living together, 8.40% had a female householder with no husband present, and 23.50% were non-families. 19.90% of all households were made up of individuals, and 7.40% had someone living alone who was 65 years of age or older. The average household size was 2.51 and the average family size was 2.88.

In the county, the population was spread out, with 21.30% under the age of 18, 5.30% from 18 to 24, 32.10% from 25 to 44, 28.90% from 45 to 64, and 12.50% who were 65 years of age or older. The median age was 40 years. For every 100 females, there were 101.50 males. For every 100 females age 18 and over, there were 98.30 males.

The median income for a household in the county was $56,307, and the median income for a family was $64,685. Males had a median income of $41,663 versus $29,519 for females. The per capita income for the county was $29,105. 6.90% of the population and 4.30% of families were below the poverty line. Out of the total people living in poverty, 7.70% are under the age of 18 and 8.10% are 65 or older.

== Notable people ==
- Edward Bates, 26th United States attorney general under President Abraham Lincoln.
- Zachariah Eastin (1777–1852), War of 1812 officer; born in Goochland County
- John Hicks, catcher and first baseman for the Detroit Tigers
- Giles Beecher Jackson (1853–1924), African-American lawyer, newspaper publisher, entrepreneur, and civil rights activist
- Thomas Jefferson, lived at Shadwell, then within the boundaries of the county
- John Berry Meachum, businessman, educator and founder of the oldest black church in Missouri
- James Pleasants, 22nd governor of Virginia
- Thomas Mann Randolph Jr., 21st governor of Virginia
- James Seddon, Confederate Secretary of War under Jefferson Davis
- Justin Verlander, San Francisco Giants, Houston Astros, and most prominently Detroit Tigers starting pitcher; was raised in the county
- Henry Turpin (1836–1908), African-American Republican politician and member of the Virginia House of Delegates during the Reconstruction era
- Josephine Turpin Washington (1861–1949), African-American educator and writer who clerked for Frederick Douglass and taught at Tuskegee Institute

== Communities ==
No incorporated communities are located in Goochland County. Unincorporated communities include the following:

=== Census-designated place ===
- Goochland

=== Other unincorporated communities ===
- Centerville
- Crozier
- Fife
- Hadensville
- Maidens
- Manakin-Sabot
- Oilville
- Pickels
- Sandy Hook
- Shannon Hill

== See also ==
- National Register of Historic Places listings in Goochland County, Virginia
