= Goochland, Virginia =

Census-designated place in Virginia, US

- Census-designated place
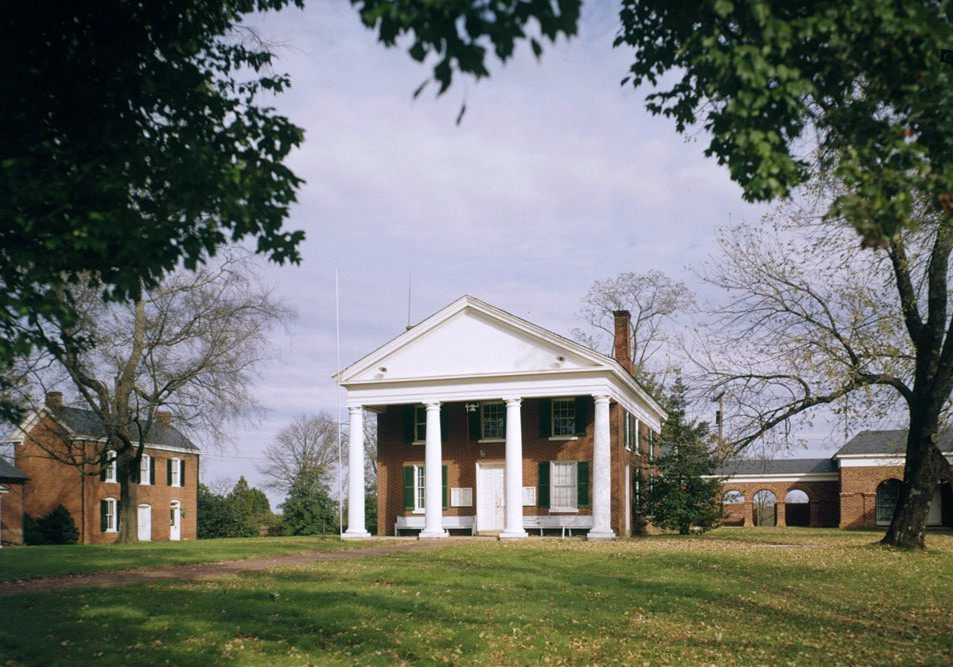
- Goochland County Courthouse

- Location within Virginia Location within the United States
- Coordinates: 37°41′4″N 77°53′7″W
- Country: United States
- State: Virginia
- County: Goochland
- Named for: Sir William Gooch, 1st Baronet

Area
  - Total: 4.5 sq mi (11.7 km^{2})
  - Land: 4.5 sq mi (11.6 km^{2})
  - Water: 0.039 sq mi (0.1 km^{2})

Population (2020)
  - Total: 899
  - Density: 201/sq mi (77.5/km^{2})
- Time zone: UTC−5 (Eastern (EST))
  - Summer (DST): UTC−4 (EDT)
- ZIP code: 23063
- FIPS code: 51-31808
- GNIS feature ID: 1498483

Goochland is a census-designated place (CDP) in and the county seat of Goochland County, Virginia, United States. The population as of the 2020 census was 899, up from 861 in 2010. The community is also known as Goochland Courthouse or by an alternative spelling, Goochland Court House. It derives its name from the fact that the community is the location of the county's court house, while the county in turn is named for Sir William Gooch, 1st Baronet, the royal lieutenant governor of Virginia from 1727 to 1749.

== Geography ==
Goochland is located just south of the center of Goochland County and just north of the James River. U.S. Route 522 passes through the center of the community, leading north 27 miles (43 km) to Mineral and south 10 miles (16 km) to its southern terminus at U.S. Route 60 near Powhatan. Virginia Route 6 follows US 522 through the center of Goochland, but leads east 29 miles (47 km) to Richmond and west 16 miles (26 km) to Columbia. Interstate 64 passes 7 miles (11 km) to the northeast of Goochland, with access from Exit 159 at Gum Spring (US 522) and from Exit 167 at Oilville.

According to the U.S. Census Bureau, the Goochland CDP has a total area of 4.5 square miles (11.7 km^{2}), of which 4.5 square miles (11.6 km^{2}) are land and 0.04 square miles (0.1 km^{2}), or 1.18%, are water.

== Demographics ==
Historical population
Census	Pop.	Note	%±
2020	899		—
U.S. Decennial Census; 2010 2020

Goochland was first listed as a census designated place in the 2010 U.S. census.

== Notable people ==
- Carl Gordon (1932–2010), actor best known for appearing on the Fox TV series Roc.
- John Hicks, catcher for MLB's Texas Rangers.
- Justin Verlander, Cy Young winning pitcher for MLB's Detroit Tigers and MLB's San Francisco Giants.
- Tevin Davis, actor best known for appearing on Season 46 of Survivor (American TV series).

== In popular culture ==
A fictionalized, larger version of Goochland is depicted in the "Escape from Goochland" episode of The Cleveland Show, as the home of Stoolbend's arch-rival high school.

Goochland is featured in Season 7 Episode 15 of the X-Files, in which the child of a local Christian family is miraculously cured of cancer.

Goochland is shown on a T-shirt worn by country musician Oliver Anthony in his video "Rich Men North of Richmond".

== See also ==
- List of census-designated places in Virginia
