= Henry Turpin =

African-American Virginia politician (1836–1908)

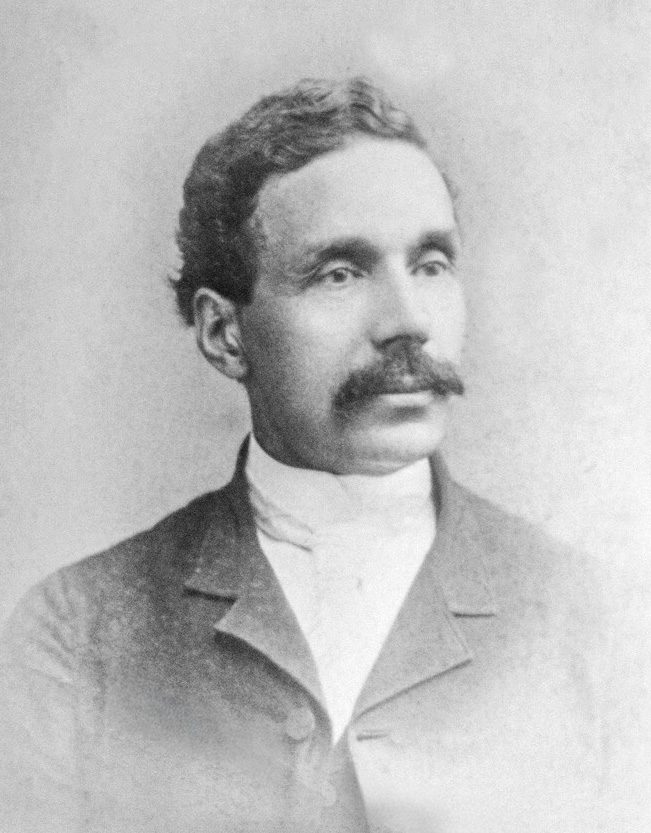
Portrait photograph of Henry Turpin (1836–1908), an African-American Republican politician who represented Goochland County in the Virginia House of Delegates during the Reconstruction era. The photograph dates from the late 19th century.

Henry Turpin (November 15, 1836 – September 7, 1908) was an American house painter and Republican politician who represented Goochland County in the Virginia House of Delegates during the Reconstruction era.

== Early life ==
Turpin was born into slavery in Goochland County, Virginia, the son of Mary James, an enslaved woman, and Edwin Turpin, a white planter. In 1857, his father emancipated him and most of his siblings by deed of manumission recorded in Goochland County.

== Trades and land ownership ==
Turpin learned carpentry and worked as a house painter. During the American Civil War, in November 1863, he purchased approximately 25 acres of land in Goochland County adjacent to his father’s property.

== Political career ==
In 1871, Turpin won election to the Virginia House of Delegates as a Republican, replacing a white Republican nominee and narrowly defeating a white Conservative Party candidate. Although Conservatives held a majority in the House of Delegates, Turpin was ultimately seated after the election was contested.

He served from 1871 to 1873. During his term, Turpin introduced an amendment to legislation providing artificial limbs to veterans, expanding eligibility to include “Colored men who lost legs as soldiers or employees in the late war,” thereby extending benefits to Black veterans and wartime laborers who had previously been excluded.

During the second session of the General Assembly, Turpin joined other Black and Republican delegates in opposing a proposal by white legislators to elect county judges, which they argued was unconstitutional. The Conservative majority refused to record the complaint in the legislative record.

Turpin attended the Republican State Convention of 1873 and was elected to the party’s state central committee. His bid for reelection later that year was again contested, and he ultimately lost his seat to Conservative candidate Edmund S. Pendleton.

== Later life ==
After leaving office, Turpin moved to the Bronx in New York City to live near his brother, Duroch Turpin, and other family members. He worked as a railroad porter, including employment as a sleeping car porter. Around 1886, he married Sarah J., a Virginia native; the couple had one child, who died before 1900.

Turpin died of heart disease at his home in the Bronx on September 7, 1908, and was buried at Woodlawn Cemetery.

== Legacy ==
Turpin is listed in historian Eric Foner’s Freedom’s Lawmakers: A Directory of Black Officeholders During Reconstruction, which documents African American legislators and public officials during the Reconstruction era.
