= Oliver Anthony =

American singer-songwriter (born 1992)

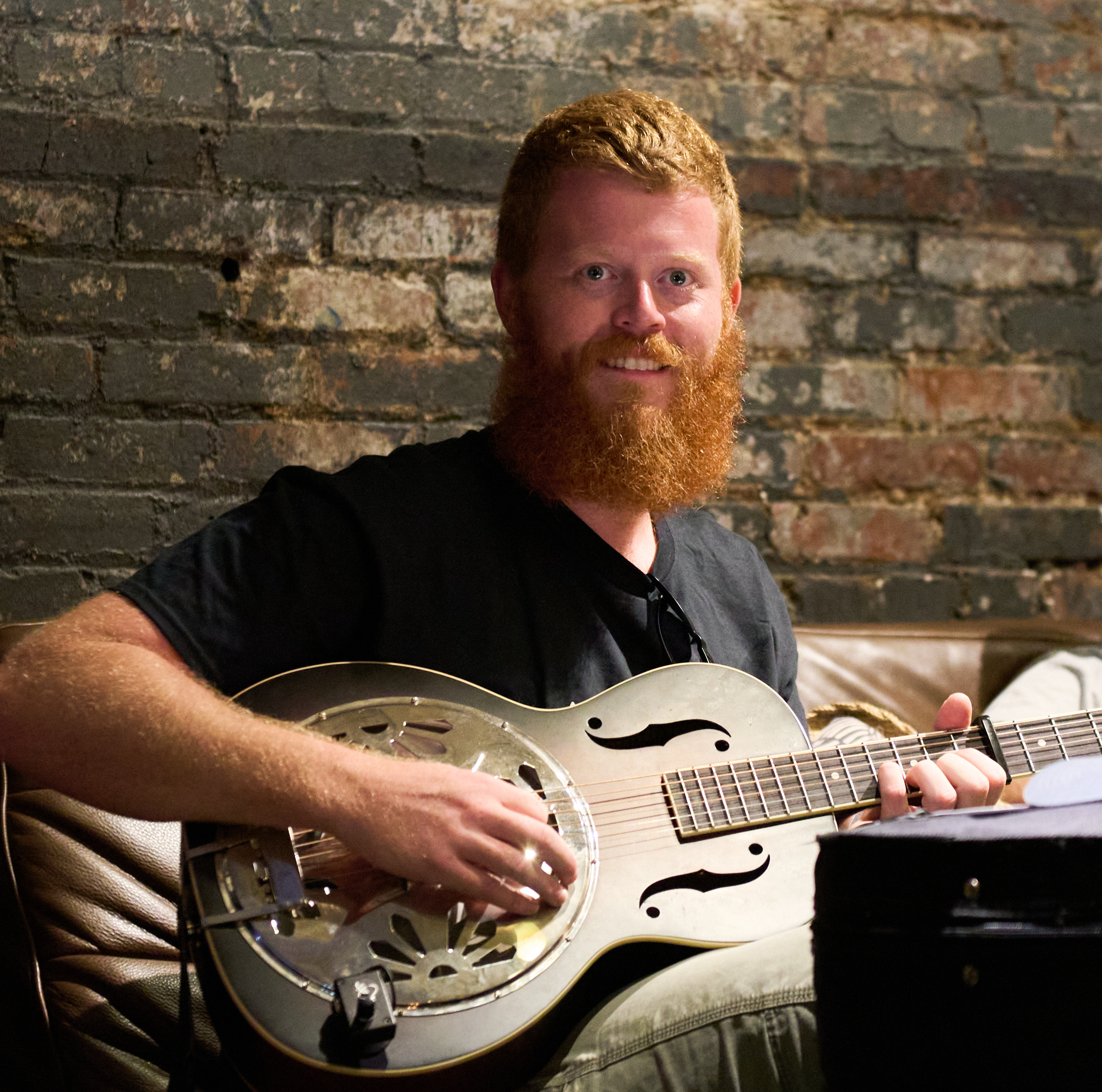
- Anthony in August 2023

Background information
- Born: Christopher Anthony Lunsford; June 30, 1992 (age 34)
- Origin: Farmville, Virginia, U.S.
- Genres: Country; folk
- Occupation: Singer-songwriter
- Instruments: Vocals; guitar
- Years active: 2021–present
- Website: oliveranthonymusic.com

Christopher Anthony Lunsford (born June 30, 1992), known professionally as Oliver Anthony, is an American singer-songwriter from Farmville, Virginia. In August 2023, he released the single "Rich Men North of Richmond" independently, which debuted atop the Billboard Hot 100 and made him the first artist to achieve this without any prior charting history in any form.

== Career ==
=== Career beginnings ===
A singer of the country-folk genre, Lunsford adopted his grandfather's name "Oliver Anthony" as his stage name in homage to the Depression era in which he lived.

Anthony started writing music in 2021, and since 2022 has released music as Oliver Anthony Music. Winston Marshall compared Anthony's performance on his song "Doggonit"—a song which contrasts consumption of insect protein and self-driving cars with Anthony's rural abode—to that of a character from Hillbilly Elegy. His music has been influenced by Hank Williams.

He said he "started getting messages from people saying how much the music was helping them with their struggles in their lives", and that that gave him a purpose. "It made me feel like I wasn't just wasting my time." Anthony had been struggling with mental health issues and alcohol abuse for five years, and according to Twitter user Jason Howerton who had interviewed him, in July 2023 Anthony broke down and promised God that he would get sober if he helped him follow his dream. Around 30 days later, West Virginia music channel Radiowv asked him to record a song for its YouTube music channel, and the result was "Rich Men North of Richmond".

Anthony performed a free show at a farmers' market in Barco, North Carolina, on August 13, which Anthony opened with the reading of verses from Psalm 37 about evildoers. He was joined by surprise guest Jamey Johnson. That same month, six other Anthony songs ranked in the iTunes top 20, with five of the others in the top 10, including "I've Got to Get Sober", which reached No. 3 on the Apple platform.

"Aint Gotta Dollar", a song about self-reliance without spending money, and ranked Anthony's fourth best by Taste of Country, reached number 1 on the Viral 50 list in Spotify and No. 2 on iTunes. Anthony said that members of the public had reached out to tell him that the song had connected with them powerfully.

In a Facebook post on August 17, Anthony described what he believes to be the reasons for his popularity: "I wrote the music I wrote because I was suffering with mental health and depression. These songs have connected with millions of people on such a deep level because they're being sung by someone feeling the words in the very moment they were being sung. No editing, no agent, no bullshit. Just some idiot and his guitar."

Anthony's second documented public concert, in Moyock, North Carolina, opened in what Billboard described as "a unique fashion", with him reading a passage from the Bible.

=== "Rich Men North of Richmond" ===
The video of Anthony performing "Rich Men North of Richmond" was uploaded to YouTube on August 8, 2023, and immediately went viral. Billboard described it as taking on "politicians, taxes, welfare and other issues from a struggling working man's perspective", and various news sources described themes in it as anti-establishment, conservative, or conspiratorial. It was further promoted by personalities including singer-songwriter John Rich, podcaster Joe Rogan, and conservative commentators Jack Posobiec and Matt Walsh.

The song went to number 1 on the U.S. iTunes all-genres chart within days, and to number 1 on the Spotify U.S. and Apple Music charts a few days later. Virginia Attorney General Jason Miyares called Anthony's performance "unreal Virginia talent." NBC News reported on August 14 that the original video upload had over nine million views in the space of five days, and noted a comment on it which had attracted 11,000 likes: "And just like that you became the voice of 40 or 50 million working men."

=== Later output ===
All songs Anthony published before "Rich Men North of Richmond" were recorded on his mobile phone. Within days of the song's release, John Rich publicly offered to produce Anthony's first album. On August 16, Billboard talked of a music industry "feeding frenzy" for his signature, reporting that one label head had told them, "I don't think I've ever seen anything like this before." Anthony wrote on his Facebook page on the same day that "Everyone in the 'industry' is rushing me into signing something, but we just want to take things slow right now." He also wrote that "We are working on a full line up of shows" with space for bigger audiences.

On August 17, Anthony wrote, "People in the music industry give me blank stares when I brush off 8 million dollar offers. I don't want 6 tour buses, 15 tractor trailers and a jet. I don't want to play stadium shows, I don't want to be in the spotlight."

Draven Riffe of Radiowv told Billboard in an interview published August 19 that he is Anthony's co-manager, together with Brian Prentice. He said that five more acoustic songs had been recorded at Anthony's farm at the same sessions as "Rich Men", to be released soon. There were also concert bookings until the end of 2023, he said.

On August 22, Anthony released a new music video for "I Want to Go Home" via YouTube. Views exceeded one million in 24 hours; It was followed on September 2 by a video for his song "90 Some Chevy", a song initially released in April that compares certain aspects of romantic love to an older vehicle. A live recording of the same song was also released, with 1.3 million views of the video in two days." "I Want to Go Home" was the 39th most-downloaded song of 2023 in the United States, above "All I Want For Christmas is You" by Mariah Carey, "What Was I Made For?" by Billie Eilish, and "Kill Bill" by SZA.

On March 29, 2024, Anthony announced his debut studio album Hymnal of a Troubled Man's Mind, which was released on March 31.

== Firsts ==
In addition to being the first songwriter to debut at the top of the Billboard Hot 100 with no prior chart history in any form, Anthony is the first male songwriter to chart 13 songs simultaneously in the top 50 Digital Song Sales while still alive—Prince and Michael Jackson exceeded that count only following their deaths.

Industry observers noted these milestones were reached despite virtually no radio play; nonetheless, when country music stations such as WGH-FM in Virginia and KBAY in California started playing Anthony, he debuted a few days later at No. 45 on the Country Airplay list.

== Artistry ==
Anthony plays the resonator guitar, and is said to have a "raspy" or "distinct, gravelly voice and heavy twang"; Don Cusic described Anthony's style as straining and sincere, with "a voice that just cuts through."

== Personal life ==
Anthony was born and raised in the Piedmont area of Virginia and currently resides in Farmville, Virginia. As of August 2023, he lived with his wife and two children in a $750 camper on an off-the-grid 90-acre property, where he said he intends to raise livestock. After his fame, his wife divorced him; Anthony subsequently wrote a song about her seeking half of his assets.

Anthony dropped out of high school in 2010 at the age of 17, and later received a General Educational Development diploma; he went on to work in industrial jobs in North Carolina and Virginia. At a paper mill in North Carolina, he had a work accident in 2013 which fractured his skull, leaving him unable to work for half a year. He wrote in a Facebook post that from 2014 through 2023 he worked in outside sales in manufacturing, visiting factories and job sites.

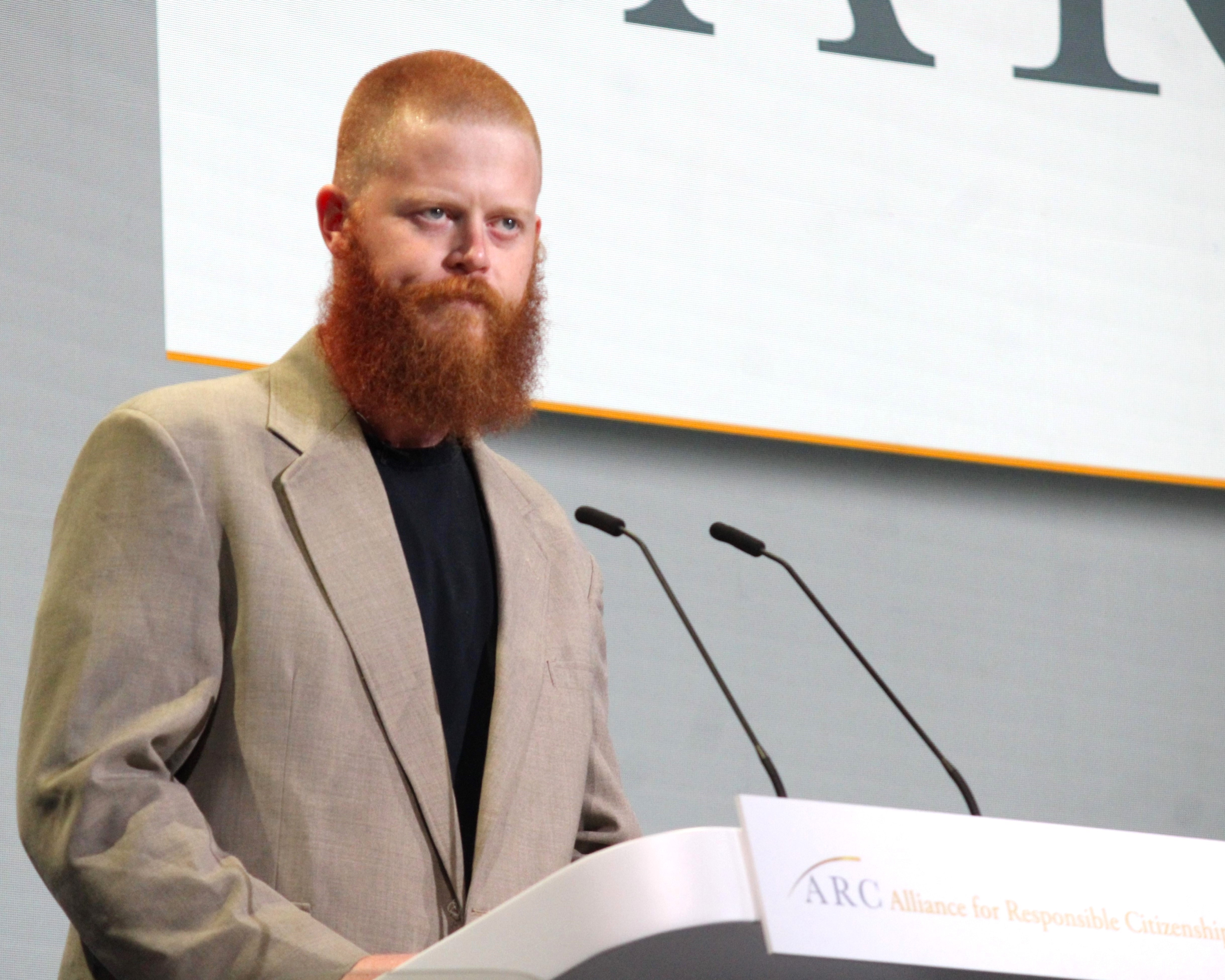
Anthony speaking at the Alliance for Responsible Citizenship, London, 2025

Anthony said in a video in August 2023 that he is nonpartisan: "I sit pretty dead center down the aisle on politics and always have." Later that month, he said he was bothered by others who "wrap politics" around his work. "I see the right trying to characterize me as one of their own, and I see the left trying to discredit me, I guess in retaliation. That shit's got to stop", he said.

In February 2025, Anthony spoke and performed at the 2025 conference of the Alliance for Responsible Citizenship, an international conservative organization affiliated with psychologist and political commentator Jordan Peterson. Anthony's speech featured religious themes and criticized the influence of social media on human life, as well as promoting his activism to revive rural America.

== Discography ==
=== Studio albums ===
List of studio album, with selected details and chart positions
Title	Details	Peaks
Title	Details	US Heat.
Hymnal of a Troubled Man's Mind	Released: March 31, 2024; Label: Self-released; Formats: Digital download, streaming, CD, Vinyl	13

=== Singles ===
List of singles, with selected chart positions, showing year released, certifications and album names
Title	Year (Note: Indicates year of release. Anthony's first song to chart was "Rich Men North of Richmond", after which songs he released earlier charted.)	Peak chart positions										Certifications	Album
Title	Year	US	US Cou.	US Cou. Air.	AUS	CAN	IRE	NZ	SWE	UK	WW	Certifications	Album
"Aint Gotta Dollar"	2022	82	21	—	—	— (Note: "Aint Gotta Dollar" did not enter the Billboard Canadian Hot 100, but peaked at number 8 on the Canadian Digital Song Sales chart.)	—	—	—	—	—		Non-album single
"Rich Man's Gold"	2022	— (Note: "Rich Man's Gold" did not enter the Billboard Hot 100, but peaked at number 15 on the Digital Song Sales chart.)	— (Note: "Rich Man's Gold" did not enter the Hot Country Songs chart, but peaked at number 10 on the Country Digital Song Sales chart.)	—	—	— (Note: "Rich Man's Gold" did not enter the Billboard Canadian Hot 100, but peaked at number 49 on the Canadian Digital Song Sales chart.)	—	—	—	—	—		Hymnal of a Troubled Man's Mind
"Cobwebs and Cocaine"	2022	—	—	—	—	—	—	—	—	—	—		Hymnal of a Troubled Man's Mind
"Virginia"	2022	— (Note: "Virginia" did not enter the Billboard Hot 100, but peaked at number 11 on the Digital Song Sales chart.)	— (Note: "Virginia" did not enter the Hot Country Songs chart, but peaked at number 7 on the Country Digital Song Sales chart.)	—	—	— (Note: "Virginia" did not enter the Billboard Canadian Hot 100, but peaked at number 35 on the Canadian Digital Song Sales chart.)	—	—	—	—	—		Non-album single
"Hell on Earth"	2023	— (Note: "Hell on Earth" did not enter the Billboard Hot 100, but peaked at number 37 on the Digital Song Sales chart.)	— (Note: "Hell on Earth" did not enter the Hot Country Songs chart, but peaked at number 21 on the Country Digital Song Sales chart.)	—	—	—	—	—	—	—	—		Hymnal of a Troubled Man's Mind
"Between You & Me"	2023	— (Note: "Between You & Me" did not enter the Billboard Hot 100, but peaked at number 43 on the Digital Song Sales chart.)	— (Note: "Between You & Me" did not enter the Hot Country Songs chart, but peaked at number 25 on the Country Digital Song Sales chart.)	—	—	—	—	—	—	—	—		Non-album single
"Feeling Purdy Good"	2023	— (Note: "Feeling Purdy Good" did not enter the Billboard Hot 100, but peaked at number 21 on the Digital Song Sales chart.)	— (Note: "Feeling Purdy Good" did not enter the Hot Country Songs chart, but peaked at number 14 on the Country Digital Song Sales chart.)	—	—	—	—	—	—	—	—		Hymnal of a Troubled Man's Mind
"I Want to Go Home"	2023	— (Note: "I Want to Go Home" did not enter the Billboard Hot 100, but peaked at number 1 on the Bubbling Under Hot 100 Singles chart.)	27	—	—	— (Note: "I Want to Go Home" did not enter the Billboard Canadian Hot 100, but peaked at number 5 on the Canadian Digital Song Sales chart.)	—	—	—	— (Note: "I Want to Go Home" did not enter the UK Singles Chart, but peaked at number 43 on the Singles Sales Chart.)	—		Hymnal of a Troubled Man's Mind
"Always Love You (Like a Good Ole Dog)"	2023	— (Note: "Always Love You (Like a Good Ole Dog)" did not enter the Billboard Hot 100, but peaked at number 19 on the Digital Song Sales chart.)	— (Note: "Always Love You (Like a Good Ole Dog)" did not enter the Hot Country Songs chart, but peaked at number 12 on the Country Digital Song Sales chart.)	—	—	—	—	—	—	—	—		Hymnal of a Troubled Man's Mind
"Doggonit"	2023	— (Note: "Doggonit" did not enter the Billboard Hot 100, but peaked at number 23 on the Digital Song Sales chart.)	— (Note: "Doggonit" did not enter the Hot Country Songs chart, but peaked at number 16 on the Country Digital Song Sales chart.)	—	—	—	—	—	—	—	—		Hymnal of a Troubled Man's Mind
"Stuck Living in the New World"	2023	— (Note: "Stuck Living in the New World" did not enter the Billboard Hot 100, but peaked at number 24 on the Digital Song Sales chart.)	— (Note: "Stuck Living in the New World" did not enter the Hot Country Songs chart, but peaked at number 17 on the Country Digital Song Sales chart.)	—	—	—	—	—	—	—	—		Non-album singles
"Long Gone"	2023	—	—	—	—	—	—	—	—	—	—		Non-album singles
"VCR Kid"	2023	—	—	—	—	—	—	—	—	—	—		Hymnal of a Troubled Man's Mind
"90 Some Chevy"	2023	— (Note: "90 Some Chevy" did not enter the Billboard Hot 100, but peaked at number 29 on the Digital Song Sales chart.)	— (Note: "90 Some Chevy" did not enter the Hot Country Songs chart, but peaked at number 21 on the Country Digital Song Sales chart.)	—	—	—	—	—	—	—	—		Non-album single
"I've Got to Get Sober"	2023	— (Note: "I've Got to Get Sober" did not enter the Billboard Hot 100, but peaked at number 22 on the Bubbling Under Hot 100 Singles chart.)	35	—	—	— (Note: "I've Got to Get Sober" did not enter the Billboard Canadian Hot 100, but peaked at number 16 on the Canadian Digital Song Sales chart.)	—	—	—	—	—		Hymnal of a Troubled Man's Mind
"Rich Men North of Richmond"	2023	1	1	40	14	3	10	14	26	23	2	BPI: Silver; RMNZ: Platinum	Non-album single
"Cowboys and Sunsets"	2024	—	—	—	—	—	—	—	—	—	—		TBA
"Scornful Woman"	2025	— (Note: "Scornful Woman" did not enter the Billboard Hot 100, but peaked at number 2 on the Bubbling Under Hot 100 chart.)	37	—	—	89	—	— (Note: "Scornful Woman" did not enter the NZ Top 40 Singles Chart, but peaked at number 24 on the NZ Hot Singles Chart.)	—	— (Note: "Scornful Woman" did not enter the UK Singles Chart, but peaked at number 95 on the Singles Sales Chart.)	—		TBA
"—" denotes releases that did not chart or were not released in that region.
