= Zachariah Eastin =

- Born: January 17, 1777; Goochland County, Virginia
- Died: January 14, 1852 (aged 74); Henderson, Kentucky
- Occupation: Military Officer
- Known for: Military service in the War of 1812
- Title: Brigadier-General
- Spouse: Nancy A Durbin
- Children: Mary F., Henry J., Louisa A. (Stubblefield), Edward F., Cassandra M. (Rankin), Robert, Thomas, and William A.
- Parent(s): Augustine Eastin and Mary S. Ford

Zachariah Eastin (January 17, 1777 – January 14, 1852) was an officer in the War of 1812. He fought at the battles of Tippecanoe, River Raisin, and the Thames. He retired from the Army as a Brigadier-General.

== Family ==
Eastin was born January 17, 1777, in Goochland County, Virginia. He was the second son of Augustine Eastin and Mary S. Ford. He married Nancy A Durbin on October 25, 1798. They had eight children: Mary F., Henry J., Louisa A. (Stubblefield), Edward F., Cassandra M. (Rankin), Robert, Thomas and William A.. He died on January 14, 1852, in Henderson, Kentucky.

Zachariah Eastin's father, Augustine Eastin, was a Baptist preacher. He was convicted and jailed in Richmond, Virginia, for preaching to British soldiers. He was threatened with being shot if he persisted. Zachariah was seven when his family moved to Bourbon County, Kentucky. This was during the time Boonesborough and Bryant's Station were established. In 1792 Augustine participated in a committee that was in charge of enabling Kentucky to separate from Virginia. Augustine and his other committee members, James Garrard and Ambrose Dudley, reported to the Elkhorn Baptist Association in favor of forbidding slavery in the Kentucky Constitution under development for the new state. Slavery was the major issue discussed at the 1792 drafting convention.

Zachariah’s sons, Henry J. Eastin, Robert Eastin, Thomas Eastin, and William A. Eastin all became civil engineers. Henry J Eastin was one of the first engineers to be employed by the State of Kentucky during the period of internal improvements. The other sons constructed other things around Kentucky such as: a saw and grist water mill through the use of a Dam on the Green River, at Spottsville, Kentucky.(5)

== Military service ==
Zachariah served with distinction during the War of 1812 and Tecumseh's War against the Shawnee. He was commissioned by Governor Isaac Shelby, and W. D. Mardin, Sec. on September 10, 1813, and was appointed Major of the 2nd Battalion, 4th Regiment, Kentucky Volunteers. He served under William Henry Harrison and throughout the campaigns he served with Generals Issac Shelby, Thomas Metcalfe, Joseph Desha and Colonel Richard M. Johnson, all through his campaigns in the West and fought at Tippecanoe and River Basin. He served as captain at the battle of Tippecanoe on November 7, 1811, and as a Major at the battle of the Thames, late in 1813. Before the end of the war he was promoted to Colonel. Captains Bowen, Cox, Negley and John Baskett, from Kentucky, served as officers with him. He remained in the army after the War of 1812 and was promoted to brigadier-general from that time until 1824, when he resigned after a misunderstanding with General Desha.

He retired to Henderson, Kentucky, in 1843, where he lived until his death on January 14, 1852.
