= Rich Men North of Richmond =

2023 single by Oliver Anthony

Single by Oliver Anthony
- Released: August 8, 2023
- Genre: Country; folk
- Length: 3:07
- Label: Self-released
- Songwriter: Oliver Anthony
- Producer: Oliver Anthony

Oliver Anthony singles chronology
"I've Got to Get Sober" (2023)	"Rich Men North of Richmond" (2023)	"Cowboys and Sunsets" (2024)

Music video
- "Rich Men North of Richmond" on YouTube

"Rich Men North of Richmond" is a song by American singer-songwriter Oliver Anthony that was released in August 2023. The song became an overnight viral hit after gaining traction on social media. Within days of its release, it topped sales and streaming charts, and then debuted at number 1 on the Billboard Hot 100, making Anthony the first artist to debut atop the chart without any prior chart history in any form. The song received praise from some conservatives and was discussed at a Republican presidential debate; in response, Anthony rejected attempts to "try to stick [him] in a political bucket" and described the song as a criticism of politicians in both the Democratic and Republican parties.

== Lyrics and composition ==
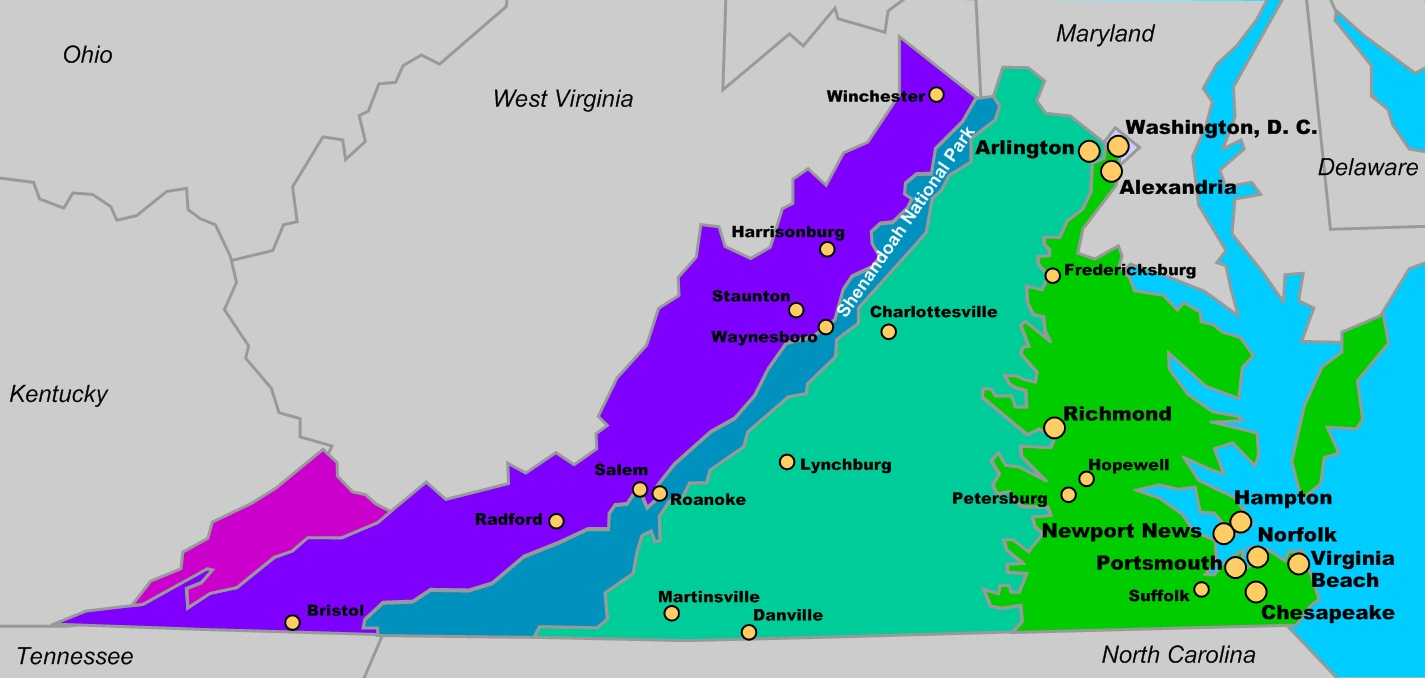
Map of Virginia; the United States capital Washington, D.C. is 108 miles north of the state capital Richmond.

The song is a little over three minutes with a tempo of 118 beats per minute and is in the key of G minor. It has a verse-chorus form with a pre-chorus and a turnaround. Unlike most other hits, however, it has an outro without an intro. Overall, its song structure is similar to other contemporary hits.

The song's lyrics include common right-wing talking points. Its themes include low wages ("for bullshit pay"), food poverty ("nothing to eat"), high inflation ("dollar ain't shit"), high taxes ("taxed to no end"), Jeffrey Epstein's political affiliations ("minors on an island"), welfare abuse ("the obese milkin' welfare"), and centralization of power ("wanna have total control").

In a video explaining his songwriting, Anthony said that his lyrics attempt to speak for the working class and that he aspires to be a "voice for those people", noting that "whatever it is they're doing, they can't quite get ahead". The lyrics have been compared to "Brother, Can You Spare a Dime?"

== Production ==
Completed less than four hours before recording, the song had stood half-written two days before. There was just one instrument – an acoustic resonator guitar. The recording was quite raw and unpolished, with background noise and clipping, but this helped to give it an authentic, emotional quality.

The song was first uploaded to YouTube on August 8, 2023, by Radiowv, and the video received over 5 million views in its first three days. Prior to the song's success, Anthony was not a well-known musician, and he had previously self-recorded songs on his cell phone. "Rich Men North of Richmond" was Anthony's first professionally recorded song.

== Reception ==
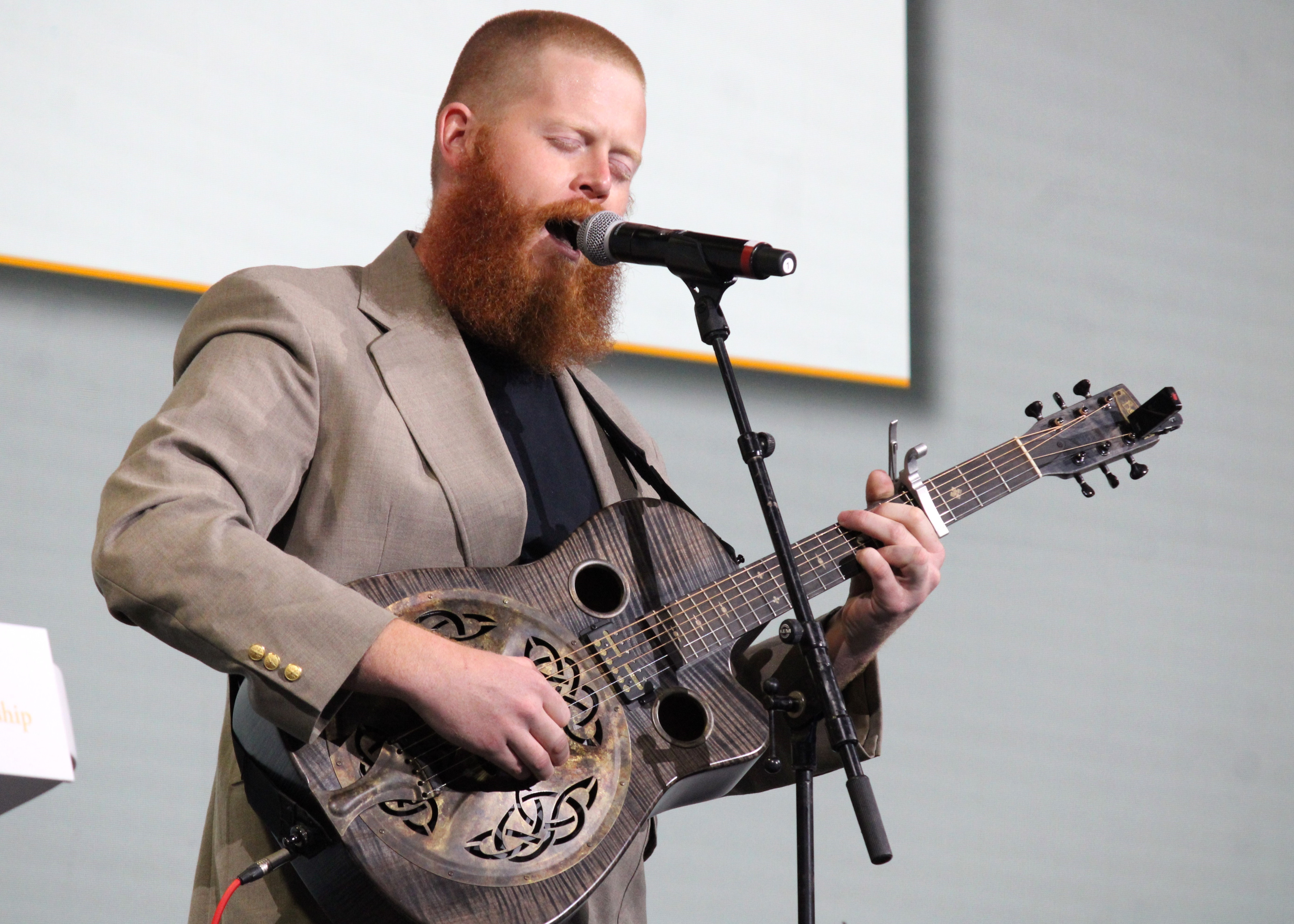
Anthony performing the song at the Alliance for Responsible Citizenship held at the Millennium Dome in London, February 2025

The song has been attributed to a diverse range of influences, and various commentators have described it as an "anthem" for the "everyman", for blue-collar workers, as well as for conservatives, and the right-wing, the latter of which Anthony has rejected. The song was praised by Republican House representative Marjorie Taylor Greene, country singer John Rich, podcaster Joe Rogan, and conservative commentators Dan Bongino and Matt Walsh. Musician and commentator Winston Marshall praised the song in an op-ed for The Spectator as a "raw original tune ... that decries the powers that be in DC, elite pedophiles and the plight of ordinary working Americans" which "has resonated like a National guitar with music-loving Americans starved for something authentic". Not all who championed the song were from the right; Democratic senator Chris Murphy posted that "progressives should listen to this", with the suggestion that the issues raised in the song are "all problems the left has better solutions to than the right". In contrast, conservative National Review's executive editor Mark Antonio Wright criticized the song's lyrics, arguing that "if you're a fit, able-bodied man, and you're working 'overtime hours for bullshit pay,' you need to find a new job."

Describing the song as "a passionate screed against the state of the country", Rolling Stone writer Joseph Hudak also said that Anthony delves into "Reagan-era talking points about welfare". Jay Caspian Kang wrote in The New Yorker that "depending on your politics, [Anthony] is either a voice sent from Heaven to express the anger of the white working class, or he is a wholly constructed viral creation who has arrived to serve up resentment with a thick, folksy lacquering of Americana." In an interview with Billboard, Radiowv's Draven Riffe said: "We both prayed before we recorded Rich Men North of Richmond." "In our opinion, God has chosen to speak through Oliver and to speak to all Americans through his music, all around the world," he said.

The song was likened to "Try That in a Small Town" by Jason Aldean, a country song popular among conservatives. Emma Keates wrote in The A.V. Club that Anthony's lyrics are "not ... as blatantly threatening" as those in Aldean's single, but "they're generally still based on a number of regressive and gross stereotypes that are filtering into mainstream music in a frightening way". Some criticized the song for its line about "the obese milkin' welfare", claiming that it draws on negative stereotypes about welfare recipients.

The song is described as the "latest in a series of controversial cultural flashpoints" that divided America. In The Washington Post, it is argued that coming after the film Sound of Freedom and Jason Aldean's "Try That in a Small Town", the song is significant in demonstrating that "the far-right is gaining ground in the world of pop culture" previously dominated by "leftist personalities and values". An alternative view, posited in Australian news outlet news.com.au, is that "no matter where you go and who you impress, there will always be a group of people eager" to "misconstrue your message," and so, although the song is "clearly about a working class call to arms, there were some who viewed the song as an 'offensive right wing anthem'".

The song also received a response from British singer Billy Bragg, who wrote a song titled "Rich Men Earning North of a Million" with lyrics encouraging labor organization.

=== In politics ===
The song was referenced in the first question of the first Republican presidential debate in Milwaukee on August 23, 2023, hosted by Fox News. The question, by Martha MacCallum, was directed to Governor of Florida Ron DeSantis: "Why is this song striking such a nerve in this country right now?" DeSantis responded that the country is "in decline" but that the decline is "not inevitable" and that "those rich men north of Richmond have put us in this situation." Fox News said they had contacted Anthony prior to the debate and received permission to play the song.

A reference to politicians "looking out for minors on an island somewhere" has been interpreted as a reference to Jeffrey Epstein and his private island Little Saint James, and has led to speculation that Anthony was referencing the QAnon conspiracy theory, which revolves around the belief that politicians and other elites engage in child sex trafficking and other child abuse. The song was played during the Donald Trump town hall in Oaks, Pennsylvania, in October 2024.

=== Anthony's response ===
On August 25, Anthony released a video statement on YouTube. On the Republican presidential debate, he said: "It was funny seeing my song at the presidential debate, because I wrote that song about those people, you know. ... That song is written about the people on that stage—and a lot more, too. Not just them, but definitely them." He clarified that he does not support President Joe Biden, either.

Anthony said that his song has been "weaponized" by the right and the left: "I see the right trying to characterise me as one of their own. And I see the left trying to discredit me, I guess in retaliation." He said the people he wrote about in the song have "done everything they can in the last two weeks to make me look like a fool, to spin my words, to try to stick me in a political bucket." He also addressed those who interpreted the song as "an attack against the poor", saying that "all of my songs that reference class defend the poor". He said of "Rich Men": "30-some million people understood what I was saying, but it only takes a few to try to derail the train, to try to send out false narratives."

== Commercial performance ==
"Rich Men North of Richmond" debuted at number one on the Billboard Hot 100 dated August 26, 2023, with 147,000 downloads and 17.5 million streams that week. It made Anthony the first artist to debut a song at number one on that chart with no prior entries in any form (five other solo artists debuted at No. 1 but had prior entries in some forms; for example, Baauer's song "Harlem Shake" first appeared in the dance/electronic chart before it reached the Hot 100). It also makes him the third unsigned artist to have a number-one single on that chart, following Lisa Loeb's "Stay (I Missed You)" in 1994 and Macklemore & Ryan Lewis' "Can't Hold Us" and "Thrift Shop" in 2013. The song is also the first by a solo male artist to reach No. 1 on both the Hot 100 and Hot Country Songs simultaneously in its debut week.

The song stayed at number one on the Hot 100, Hot Country Songs, and Digital Songs charts for a second week, with downloads dropping 20% to 117,000, while streaming went up 31% to 22.9 million. Airplay increased by 310% to 2.3 million audience impressions despite the song not being promoted to radio.

== Charts ==
=== Weekly charts ===
Weekly chart performance for "Rich Men North of Richmond"
Chart (2023–2024)	Peak position
Australia (ARIA)	14
Canada Hot 100 (Billboard)	3
Global 200 (Billboard)	2
Ireland (IRMA)	10
Netherlands (Global Top 40)	11
New Zealand (Recorded Music NZ)	14
Sweden (Sverigetopplistan)	26
UK Singles (Official Charts)	23
UK Independent (Official Charts)	5
US Billboard Hot 100	1
US Country Airplay (Billboard)	40
US Hot Country Songs (Billboard)	1

=== Year-end charts ===
2023 year-end chart performance for "Rich Men North of Richmond"
Chart (2023)	Position
Canada (Canadian Hot 100)	70
US Billboard Hot 100	78
US Hot Country Songs (Billboard)	26

2024 year-end chart performance for "Rich Men North of Richmond"
Chart (2024)	Position
US Hot Country Songs (Billboard)	71

== Certifications ==
Region	Certification	Certified units/sales
New Zealand (RMNZ)	Platinum	30,000^{‡}
United Kingdom (BPI)	Silver	200,000^{‡}
^{‡} Sales+streaming figures based on certification alone.
