= Thomas Bryan Martin =

American politician (1731–1798)

Member of the House of Burgesses from Hampshire County
- In office 1756–1758 Serving with Thomas Walker
- Preceded by: Gabriel Jones; Thomas Walker
- Succeeded by: Gabriel Jones; Mr. Parker

Member of the House of Burgesses from Frederick County
- In office 1758–1761 Serving with George Washington
- Preceded by: Thomas Swearingen; Hugh West
- Succeeded by: George Mercer

Personal details
- Born: 11 April 1731 Kent, England
- Died: 23 September 1798 (aged 67) Virginia
- Relations: Denny Martin (father); Frances Fairfax Martin (mother); Denny Martin Fairfax (brother); Thomas Fairfax, 6th Lord Fairfax of Cameron (uncle); Robert Fairfax, 7th Lord Fairfax of Cameron (uncle); Thomas Fairfax, 5th Lord Fairfax of Cameron (grandfather); Thomas Colepeper, 2nd Baron Colepeper (great-grandfather)
- Occupation: land agent; justice; legislator; planter

Military service
- Rank: Colonel
- Commands: Frederick County militia

Thomas Bryan Martin (April 11, 1731 – September 23, 1798) was an English-born American land agent, legislator and planter in the colony (and later U.S. state) of Virginia and in present-day West Virginia. Martin was the land agent of the Northern Neck Proprietary for his uncle Thomas Fairfax, 6th Lord Fairfax of Cameron (1693–1781) and served two terms in the House of Burgesses.

Martin was born in Kent in 1731, and was the grandson of Thomas Fairfax, 5th Lord Fairfax of Cameron (1657–1710) through his mother, Frances Fairfax Martin. Raised in humble surroundings in England, Martin relocated to Virginia in 1751 to assist his uncle, Thomas Fairfax, 6th Lord Fairfax of Cameron (known as Lord Fairfax), in administering the Northern Neck Proprietary, which encompassed up to 5,000,000 acres (20,000 km^{2}). Martin resided with his uncle on their frontier Greenway Court estate in present-day Clarke County, Virginia. He earned the affections of Lord Fairfax on account of his energetic nature and loyalty, and through Martin's growing influence Lord Fairfax relocated the proprietary's base of operations to Greenway Court in 1762 and made Martin steward and land agent of the proprietary.

Martin took an active role in political and civil affairs within the proprietary's domain. He served as a vestryman for the Anglican Frederick Parish, and upon the creation of Hampshire County in 1754, he presided as the county's first justice and was further appointed the County Lieutenant. He later represented Hampshire County in the House of Burgesses from 1756 to 1758 and serving with George Washington, represented Frederick County from 1758 until 1761. Martin was appointed a trustee of the frontier towns of Winchester, Stephensburg (present-day Stephens City), and Bath (present-day Berkeley Springs). He was also appointed as the colonel of the Frederick County militia. Though not in the best of health, Martin was relied upon by the settlers of the proprietary to use his considerable resources in response to Native American attacks. Following the outbreak of the American Revolutionary War, Martin refused reappointment by Governor Patrick Henry as a justice of the Frederick County Commission of Peace. Afterward, Martin retreated from civil service entirely, and retired to Greenway Court.

He maintained a low profile during the war, and his uncle Lord Fairfax was treated with respect and consideration despite being the only resident peer in the American colonies. Following the death of Lord Fairfax in 1781, Martin's brother Reverend Denny Martin Fairfax inherited the Northern Neck Proprietary, and Martin was given the Greenway Court estate. He took his uncle's housekeeper Mrs. Crawford as his mistress and died unmarried in 1798. Martin bequeathed his Greenway Court estate and an adjoining 1,000 acres (4.0 km^{2}) to his housekeeper Betsy Powers. Martin's brother Denny Fairfax was unable to properly maintain the proprietary and conveyed the remaining lands in 1797, thus terminating the Fairfax and Martin families' interests in the proprietary before it was formally dissolved in 1806. The city of Martinsburg, West Virginia, was named for Martin by his friend Adam Stephen.

== Early life and family ==
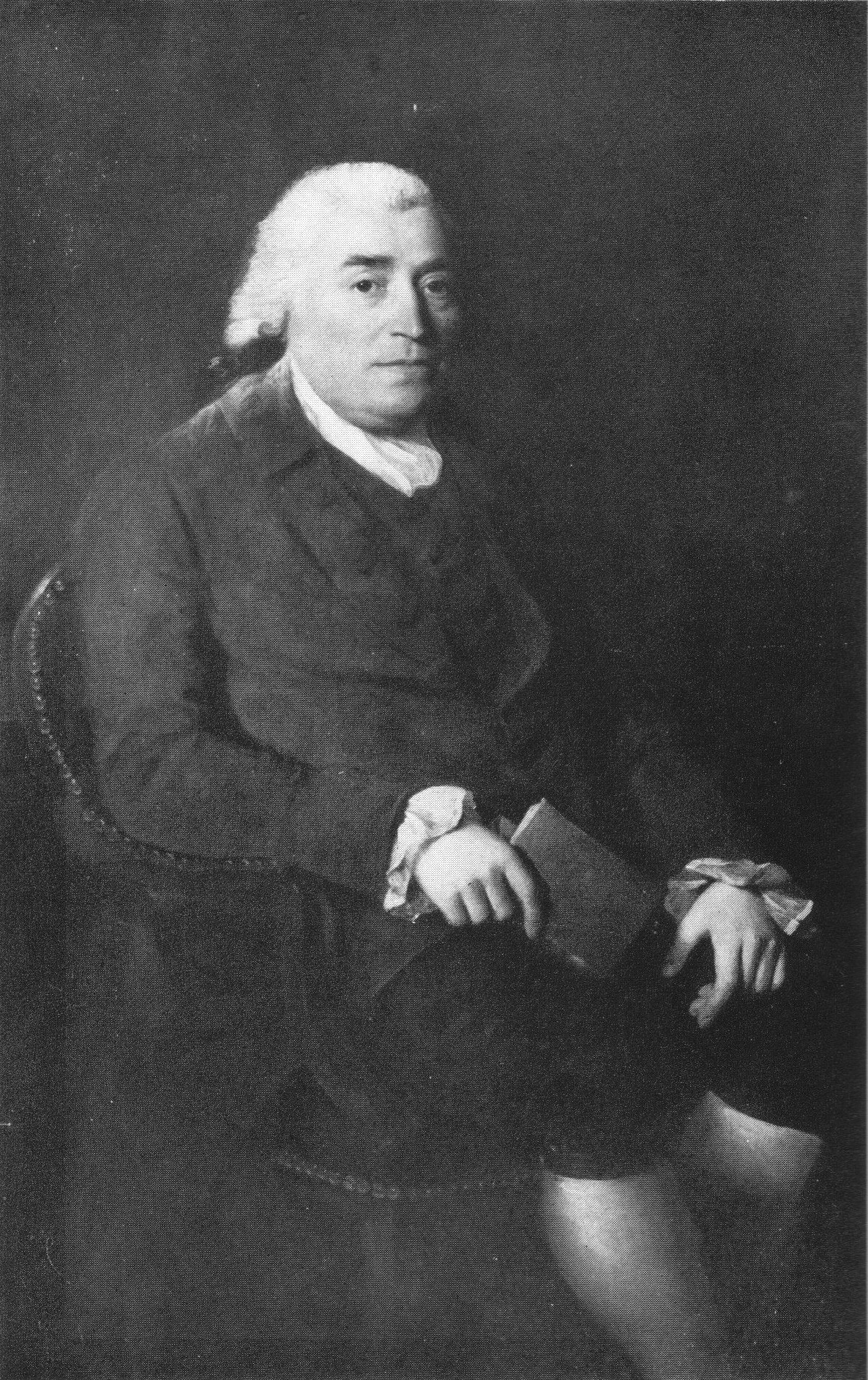
Thomas Fairfax, 6th Lord Fairfax of Cameron

Thomas Bryan Martin was born in Kent, England, in 1731 and was the son of Denny Martin (1695–1762) of Salts Manor and his wife Frances Fairfax Martin (1703–1791). His father and mother married in Loose, Kent. Martin's mother was the daughter of Thomas Fairfax, 5th Lord Fairfax of Cameron (1657–1710) and his wife Catherine Colepeper Fairfax, and thus a sister of Thomas Fairfax, 6th Lord Fairfax of Cameron (1693–1781) and Robert Fairfax, 7th Lord Fairfax of Cameron (1707–1793). His grandmother Catherine Colepeper Fairfax was the daughter of Thomas Colepeper, 2nd Baron Colepeper and his wife Margaretta van Hesse, who was from a Dutch noble family. Martin was named in honor of his uncle Thomas. He was baptized into the Anglican faith as "Thomas Brian" in Loose on April 11, 1731. Martin and his siblings were raised amid humble surroundings in England. He had seven siblings, including four brothers and three sisters:

- Edward Martin (1723–1775)
- John Martin (1724–1746)
- Reverend Denny Martin (later Fairfax, 1725–1800)
- Frances Martin (1727–1813)
- Sibylla Martin (1729–1816)
- Philip Martin (1733–1821)
- Anna Susanna Martin (1736–1817)

== Northern Neck Proprietary administration ==
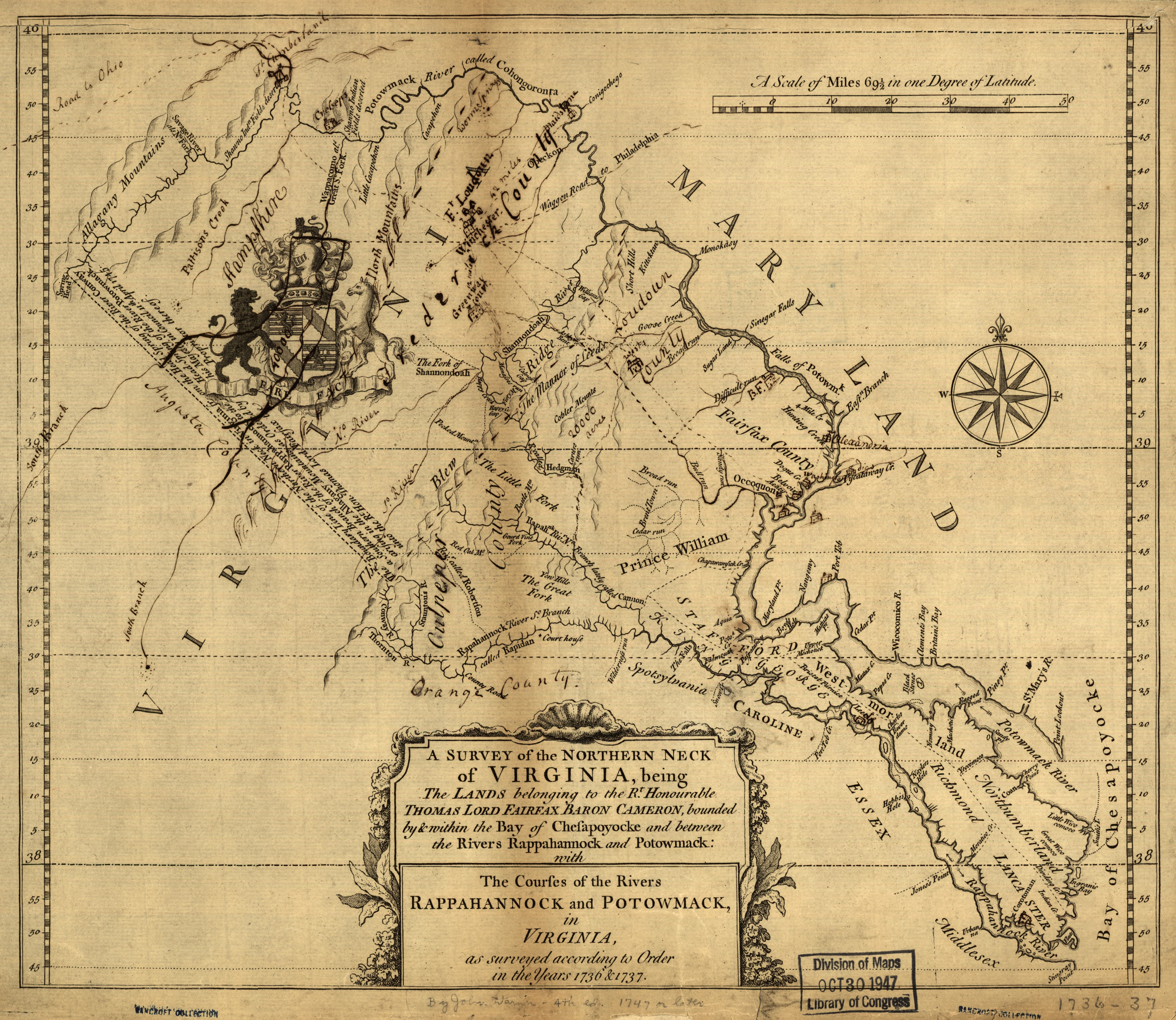
Map of the Northern Neck Proprietary, 1736–37

Martin's uncle Thomas Fairfax, 6th Lord Fairfax of Cameron (known as Lord Fairfax) owned the Northern Neck Proprietary land grant, which he had inherited from Martin's great-grandfather Thomas Colepeper, 2nd Baron Colepeper in 1719. The proprietary constituted up to 5,000,000 acres (20,000 km^{2}) of Virginia's Northern Neck and a vast area spanning west to the North Branch Potomac River headwaters. The Northern Neck Proprietary had been awarded by the exiled Charles II of England to seven of his supporters in 1649, and again in 1688 by official patent. One of these seven supporters, Lord Colepeper, acquired the right to the entire proprietary in 1681, and his grandson, Lord Fairfax, inherited the land grant upon the death of his mother, Katherine Colepeper. Lord Fairfax dispatched his first cousin William Fairfax (1691–1757) to replace Robert Carter I as the steward and land agent for the Northern Neck Proprietary, a position in which Fairfax served until his death in 1757. In 1750, Martin's uncle Lord Fairfax established himself at his hunting plantation Greenway Court estate near present-day White Post in Clarke County with the intention of administering the proprietary himself. Lord Fairfax had previously reserved this land as his private residence in 1747, then known as "the Quarter". With his cousin William Fairfax acting as land agent, Lord Fairfax sought additional assistance in managing the proprietary and scrutinized which of his family members from England would be up to the task. Lord Fairfax first considered his brother Robert, then his brother-in-law Denny Martin, and in 1751, he finally decided upon enlisting the assistance of his twenty-year-old nephew and Denny Martin's son, Thomas Bryan Martin.

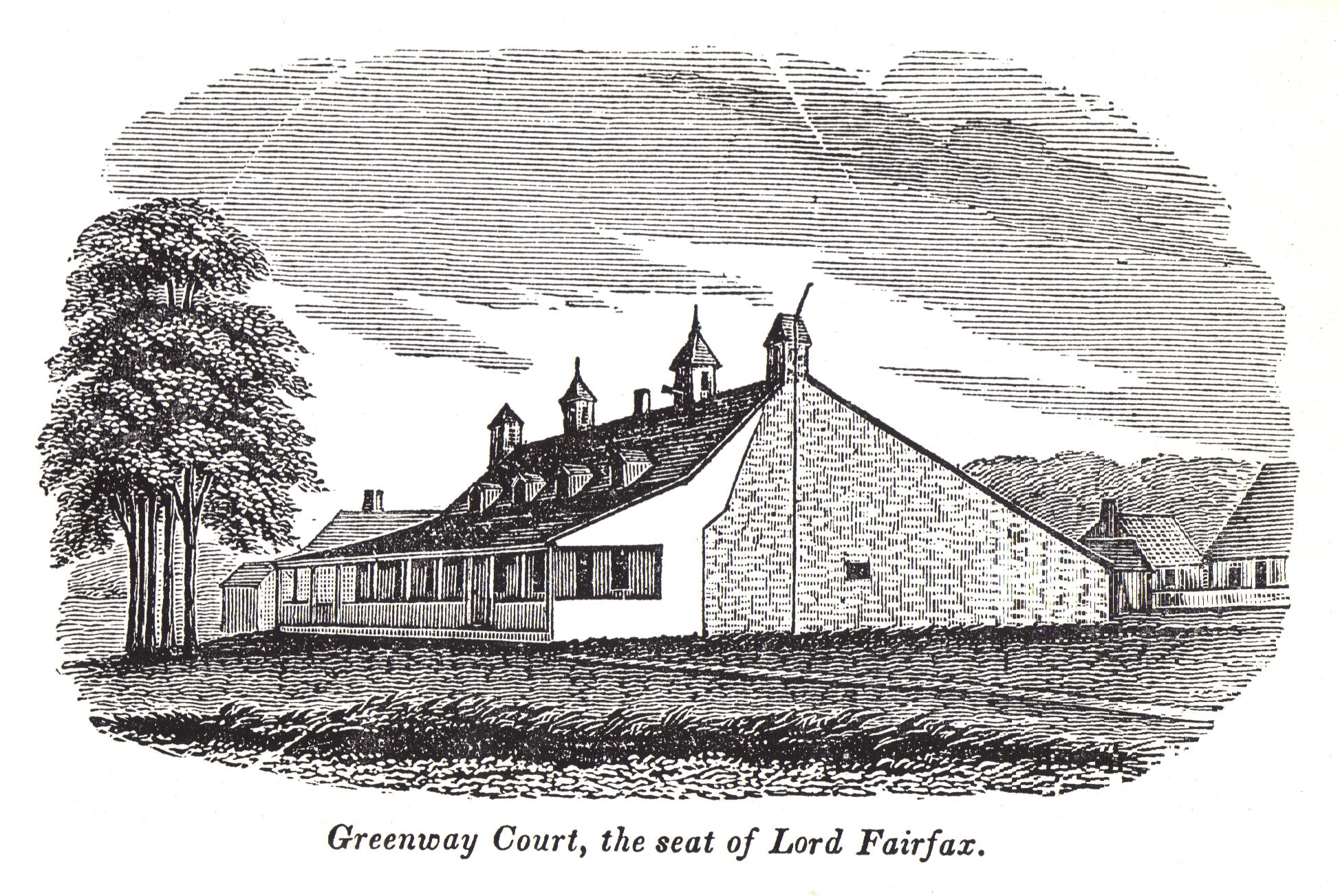
An early 19th-century engraving of the main house at Greenway Court

Lord Fairfax sent for Martin, who arrived in Virginia from England aboard the Hatley on May 24, 1751, accompanied by William Fairfax, who had been seeking an appointment to a position in England. Martin and Fairfax arrived in Williamsburg, where they dined with Fairfax's fellow Virginia Governor's Council member John Blair, Sr., and visited the Governor's Palace and the Capitol before beginning their journey toward the Northern Neck on May 31. Following his arrival at the Northern Neck Proprietary, Martin settled at Greenway Court with his uncle that autumn. Due to his humble upbringing, Martin quickly adapted to frontier life at Greenway Court. He soon earned the affections of Lord Fairfax on account of his energetic nature, his loyalty, and his good eyesight, which greatly assisted his myopic uncle. On May 21, 1752, shortly after Martin had come of age on his twenty-first birthday, Lord Fairfax granted Greenway Court to his nephew, along with 8,840 acres (35.8 km^{2}) of limestone lands on the west bank of the Shenandoah River across from Leeds Manor, which were "to be known and called by the name of the Manor of Greenway Court" and subject to an annual quit-rent fee of "a good buck and doe" due on the feast day of Saint Michael the Archangel. Greenway Court had taken its name from the Culpeper family's manor in Kent.

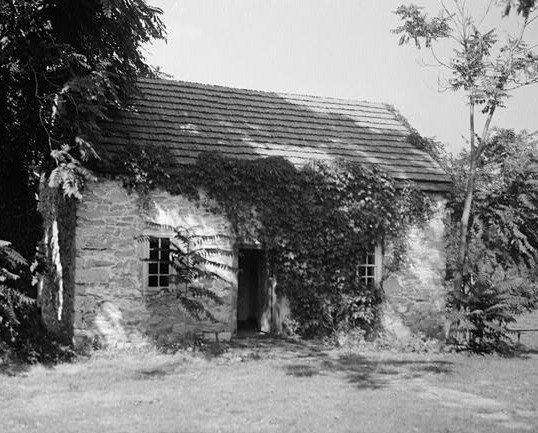
The proprietary Land Office at Greenway Court, photographed by the Historic American Buildings Survey

Desiring a larger role for himself in the proprietary's administration, Martin sought to influence his uncle into reorganizing the management of the proprietary. At Martin's suggestion, Lord Fairfax relocated the proprietary's base of operations 56 miles (90 km) northwest from Belvoir to an expressly built land office depository and archive at Greenway Court in 1762. Prior to this move, a small land office had been in operation at Greenway Court. Following William Fairfax's death in 1757, his son George William Fairfax (1729–1787) had succeeded him as steward and land agent of the proprietary. Martin succeeded Fairfax as the steward and land agent of the proprietary in 1762. Fairfax's replacement by Martin, the transfer of the land office and Martin's increased influence over Lord Fairfax caused bitter feelings from George William Fairfax, as evidenced by his letters during this period. Fairfax and his wife Sally Cary Fairfax returned to England in 1773 prior to the American Revolutionary War and did not return afterward.

While residing at Greenway Court, Martin would have preferred more comfortable quarters than the rustic estate, as their living situation there was originally supposed to have been only temporary until the construction of a grander estate. In 1767, Martin wrote that plans for further construction and improvements at Greenway Court "remain in status quo and in quo state they are likely to remain, ...we are building castles, tho' not on earth where one is greatly wanted, but castles in the air." Martin's uncle Robert Fairfax remarked on the primitive life at Greenway Court among "strange, brutish people... past all conception". For the next thirty years, until Lord Fairfax's death in 1781, Martin remained at Greenway Court and shared in the loneliness and solitude of his "self-exiled" uncle. While established at Greenway Court, Martin engaged in agricultural pursuits. In 1768, Martin described tobacco as the crop "which is our all". Like many other planters and farmers in the Shenandoah Valley, Martin had transitioned to the farming of wheat by 1792, at which time he wrote to his brother in England, "Are you all starving that you give such prices for our flour; farming is now my object."

== Political and civic affairs ==
In addition to his management of the proprietary, Martin began taking an active role in political and civil affairs within his uncle's domain. Following an act of the Virginia General Assembly in February 1752, the Anglican Frederick Parish was authorized to hold an election for twelve parish vestrymen before June 15 of that year. Martin was elected as a vestryman, alongside his uncle Lord Fairfax and Gabriel Jones. Martin and his fellow vestrymen set about expanding and enlarging the Anglican presence within the parish.

In 1754, upon the creation of Hampshire County, Martin presided as the inaugural justice of the county's court. Under the act establishing the county, the first county court was to have been held in June 1754; however, the first court was not held until December 1757. The first court to be held was, in addition to Martin, composed of justices James Simpson, William Miller, Solomon Hedges, and Nathaniel Kuykendall with Gabriel Jones serving as the Clerk of Court. In 1755, Martin was further appointed as the County Lieutenant of Hampshire County. Martin was then elected alongside Thomas Walker to the House of Burgesses representing Hampshire County from 1768 to 1758. In 1758, Martin and George Washington challenged the incumbents and ran for election to represent Frederick County in the House of Burgesses against Hugh West and Thomas Swearingen. Martin and Washington received considerable support from Lord Fairfax, and the leading Anglican cleric in Frederick County, William Meldrum. Washington received the most votes with 310, followed by Martin with 240 votes, 199 votes for West, and 45 votes for Swearingen. Martin and Washington served alongside one another representing Frederick County until 1761. Martin chose not to run for reelection and retired from legislative politics in 1761.

In September 1758, the Virginia General Assembly appointed Martin as one of the trustees of Winchester. Martin was further appointed as a trustee of the town of Stephensburg (present-day Stephens City). His uncle Lord Fairfax, John Hite, Gabriel Jones, Robert Rutherford, Lewis Stephens, and James Wood were also appointed trustees of the towns alongside Martin. When the town of Bath (present-day Berkeley Springs) received its charter from the Virginia General Assembly in October 1776, Martin was appointed as a trustee alongside Bryan Fairfax, Philip Pendleton, Robert Rutherford, Samuel Washington, Warner Washington, Alexander White, and others.

Martin was also appointed as the colonel of the Frederick County militia. While Martin was not in the best of health, he could be relied upon by the settlers of the proprietary to use his considerable resources to act promptly during an emergency, especially in response to attacks by Native Americans.

By the outbreak of the American Revolution, Martin was serving as an appointed justice on the Commission of Peace for Frederick County. Martin was reappointed as a justice of the peace by Governor Patrick Henry, along with William Booth and Warner Washington, but all three men declined to serve another term. Martin did not swear into the committee because he refused to serve under the new revolutionary regime, initially believing that American independence from Great Britain was a futile effort. The committee had also been actively arresting Loyalists, which may have influenced Martin's decision to turn down his reappointment. Martin retreated from performing civil service entirely, and afterward retired to Greenway Court. Prior to his death, Martin became an active Freemason.

== American Revolution and Lord Fairfax's death ==
As a Loyalist, Martin maintained a low profile following the outbreak of the American Revolutionary War. By 1778, the Virginia General Assembly had abolished quit-rents, but in recognition of Lord Fairfax's loyalty, the Northern Neck Proprietary was made an exception. Lord Fairfax was treated with respect and consideration by the assembly, and despite being the only resident peer in the American colonies, he was accorded all the privileges of a Virginia citizen. Following the death of Lord Fairfax in 1781, his will was recorded on March 5, 1782, and conveyed his title to the remnants of his American properties, including the Northern Neck Proprietary, to Martin's elder brother Reverend Denny Martin, who then assumed the surname and coat of arms of Fairfax. Lord Fairfax devised his property and title to Denny Martin on the condition that he apply to the Parliament of Great Britain for an act to authorize him to inherit the title of Lord Fairfax of Cameron. The late Lord Fairfax had appointed as joint executors of his will and estate, Martin, Gabriel Jones and Peter Hog. Martin also inherited the plantation Lord Fairfax had purchased from John Borden consisting of 600 acres (2.4 km^{2}), the Greenway Court estate and "all the stock of cattle, sheep, hogs, implements of husbandry, household goods and furniture" there. Martin and his brothers Denny and Philip also inherited all Lord Fairfax's slaves. However, Martin's uncle and Lord Fairfax's brother Robert Fairfax appealed his claim to the title of Lord Fairfax of Cameron to Parliament, and succeeded as the 7th Lord Fairfax of Cameron.

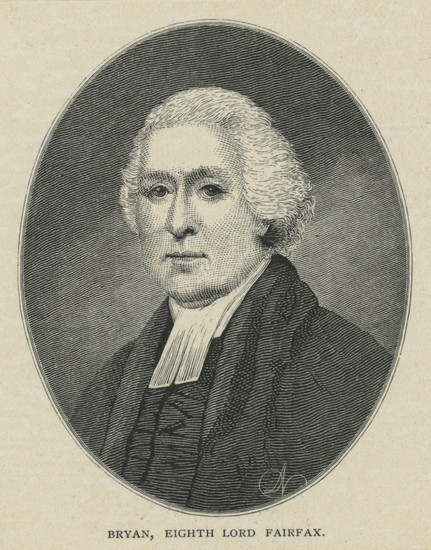
Bryan Fairfax, 8th Lord Fairfax of Cameron

Because he did not wish to leave England, Denny Fairfax appointed Martin and Jones as managers of the proprietary. As required in Virginia, they placed newspaper advertisements telling proprietary tenants to bring their claims against the Lord Fairfax estate forward and prove them. Meanwhile, one of the surveyors Martin used, Thomas Marshall, who also lived on Oak Hill plantation in the Leeds Manor tract, moved to Kentucky in 1785, but his son, John Marshall had become a successful attorney in Richmond, as well as kept up his father's Oak Hill plantation in Fauquier County. Martin hired Marshall to secure approval of the 6th Fairfax's claim to the proprietary, which he did in Fairfax v. Hite (1786). Also descendants of William Fairfax continued to assert back claims against the estates of Lord Fairfax, which had been rendered by William Fairfax prior to 1757. In order to absolve himself of these back claims, Denny Fairfax renounced his appointments of Martin and Jones, and instead appointed Bryan Fairfax, 8th Lord Fairfax of Cameron as the sole steward of the proprietary in an official transposition in London on September 21, 1784.

Because Denny Fairfax was a British subject residing in England, Virginians argued he and other British relatives were "alien enemies", and thus escheat laws could confiscate his Virginia property. In 1785, the Virginia General Assembly ordered that all records, books, and documents pertaining to the proprietary's lands be confiscated by the state of Virginia and removed to the Virginia State Land Registrar's Office in Richmond. Virginia seized the remaining proprietary lands that had not yet been granted, although citizens who had already acquired grants from the proprietary could keep their land. In 1786, governor Patrick Henry began selling some of the confiscated undeveloped lands, which soon led to rounds of litigation which reached the Virginia Court of Appeals, then the U.S. Supreme Court after Martin's death, as Fairfax's Devisee v. Hunter's Lessee (1813) and Martin v. Hunter's Lessee (1816). Despite considerable litigation in Virginia, land values in the Northern Neck Proprietary continued to increase, and Thomas Marshall was only one of many who kept moving westward to the new frontier, as Martin noted in a 1790 letter: "The emigration of inhabitants is... astonishing.

== Personal life, death and legacy ==
Following the death of Lord Fairfax in 1781, Martin took his uncle's housekeeper Mrs. Crawford as his mistress, and fathered a daughter by her. Mrs. Crawford remained Martin's mistress for several years until her death. Their daughter married British captain Francis Geldart; however, she died without issue soon after their marriage, and Martin gave Geldart 1,000 acres (4.0 km^{2}) of Greenway Court and a number of slaves. Following the death of his daughter, Martin employed housekeeper Betsy Powers at Greenway Court. Martin died unmarried in 1798, and his will dated July 24, 1794, was proved on October 1, 1798. In it, he bequeathed his Greenway Court estate and an adjoining 1,000 acres (4.0 km^{2}) to his housekeeper Betsy Powers. Powers also inherited "all houses thereon, household goods (except plate and watch), one half of stock of horses, cattle, sheep and hogs and choice of ten slaves". Martin's living sisters Frances, Sybilla, and Anna Susanna Martin received "all moneys, and remainder of personal property" not bequeathed to Powers. Each of the executors of Martin's will received ten guineas. Martin bequeathed the remainder of his property and the 1,000 acres (4.0 km^{2}) of Greenway Court, should Powers have predeceased him, to his will executors Gabriel Jones, Robert Mackey, and John Sherman Woodcock to divide into parcels and sell, the profits from which were to be given to Martin's sisters. Powers also received a chariot, harness, and 160 acres (0.65 km^{2}) in Stafford County near Falmouth. Following Martin's death, Powers married W. Carnagy.

As litigation in Virginia proceeded, Martin's brother Denny Fairfax did not want to move there to defeat the escheat actions. Instead, he negotiated with James Markham Marshall, who visited England in the winter of 1793, and represented a Marshall family coalition that wanted to buy the Leeds Manor and South Branch tracts, but did not have financing. After John Marshall negotiated a deal and the Virginia General Assembly passed a law, the Marshall group secured temporary financing, so on August 30, 1797, Martin conveyed title to "all and every of those divers tracts, pieces and parcels of land, being part and parcel of the proprietary of the Northern Neck of Va., with all beneficial right and interest of whatsoever nature the same may be". The Marshall group then conveyed its interest in the undeveloped lands to the Commonwealth of Virginia. These conveyances would terminate the Fairfax and Martin families' interest in the proprietary. In 1799, the Virginia General Assembly authorized Marshall as the legal titleholder of Fairfax's remaining landholdings. However, the Marshall coalition did not complete their final payment until 1806, when the Northern Neck Proprietary was officially dissolved and Virginia again became legal owner of the undeveloped lands.

Proprietor Adam Stephen, a close personal friend of Martin, had the town of Martinsburg in Berkeley County formally established by the Virginia General Assembly in 1778. Stephen named the town in honor of his friend Martin.

== Bibliography ==
- Brannon, Selden W., ed. (1976). Historic Hampshire: A Symposium of Hampshire County and Its People, Past and Present. Parsons, West Virginia: McClain Printing Company. ISBN 978-0-87012-236-1. OCLC 3121468.
- Brown, Stuart E. Jr. (2008). Virginia Baron: The Story of Thomas 6th Lord Fairfax. Baltimore: Genealogical Publishing Company. ISBN 978-0-8063-5218-3. OCLC 54106748. Archived from the original on April 15, 2016 – via Google Books.
- Cartmell, Thomas Kemp (1909). Shenandoah Valley Pioneers and Their Descendants: A History of Frederick County, Virginia (illustrated) from Its Formation in 1738 to 1908. Winchester, Virginia: Eddy Press Corporation. ISBN 978-0-7222-4630-6. OCLC 583806244. Archived from the original on April 22, 2016 – via Google Books.
- Harrison, Fairfax (July 1925). "The Proprietors of the Northern Neck: Chapters of Culpeper Genealogy". The Virginia Magazine of History and Biography. 33 (3). Richmond, Virginia: Virginia Historical Society: 223–267. ISSN 2330-1317. JSTOR 4244022. OCLC 60624252.
- Harrison, Fairfax (January 1926). "The Proprietors of the Northern Neck: Chapters of Culpeper Genealogy". The Virginia Magazine of History and Biography. 34 (1). Richmond, Virginia: Virginia Historical Society: 19–64. ISSN 2330-1317. JSTOR 4244064. OCLC 60624252.
- Hofstra, Warren R. (1999). A Separate Place: The Formation of Clarke County, Virginia. Madison, Wisconsin: Madison House Publishers. ISBN 978-0-945612-70-4. OCLC 43288866. Archived from the original on April 11, 2016 – via Google Books.
- Kercheval, Samuel (1902). Charles James Faulkner; John Jeremiah Jacob (eds.). A History of the Valley of Virginia. Woodstock, Virginia: W. N. Grabill. OCLC 583806184 – via Internet Archive.
- Lissandrello, Stephen (March 15, 1975). National Register of Historic Places Registration Form: Greenway Court (PDF). United States Department of the Interior, National Park Service, Historic Sites Survey. Archived from the original on February 7, 2016.
- Longmore, Paul K. (1999). The Invention of George Washington. Charlottesville, Virginia: University of Virginia Press. ISBN 978-0-8139-1872-3. OCLC 39860113. Archived from the original on April 18, 2016 – via Google Books.
- Munske, Roberta R.; Kerns, Wilmer L., eds. (2004). Hampshire County, West Virginia, 1754–2004. Romney, West Virginia: The Hampshire County 250th Anniversary Committee. ISBN 978-0-9715738-2-6. OCLC 55983178.
- Norris, J. E., ed. (1890). History of the Lower Shenandoah Valley Counties of Frederick, Berkeley, Jefferson and Clarke. Chicago: A. Warner & Company. OCLC 181016569 – via Internet Archive.
- Russell, T. Triplett; Gott, John K. (2008). Fauquier County in the Revolution. Westminster, Maryland: Heritage Books. ISBN 978-1-888265-60-6. OCLC 45188611. Archived from the original on April 23, 2016 – via Google Books.
- Smith, Jean Edward (2014). John Marshall: Definer of a Nation. New York City: Henry Holt and Company. ISBN 978-1-4668-6231-9. OCLC 34576755. Archived from the original on April 29, 2016 – via Google Books.
- Tyler, Lyon Gardiner (1915). Encyclopedia of Virginia Biography. New York City: Lewis Historical Publishing Company. OCLC 848289351. OL 7149774M.
- Tyler's Quarterly Historical and Genealogical Magazine (2007). Genealogies of Virginia Families from Tyler's Quarterly Historical and Genealogical Magazine. Baltimore: Genealogical Publishing Company. ISBN 978-0-8063-0947-7. OCLC 191750471. Archived from the original on April 2, 2016 – via Google Books.

Virginia House of Delegates
Preceded by Gabriel Jones; Mr. Parker	Member of the House of Burgesses from Hampshire County; 1756–1758; Served alongside: Thomas Walker	Succeeded by Gabriel Jones; Thomas Walker
Preceded by Thomas Swearingen; Hugh West	Member of the House of Burgesses from Frederick County; 1758–1761; Served alongside: George Washington	Succeeded by George Mercer
