= Towlston Grange =

18th-century plantation in Great Falls, Virginia, U.S.

Coordinates: 38°57′23″N 77°15′38″W

Towlston Grange is an 18th-century plantation in Great Falls in Fairfax County, Virginia, United States. The estate served as a residence for several prominent members of the Fairfax family. Towlston Grange is located at 1213 Towlston Road in Great Falls. There is a photograph of Bryan Fairfax's Towlston Grange in its unrestored state, taken by "The Rambler" of the Washington, D.C. Evening Star newspaper in 1918, that shows a 1 1/2-story clapboarded house built in the English tradition.[4] George Washington visited this estate on several occasions, including on March 4, 1767 he and his wife Martha traveled to Towlston Grange to stand as the godparents to Bryan Fairfax's son Ferdinando.

== Residents ==
=== William Fairfax ===
William Fairfax acquired several thousand acres on Difficult Run from his cousin Thomas Fairfax, 6th Lord Fairfax of Cameron and named his property Towlston Grange.

=== George William Fairfax ===
William's eldest son George William Fairfax and his wife Sally Fairfax née Cary settled at Towlston Grange after their marriage in 1759.

=== Bryan Fairfax ===
Bryan Fairfax lived at Towlston Grange from 1768 until 1790. Bryan was given Towlston Grange with its adjacent 5,500 acres (22 km^{2}) Towlston Manor in his father William's will.

I also give bequeath and devise unto my Son Bryan and his Heirs for Ever all my Tract of Land near and below Difficult Run in the aforesaid County containing about Five thousand five hundred Acres together with the House, Edifices, Stock and Appurtenances thereon known and calld in my Deed by the Name of Towlston Grange, and likewise give and bequeath unto my said Son Bryan and his Heirs for Ever my Negroes now employd thereon named Pipero, Punch, Adam, Old Sarah and her Daughter Betty and their Issue, Omah and her Children Scipio, Sarah, Dolly & their Issue also my waiting Boy Jack lately purchased of Mr. Amblery.

His friend George Washington and Martha Washington traveled to Towlston Grange to stand as godparents for Bryan's third son, Fedinando. Fairfax sold Towlston Grange to George Washington for £82.10. He moved to Mount Eagle (plantation), (south of Hunting Creek, and Alexandria), where he lived from 1790, until his death. Upon the death of his cousin Robert Fairfax, 7th Lord Fairfax of Cameron in 1793, Bryan inherited the title of eighth Lord Fairfax of Cameron.

"Bryan Fairfax inherited Towlston Manor in 1757 upon the death of his father, William Fairfax, cousin of Thomas, Lord Fairfax, for whom Fairfax County was named. Lord Fairfax later gave him the adjoining Great Falls Manor of 12,588 acres in 1765.

The house, Towlston Grange, was built while Bryan and his family were in England in 1766 or shortly after his return. On March 4, 1767, Martha and George Washington traveled to Towlston to stand as godparents for Bryan's third son, Ferdinando. The first known letter to his friend George Washington with the Towlston address is dated 1768. Washington's diaries, Bryan's letters, and Fairfax tradition recount the many happy visits that Washington made to Bryan, Elizabeth, and their young family in this home.

The Virginia census of 1782 noted Towlston Grange as having one dwelling, ten outbuildings, six white persons and 18 slaves, a modest plantation. Most of Towlston Manor was leased to farmers. In 1790, Bryan moved into a grander house he built outside of Alexandria that he named Mount Eagle. George Washington wrote Fairfax, commenting on how happy he was to have him closer to Mount Vernon." (From the 1999 GFHS Calendar.)[4]

=== The Smith's ===
The Smith Family owned Towlston Grange from 1801 to 1933. In 1801 George and Kerenhappoch Smith purchased the track of land known as Towlston. The Towlston track included Bryan Fairfax's house "Towlston Grange". With George and Kerenhappoch's passing, their property was partitioned in 1811 with Samuel and Elizabeth Offutt Smith receiving the "house track" of the estate.

Then in 1842 Temple and Sarah Oliver Smith inherited Lot#3, "The House Lot". At Sarah's passing "The House Lot" went to her daughter Sarah Smith Shelley. It was in 1914 that Sarah S. Shelley conveyed Towlston Grange to her nephew, Alfred L Leigh, the son of Annie Smith Leigh and Lewis C Leigh. Alfred L Leigh sold his maternal grandmother, Sarah Oliver Smith house to C.J.S. Durham in 1933.

In 1937 Mrs. Mary Smith Iden, the middle daughter of Temple and Sarah Smith, visited the house where she was born. In reply to a comment that George Washington never slept at Towlston, she replied "well, maybe not, but he had breakfast their a-plenty". [5]

In 1963 Mildred H Richie, researcher and genealogist was commissioned by A.L. Leigh and C.J.S. Durham to make a comprehensive study of Towlston Grange. The study titled "Towlston, Fairfax County, Virginia" documents the owners from 1719 to 1933 and is archived at the Virginia Room of the Fairfax Library.

=== Jack and Ethel Durham ===
Jack and Ethel Durham purchased and restored Towlston Grange in the 1930s. Jack served as the Chairman of the Fairfax County History Commission. Ethel co-founded Langley (Cooperative) School in McLean. They raised a daughter, Nancy. They promoted the creation of the Great Falls National Park, and advocated the restoration of the Patowmack Canal, and preservation the C & O Canal right-of-way as a national park.
