= Ferdinando Fairfax =

American landowner (1774–1820)

The Honorable Ferdinando Fairfax JP
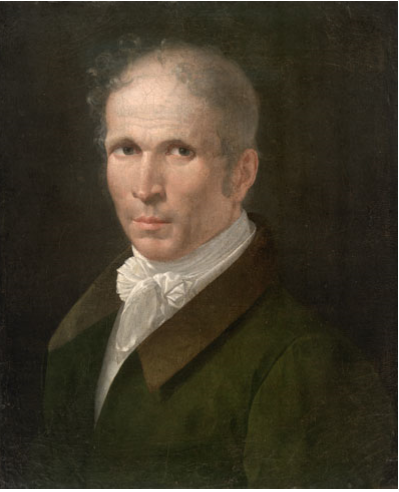
- Born: 1766 or 1774; Colony of Virginia, British America
- Died: September 24/26, 1820; Mount Eagle, Fairfax County, Virginia or Jefferson County, Virginia, U.S.
- Occupation: Planter
- Spouse: Elizabeth Blair Cary
- Children: 10
- Parent(s): Bryan Fairfax, 8th Lord Fairfax of Cameron; Elizabeth Cary
- Relatives: Thomas Fairfax, 9th Lord Fairfax of Cameron (brother); Sally Fairfax (aunt); George William Fairfax (uncle); William Fairfax (grandfather)

Ferdinando Fairfax (1766/1774 – September 24/26, 1820) was an American landowner and member of the noble Fairfax family.

== Early life ==
He was the youngest son of Bryan Fairfax, 8th Lord Fairfax of Cameron (1736–1802) and Elizabeth Cary. His brother was Thomas Fairfax, 9th Lord Fairfax of Cameron (1762–1846) and his grandfather was Col. William Fairfax (1691–1757). George Washington and Martha Washington, who traveled to Towlston Grange after his birth, were his godparents. Ferdinando was the heir to his uncle, George William Fairfax (1729–1787), son of William Fairfax (1691–1757), who was married to Sally Cary (ca. 1730–1811), his mother Elizabeth's sister. George William Fairfax was Washington's close friend.

== Career ==
Fairfax served as a justice of the peace for Jefferson County, Virginia and was, at the same time, the largest slave owner in the County.

Fairfax offered his own "practicable scheme" for ending slavery through colonization when he developed his "Plan for Liberating the Negroes within the United States" in 1790. Many of these plans were similar in that they wanted the abolition of slaves to be gradual, they wanted the government to compensate the slave owners for the lost property, they wanted the government to pay to educate and prepare free blacks for life as independent people, and they wanted to colonize the freed slaves in a separate place from the white society. This was because most people at the time believed that the races would not be able to get along if they tried to live together.

Fairfax was attracted to visionary schemes and also spent money resolving squatter lawsuits. His estate, Shannon Hill in present-day Jefferson County, West Virginia, was sold by his daughter in 1825 and the original home was demolished.

== Personal life ==
Fairfax's son, George William Fairfax, painted by Joseph Wood (1816)

Ferdinando married his first cousin Elizabeth Blair Cary, daughter of Wilson Miles Cary and Sarah Blair. The couple had the following children:

- George William Fairfax (born November 5, 1797), who married Isabella McNeil
- Wilson Miles Cary Fairfax, who married Lucy Griffeth
- Farinda Fairfax, who married Perrin Washington, a descendant of George Washington's brother Samuel Washington (1734–1781).
- Mary Fairfax who married Rev. Samuel Hagins
- Sally Fairfax
- Ferdinando Fairfax II, who married Mary Jett
- Christiana Fairfax, who married Thomas Ragland
- William Henry Fairfax
- Thomas Fairfax
- Archibald Blair Fairfax

=== Descendants ===
The Union officer in the United States Navy during the American Civil War, Donald McNeill Fairfax (1818–1894), was his grandson.
