= William Fairfax (disambiguation) =

William Fairfax (1691–1757) was the builder of the Belvoir estate and plantation.

William Fairfax may also refer to:

- William Fairfax (died 1514), Justice of the Common Pleas
- William Fairfax (died 1597), MP for Boroughbridge and Yorkshire
- William Fairfax (soldier) (1609–1644)
- William George Fairfax (1739–1813), vice-admiral in the Royal Navy
- Sir William George Herbert Taylor Ramsay-Fairfax, 2nd Baronet (1831–1902), of the Fairfax Baronets

== See also ==
- George William Fairfax, planter
