= Admiral Fairfax =

Admiral Fairfax may refer to:

- Donald McNeill Fairfax (1818–1894), U.S. Navy rear admiral
- Henry Fairfax (Royal Navy officer) (1837–1900), British Royal Navy admiral
- Robert Fairfax (Royal Navy officer) (1666–1725), British Royal Navy rear admiral
- William George Fairfax (1739–1813), British Royal Navy vice admiral
