= Ash Grove (plantation) =

Coordinates: 38.9319°N 77.2499°W

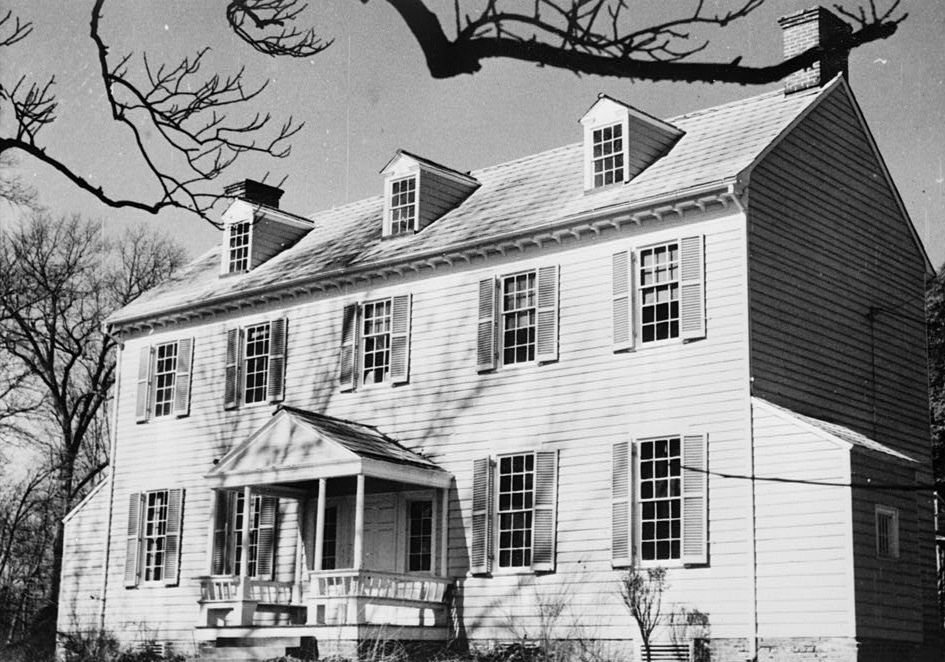
Ash Grove, Fairfax County, Virginia

Ash Grove is an 18th-century plantation house in Fairfax County, Virginia, United States. In 1790, Bryan Fairfax built Ash Grove on Leesburg Pike, two miles west of present-day Tysons Corner, for his son Thomas Fairfax.

Ash Grove is said to have been named for an older Fairfax family house in England. In his later years, Thomas bought Vaucluse Plantation, near Alexandria, Virginia, and bestowed Ash Grove upon his second son, Henry. He married Caroline Herbert of Maryland, and they had several children, and operated a boarding school for young ladies.

Captain Henry Fairfax died during the Mexican–American War, at Saltillo, Mexico, on August 14, 1847. The property was purchased by James Sherman on June 20, 1851.

Descendants on occasion relate some interesting family lore of American Civil War events when the neighborhood was a "no man's land."

James Sherman died in spring 1865, and left the property to his son, Franklin Sherman (February 11, 1843 - April 9, 1915), Lieutenant in the 10th Michigan Cavalry. He returned after the Civil War to farm, was Sheriff, member of the Board of Supervisors, and School Board. (A Fairfax County Elementary School is named for him.) The property passed to Wells Alvord Sherman, and then Wilson C Sherman.

The house was purchased from the Sherman family in 1997, and dedicated as a Fairfax County, Virginia, park.

== See also ==
Historic houses in Virginia
