= Donald McNeill Fairfax =

United States Navy admiral (1818–1894)

Donald MacNeill Fairfax
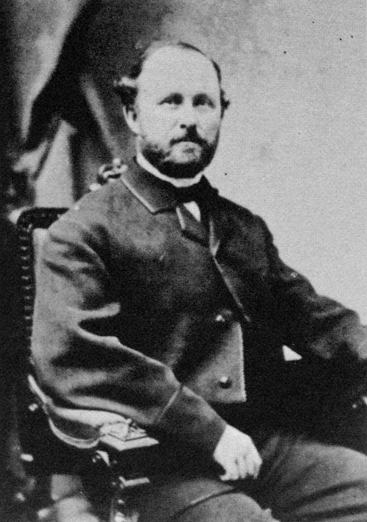
- Born: August 10, 1822; Mount Eagle, Fairfax County, Virginia, U.S.
- Died: January 10, 1894 (aged 75); Hagerstown, Maryland, U.S.
- Military career
- Allegiance: United States of America
- Branch: United States Navy
- Service years: 1837–1881
- Rank: Rear admiral
- Commands: Cayuga; Nantucket; Montauk
- Conflicts: American Civil War

Donald MacNeil Fairfax (March 10, 1818 – January 10, 1894) was an officer in the United States Navy during the American Civil War.

== Early life and family ==
The son of George William Fairfax, and Isabella McNeill, grandson of the Hon. Ferdinando Fairfax, and great-grandson of Bryan Fairfax, 8th Lord Fairfax of Cameron, he was born at Mount Eagle, Virginia. Fairfax entered the Navy as a midshipman on August 12, 1837. His younger brother, Edwin Cary Fairfax (1833-1912), also served in the Union Army, enlisting in the 5th Pennsylvania Cavalry, Company D.

== Trent Affair ==
As executive officer in San Jacinto, he was a participant in the 1861 "Trent Affair," a diplomatic controversy involving the U.S. Navy's removal of Confederate commissioners from the British mail-steamer, RMS Trent. On November 8, 1861, Fairfax boarded Trent to remove Confederate commissioners James M. Mason and John Slidell, after the ship had been stopped by his captain, Charles Wilkes.

Wilkes had given Fairfax the following written instructions:

On boarding her you will demand the papers of the steamer, her clearance from Havana, with the list of passengers and crew.

Should Mr. Mason, Mr. Slidell, Mr. Eustice [sic] and Mr. McFarland be on board make them prisoners and send them on board this ship and take possession of her [the Trent] as a prize. … They must be brought on board.

All trunks, cases, packages and bags belonging to them you will take possession of and send on board this ship; any dispatches found on the persons of the prisoners, or in possession of those on board the steamer, will be taken possession of, examined, and retained if necessary

Fairfax demanded the passenger list, but Mason and Slidell identified themselves. He escorted Mason by the collar, to the cutter, and with two officers took hold of Slidell from the main cabin. He failed to claim Trent as a prize, citing the loss of manpower of a prize crew (avoiding a worse incident).

== Civil War service ==
Fairfax's distinguished service in the Civil War included command of the Cayuga, Nantucket and Montauk.

Fairfax was later promoted to flag rank, retiring as a rear admiral on September 30, 1881. He retired to Hagerstown, Maryland, where he served on the vestry of Saint John's Church. Admiral Fairfax died in 1894.

== Namesake ==
In 1917 the Wickes-class destroyer USS Fairfax (DD-93) was named in his honor.
