= Thomas Fairfax, 9th Lord Fairfax of Cameron =

American planter

The Right Honorable The Lord Fairfax of Cameron
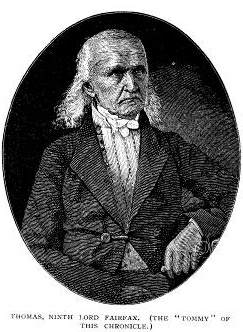
- Years active: 1802—1846
- Born: 1762; Colony of Virginia, British America
- Died: April 21, 1846 (aged 83–84); Fairfax County, Virginia, U.S.
- Parents: Bryan Fairfax, 8th Lord Fairfax of Cameron; Elizabeth Cary

Thomas Fairfax, 9th Lord Fairfax of Cameron (1762 – April 21, 1846) was an American planter and peer. When styled as Master Fairfax, he traveled with his father Lord Fairfax on December 11, 1799 to Mount Vernon. They were among the last guests of President Washington before he died.

== Early life and family ==
Thomas Fairfax was born in 1762. He was the son of Bryan Fairfax, 8th Lord Fairfax of Cameron (1736–1802) and his wife, Elizabeth Cary, daughter of Colonel Wilson Cary and Sarah Cary. His brother was Ferdinando Fairfax (1766–1820), whose godparents were George Washington and Martha Washington.

=== Plantation ===
In 1802, he succeeded to the title of Lord Fairfax of Cameron, a title in the peerage of Scotland, upon his father's death. He lived the life of a country squire overseeing his 40,000 acres (160 km^{2}), lived at Belvoir, Ash Grove, and Vaucluse, where he died.

== Personal life ==
He was thrice married: to Mary Aylett, Laura Washington and Margaret Herbert. By his third wife, he had seven children:

- Hon. Albert Fairfax, Master of Fairfax (1802–1835), who married Caroline Eliza Snowden (1812–1899) and had issue;
- Hon. Henry Fairfax (d. 1847), who fought and died in the Mexican–American War, at Saltillo, Mexico;
- Hon. Orlando Fairfax;
- Hon. Reginald Fairfax;
- Hon. Eugenia Fairfax;
- Hon. Aurelia Fairfax; and
- Hon. Monimia Fairfax (1820–1875), who married Archibald Cary (1815-1854), the son of the son of Wilson Jefferson Cary (1783–1823) and Virginia Randolph (1786–1852).

He maintained a winter home at 607 Cameron Street, Alexandria, Virginia, which he built in 1816.

He was a follower of Swedenborg. Because of these religious beliefs, he manumitted his slaves, some of whom he taught a trade and sponsored to colonize Liberia, under the American Colonization Society.

=== Descendants ===
His issue, the Hon. Albert Fairfax, Master of Fairfax, predeceased him, hence his grandson, California pioneer and politician Charles Fairfax, 10th Lord Fairfax of Cameron, inherited the peerage. Lord Charles Fairfax died without issue and the title passed to the younger grandson, physician and Virginia landowner John Fairfax, 11th Lord Fairfax of Cameron. The writer Constance Cary was his granddaughter through his daughter, the Hon. Monimia Cary.

His great-grandson, businessman Albert Fairfax, 12th Lord Fairfax of Cameron, moved to the United Kingdom, became a naturalized British citizen and a member of the House of Lords. Lord Albert Fairfax and his heirs sat in the House of Lords until the removal of hereditary peers in 2026.

He manumitted the great-great-great grandfather of legal scholar Roger Fairfax Jr., Dean of Howard University Law School, and Justin Fairfax, former Lieutenant Governor of Virginia.

== In popular culture ==
Thomas Fairfax was referenced by astrophysicist Neil deGrasse Tyson on rap musician Logic's 2017 album Everybody on the song "Waiting Room."

Peerage of Scotland
Preceded by Bryan Fairfax	Lord Fairfax of Cameron; 1802–1846	Succeeded by Charles S. Fairfax
