= Bryan Fairfax, 8th Lord Fairfax of Cameron =

American planter and clergyman

The Right Honorable The Lord Fairfax of Cameron
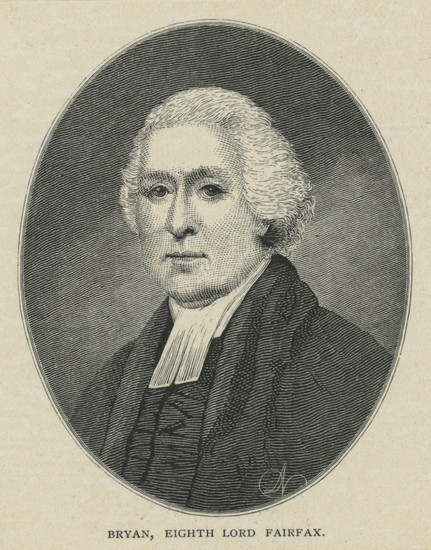
- Known for: Relationship with George Washington
- Born: August 11, 1736; Belvoir, Virginia, British America
- Died: August 7, 1802 (aged 65); Mount Eagle, Virginia, U.S.
- Spouses: Elizabeth Cary; Jennie
- Issue: 4, including Thomas Fairfax, 9th Lord Fairfax of Cameron and Ferdinando
- Occupation: Planter, clergyman

Bryan Fairfax, 8th Lord Fairfax of Cameron (August 11, 1736 – August 7, 1802) was an American planter, clergyman and peer. He was a lifelong friend of George Washington and became the first member of the British peerage to be born in North America, after travelling to England and reclaiming the peerage there. Fairfax was the first cousin once removed of Robert Fairfax, 7th Lord Fairfax of Cameron. He lived in Virginia for his entire life, and was the grandson of Henry Fairfax, a son of Henry Fairfax, 4th Lord Fairfax of Cameron. However, it was not until 1800 that he was confirmed in the title by the House of Lords.

== Early life and family ==
Bryan Fairfax was the son of Sir William Fairfax (1691–1757) of Belvoir and Deborah Clarke (1708–1746). As a young man, Fairfax lived at Belvoir with his father who was the business agent for his cousin, Thomas Fairfax, 6th Lord Fairfax of Cameron. His brother, George William (1729–1787) and his wife, Sally Cary Fairfax (1730–1811), also lived there and were close neighbors to George Washington's Mount Vernon. As a young man, George Washington and his brother, Lawrence Washington (1718–1752), visited the Fairfax family at Belvoir often and Lord Fairfax employed Washington to join a surveying team of his western lands, in the valley of Virginia.

=== Peerage ===
Fairfax did not pursue his peerage until 1798, while on a business trip to England. The previous Lord Fairfax, his cousin Robert, had died in 1793. After his death in 1802, his widow sued his executor, but the Supreme Court found for the executor in 1809. His son Thomas Fairfax became the 9th Lord Fairfax of Cameron.

== Career and land holdings ==
In 1740, he was deeded 3,400 acres (14 km^{2}), and 1741 was deeded 232 acres (0.94 km^{2}), at Little Run or Hunger Run.

In 1754, Bryan Fairfax clerked for his brother-in-law, John Carlyle (1720–1780), in Alexandria, Virginia, and was appointed as a deputy clerk for Fairfax County, Virginia. Bryan Fairfax served as a lieutenant in George Washington's militia regiment, in George Mercer's company early in the French and Indian War, but he resigned his commission in 1756. He later served as a justice for Fairfax County at the same time as Washington. Fairfax was an avid foxhunter, and he and Washington often rode together.

In 1757, he was given Towlston Grange with 5,500 acres (22 km^{2}), in his father's will. As a large landowner, Fairfax was active leasing out his property to smaller farmers, such as Perrygreen Mackness

In 1772, he deeded a 600-acre (2.4 km^{2}) farm, Chattins Run, on Goose Creek, in Fauquier County, Virginia to Washington to repay a debt.

In 1773, Fairfax deeded Towlston Grange to his daughter Elizabeth and her husband, David Griffith.

== Revolutionary War ==
When the Fairfax Resolves were debated in 1774, Fairfax corresponded with George Washington, the chairman of the committee considering the Resolves.

Fairfax was torn over the question of American independence during the American Revolutionary War. In 1777, he tried to travel to England and was arrested in Lancaster, Pennsylvania for refusing to sign an oath of loyalty. He wrote to George Washington, who sent him a pass to permit him to travel between the lines. After arriving in New York, British officials also sough an oath of loyalty as a prerequisite for transit. Fairfax again refused, and returned home. While en route, he visited Washington at Valley Forge.

=== Correspondence with Washington ===
When the Fairfax Resolves were debated in 1774, Fairfax sent the following letter to George Washington, the chairman of the committee considering the Resolves, giving reasons why they should not be adopted:

For I think myself bound to oppose violent measures now. The entering upon a Plan of having no Trade would be an arduous undertaking. I mean if persisted in, and if once entered upon it ought to be strictly kept. I therefore think it would be more proper to try first what Effect a petition might have toward obtaining a repeal of the Duty.

Washington responded, writing:

As to your political sentiments, I would heartily join you in them, so far as relates to a humble and dutiful petition to the throne, provided there was the most distant hope of success. But have we not tried this already? Have we not addressed the Lords, and remonstrated to the Commons? And to what end? Did they deign to look at our petitions? Does it not appear, as clear as the sun in its meridan brightness, that there is a regular, systematic plan formed to fix the right & practise of taxation upon us?

But Washington added:

That I differ very widely from you, in respect to the mode of obtaining a repeal of the Acts so much, & so justly complaind of, I shall not hesitate to acknowledge; & that this difference in opinion may, probably, proceed from the different Construction's we put upon the Conduct, & Intention of the Ministry, may also be true; But as I see nothing on the one hand, to induce a belief that the Parliament would embrace a favourable opportunity of Repealing Acts which they go on with great rapidity to pass, in order to enforce their Tyrannical System; and on the other, observe, or think I observe, that Government is pursuing a regular Plan at the expence of Law & justice, to overthrow our Constitutional Rights & liberties, how can I expect any redress from a Measure which hath been ineffectually tryd already—For Sir what is it we are contending against? Is it against paying the duty of 3d. pr lb. on Tea because burthensome? No, it is the Right only, we have all along disputed, & to this end we have already Petitiond his Majesty in as humble, & dutiful a manner as Subjects could do; ... I cannot conclude without expressing some concern that I should differ so widely in Sentiments from you in a matter of such great Moment & general Import; & should much distrust my own judgement upon the occasion, if my Nature did not recoil at the thought of Submitting to Measures which I think Subversive of every thing that I ought to hold dear and valuable – and did I not find, at the same time, that the voice of Mankind is with me.

Fairfax respectfully disagreed, writing:

There is a new opinion now lately advanced in Virginia that the Parliament have no right to make any or scarce any Laws binding on the Colonies. It has given me much Uneasiness. For altho' I wish as much as any one that we were legally exempted from it, yet I hold it clearly that we ought to abide by our Constitution. The common Consent and Acquiescence in the Colonies for such a Length of time is to me a clear Proof of their having a Right. And altho' it is said that it has only been exercised in Matters of Trade, it will be found to be a Mistake.

During September 1777, Fairfax was detained in Lancaster, Pennsylvania. However, he wrote to Washington, who sent him a pass to travel between the lines:

For the past two years I have had a strong Desire to enter into Holy Orders than ever I had before tho' frequently in my Life have had the same, yet generally suffered worldly considerations to interfere. This Desire and the not finding myself at Liberty to concur in the Public measures make me very anxious to get to England, and I have been in Hopes of obtaining a Pass from the Congress to go to N: York for that Purpose. There has appeared to me but one Objection, and that is, the giving of Intelligence, but I would not only enter into Engagements in that respect if required but it may [be] considered that what I might say would be of little Consequence, but if of any would rather of America because I really think that it would be the Interest of Great Britain to let her enjoy her Independence, for if successful in this Struggle which is very doubtful it might all be to do over again at another Time.

I intended to have seen Your Excellency before I left the warm Springs the last of August where Colo. Lewis, Your Brother & Mr. W. Washington and to have brought my Son Tommy with me, when I came home I found they had put him on the Militia Roll and draught him tho' under the Age required and therefore I had him excused. He is now with me, and I intended to have taken him with me, choosing to superintend his education.

... And if Your Excellency can give me a Pass that I may come & see You, I shall be very glad to do it whether I succeed in the other matter or not for You are often in my Mind & I have often sympathised with Yr. Ex. in regard to the great & laborious Undertaking You are engaged in ...

Washington responded, writing:

The difference in our political Sentiments never made any change in my friendship for you, and the favorable Sentiments I ever entertained of your hon'r, leaves me without a doubt that you would say any thing, or do any thing injurious to the cause we are engaged in after having pledged your word to the contrary. I therefore give my consent readily ...

== Personal life ==
In 1757, after a whirlwind social scene in Westmoreland and Essex County, Fairfax's brother-in-law John Carlyle caught up with him in the Annapolis jail and brought him back to Belvoir.

In 1759, he married Elizabeth Cary, Lady Fairfax of Cameron (1738–1778), daughter of Colonel Wilson Cary and Sarah Pate. Lady Fairfax of Cameron was the sister of his brother's wife, Sally Cary Fairfax. Together, Bryan and Elizabeth had three children:

- Hon. Sally Cary Fairfax (1760-?)
- Thomas Fairfax, 9th Lord Fairfax of Cameron (1762–1846), who married three times. First to Mary Aylett, then Laura Washington, and finally to Margaret Herbert
- Hon. Ferdinando Fairfax (1766–1820), who married Elizabeth Blair Cary. George Washington and Martha Washington traveled to Towlston Grange to stand as godparents for Ferdinando.
- Hon. William Fairfax (1765–1782)
- Hon. Robert Fairfax (died as a child)
- Hon. Henry Fairfax (died as a child)
- Hon. Elizabeth Fairfax (1770–?), who married David Griffith

After his wife's death, Fairfax married Jennie Dennison (d. 1805). With her, he had another daughter:

- Hon. Anne Fairfax (born c. 1783), who married Charles Jefferson Catlett, Esq., a merchant from Norfolk, Virginia.

From 1760 until 1765, Fairfax lived at Greenhill at Accotink Creek and Back Road, on present-day Telegraph Road. He later moved to Towlston Grange in present-day Difficult Run and Leesburg Pike, now VA Route 7, where he lived from 1768 until 1790. In 1790, he moved to Mount Eagle, south of present-day Hunting Creek and Alexandria, where he lived until his death.

== In popular culture ==
On rap musician Logic's 2017 album Everybody in the song "Waiting Room," Bryan Fairfax is described as the next reincarnation of the character Atom.

== See also ==
- Lord Fairfax of Cameron

Peerage of Scotland
Preceded by Robert Fairfax	Lord Fairfax of Cameron; 1793–1802	Succeeded by Thomas Fairfax
