= Belvoir (plantation) =

- Belvoir Mansion Ruins and the Fairfax Grave
- U.S. National Register of Historic Places
- Virginia Landmarks Register
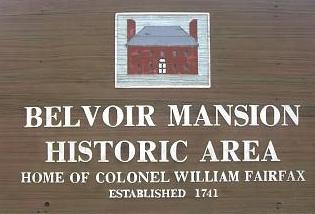
- Location of Fort Belvoir

- Location within Northern Virginia Location within Virginia Location within the United States
- Location: SE of intersection of 23rd St. and Belvoir Rd., parking lot on eastern side of Forney Loop Fort Belvoir, Virginia, U.S.
- Coordinates: 38°40′45.12″N 77°7′45.48″W
- Built: 1736
- NRHP reference No.: 73002337
- VLR No.: 029-0041

Significant dates
- Added to NRHP: June 04, 1973
- Designated VLR: December 2, 1969, July 17, 1973

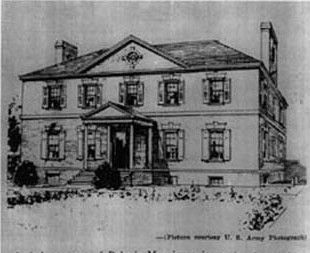
Belvoir Mansion, an artist's conception of the building before its destruction

Belvoir was the plantation and estate of colonial Virginia's prominent William Fairfax family. Operated with the labor of slaves, it was located on the west bank of the Potomac River on the present site of Fort Belvoir in Fairfax County, Virginia.

The main house, called Belvoir Manor or Belvoir Mansion, burned in 1783 and was destroyed during the War of 1812. The site has been listed on the National Register of Historic Places since 1973 as "Belvoir Mansion Ruins and the Fairfax Grave."

== History ==
=== 18th century ===
William Green's 1669 patent for 1,150 acres (4.7 km^{2}) encompassed most of the peninsula between Dogue Creek and Accotink Creek, along the Potomac River. Although this property was sub-divided and sold in the early 18th century, it was reassembled during the 1730s to create the central portion of Col. William Fairfax's 2,200-acre (8.9 km^{2}) plantation of Belvoir Manor.

==== Plantation house built ====
Fairfax's elegant new home was completed in 1741. The mansion was described in a 1774 rental notice as spacious and well-appointed. Its furnishings consisted of "tables, chairs, and every other necessary article...very elegant." The family imported ceramics from Europe and the Orient to grace its tables.

Planters such as William Fairfax comprised a small elite of Fairfax County's population; most of their neighbors were smaller farmers who sometimes barely managed to make a living. After William Fairfax's death in 1757, the plantation and his slaves passed to his eldest son George William Fairfax (1729–87).

==== Lord Fairfax and Washington visit ====
Thomas Fairfax, 6th Lord Fairfax of Cameron, moved to Virginia between 1735 and 1737 to inspect and protect his lands. Lord Fairfax came to Belvoir, to help oversee his family estates in Virginia's Northern Neck Proprietary between the Rappahannock and Potomac rivers, inherited from his mother, Catharine, daughter of Thomas Culpeper, 2nd Baron Culpeper of Thoresway; and a great portion of the Shenandoah and South Branch Potomac valleys. The northwestern boundary of his Northern Neck Proprietary was marked by the Fairfax Stone at the headwaters of the North Branch Potomac River.

Fairfax's sister Anne married Lawrence Washington in 1743. A young George Washington, Lawrence's half-brother, began to visit Belvoir frequently. Wishing to advance his brother's fortunes, Lawrence introduced George to George William. A friendship grew between the two men, despite the fact that George William was seven years older. A relationship blossomed between Sally Fairfax and Washington. Washington and Bryan Fairfax, George William's younger half-brother, also became friends.

In 1752, Lord Fairfax moved to Greenway Court in the valley of Virginia closer to his undeveloped land. He hired George Washington to survey land at Belvoir.

==== Abandonment ====
When Fairfax left Belvoir for England in 1773, he had the estate rented to Rev. Andrew Morton for seven years. Its furnishings were sold at auction in 1774. It was confiscated during the American Revolutionary War by the Virginia Act of 1779. In 1783, the mansion and several of its outbuildings were destroyed by fire, and the plantation complex gradually deteriorated into ruins. Ferdinando Fairfax, who inherited the property, apparently did not live there. The bluffs below the former mansion site were quarried for building stone, but the house site was not developed.

=== 19th century ===
Belvoir Plantation suffered further damage during the War of 1812. In August 1814, as British land forces attacked and burned the city of Washington, a British naval squadron sailed up the Potomac River and forced the surrender of Alexandria. The fleet began the 180-mile (290 km) return trip down river. On September 1, the British attempted to run the deep-water channel below the Belvoir house site, a position that previously had been identified as a strategic defensive location on the river. A hastily assembled American force, composed of Virginia and Alexandria militia under the command of U.S. Navy Captain David Porter, hurriedly began to mount a battery on the bluff above the river. For four days, British and American forces exchanged cannon and musket fire. The British fleet eventually passed the American positions, and British shells demolished what little was left of the old Belvoir Manor.

The association of Belvoir Plantation with the Fairfax family ended with the death of Ferdinando Fairfax in 1820. During the next decade, William Herbert of Alexandria acquired the property, which he quickly used as collateral for a loan. During the 1830s, Thomas Irwin, Herbert's creditor, operated the shad fisheries at White House Point. Herbert's continued inability to pay his debts eventually led to the sale of Belvoir at public auction in 1838.

All of the great 18th-century plantations in the Belvoir area changed considerably in the years before the Civil War. Soil exhaustion and inheritance prompted the sale and sub-division of these formerly expansive tracts of land. As a new generation of landowners took up residence in southeastern Fairfax County, patterns of land use and ownership were altered.

=== 20th century ===
In 1917, the Belvoir property was consolidated and ceded to the U.S. Army by Virginia, eventually lending its name to the modern military installation of Fort Belvoir.

The Belvoir ruins are on the National Register of Historic Places (1973), but access is restricted since they are on the military post.

== See also ==
- Historic houses in Virginia
