= Mount Eagle (plantation) =

Demolished plantation home in Fairfax County, Virginia, U.S.

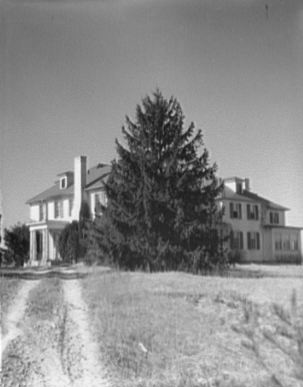
- Mount Eagle, after 1919

- Location within Northern Virginia

General information
- Coordinates: 38.789°N 77.072°W
- Construction started: 1789
- Completed: 1790
- Demolished: 1968

Mount Eagle was a plantation home built by Bryan Fairfax, 8th Lord Fairfax of Cameron in 1789–90, south of Hunting Creek and Alexandria in present-day Fairfax County, Virginia. It was demolished in 1968; the Huntington Metro Station and several condominium complexes were built on the property.

== History ==
The first colonial landowner of the area that Mount Eagle would be built upon was a tavern owner, John Mathews, who received a land patent for 1,567 acres (6.34 km^{2}) southwest of Hunting Creek in 1669. He eventually sold part of it to the merchant and land speculator, John Colville, of Newcastle upon Tyne, who put together a parcel of over 1,000 acres (4.0 km^{2}) which he called Cleesh. When he died in 1755, he left 1000 acres of Cleesh to his brother, Thomas, for life and thereafter to his cousin's husband, Charles Bennet, 4th Earl of Tankerville. Thomas died in 1764 and named George Washington as one of his executors. Settlement of the estate took over 30 years and lasted through the American Revolution and both of Washington's terms as President of the United States. In the meantime, Bennet had died and the plantation had passed to his son, The Hon. John Astley Bennet.

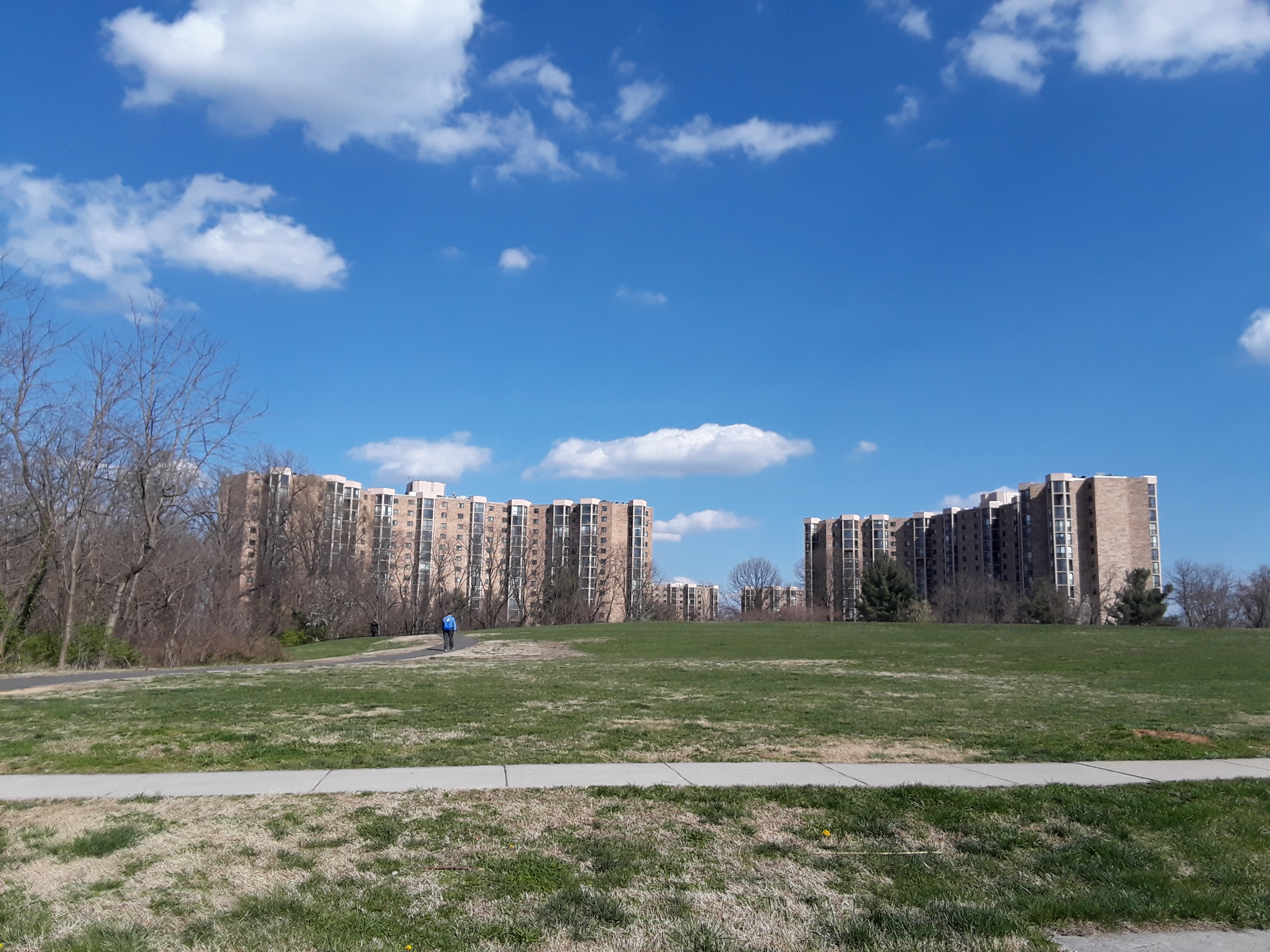
The Montebello Condominiums, erected on the former site of Mount Eagle after its 1968 demolition.

In 1789 Fairfax, by now a priest in the Episcopal Church, purchased 229.5 acres (0.929 km^{2}) from Bennet and built Mount Eagle, where he lived from 1790 until his death in 1802. Fairfax, a great friend of Washington, hosted Washington’s last meal away from Mount Vernon, on December 7, 1799. After the death of his wife, Jane Donaldson Fairfax, on 1 July 1805, the balance of their property was distributed amongst their heirs. His eldest son, Thomas, was executor of the estate, and began leasing out Mount Eagle with the first advertisement appearing in the Alexandria Gazette in 1806, placed by his cousin John Herbert. Herbert had either bought the property or was acting as Thomas's agent. His half-sister, Anne, and her husband filed suit in 1807 for an accounting of the estate that dragged through the courts until 1829 when it was decided against them. Herbert placed another advertisement in 1811 and his brother, William Herbert, sold the estate to Walter Jenifer six years later. Jenifer had financial problems the following year and attempted to sell Mount Eagle, but could not do so as the deed had not been recorded and the property reverted to William Herbert. He sold it to George Mason VI in 1825, but he only lived there for a few years before moving to Gunston Hall, and was only able to intermittently lease it, possibly because of its small 40-acre (0.16 km^{2}) size.

After Mason's death in 1834, his widow attempted to sell it for many years, but found no buyers until Court Johnson bought the property in 1845. During the American Civil War, the Union Army began construction of earthworks on the ridge southwest of Hunting Creek after the defeat at the First Battle of Bull Run in July 1861. The largest and westernmost of these was Fort Lyon, but only a small portion was on the Johnsons' property, unlike the smaller Fort Farnsworth. Fort Lyon was completed in early 1862 while Fort Farnsworth was completed later in the year to cover the southeast approaches to the ridge. The family did not remain in Mount Eagle during the entire war as there are records of it being used to quarter officers at various times.

On 9 June 1863, a magazine containing 8 short tons (7.3 t) of gunpowder and several thousand artillery shells exploded in Fort Lyon, killing 25 soldiers, and shattering windows in nearby buildings. The site of the explosion was inspected by a virtual parade of senior officers and officials the following day. The first was Brigadier General William Barry, chief of artillery of the Defenses of Washington and he was followed by Major General Samuel P. Heintzelman, commander of the Defenses of Washington. Later that day Abraham Lincoln, President of the United States, arrived; he was accompanied by the Secretary of War, Edwin Stanton and Brigadier General John Slough, military governor of Alexandria.

Mount Eagle was demolished in 1968, and the land is now used for the Montebello Condominiums and the Huntington Metro Station.

== See also ==
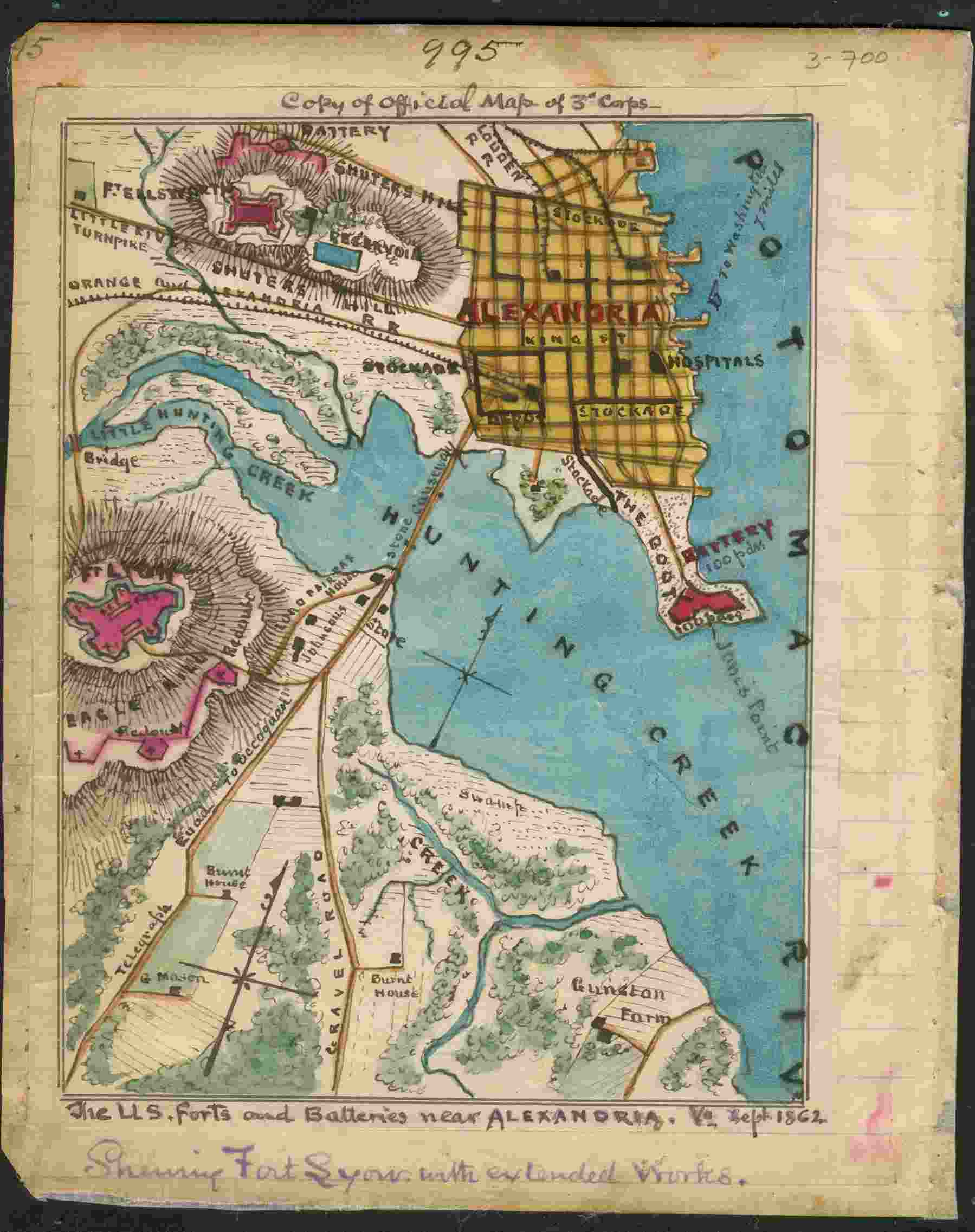
Map showing Fort Lyon

Historic houses in Virginia

== Bibliography ==
- A. Smith Bowman; Katherine S. Shands, eds. (1964–65). "Cleesh, Mount Eagle". Historical Society of Fairfax County, Virginia. 9. Vienna, Virginia: Independent Publishers: 43.
- Netherton, Nan. (1982) Montebello at Mount Eagle. Alexandria, Virginia: International Developers, Inc. OCLC 9402420
