= Sally Fairfax =

English gentry in Colonial Virginia

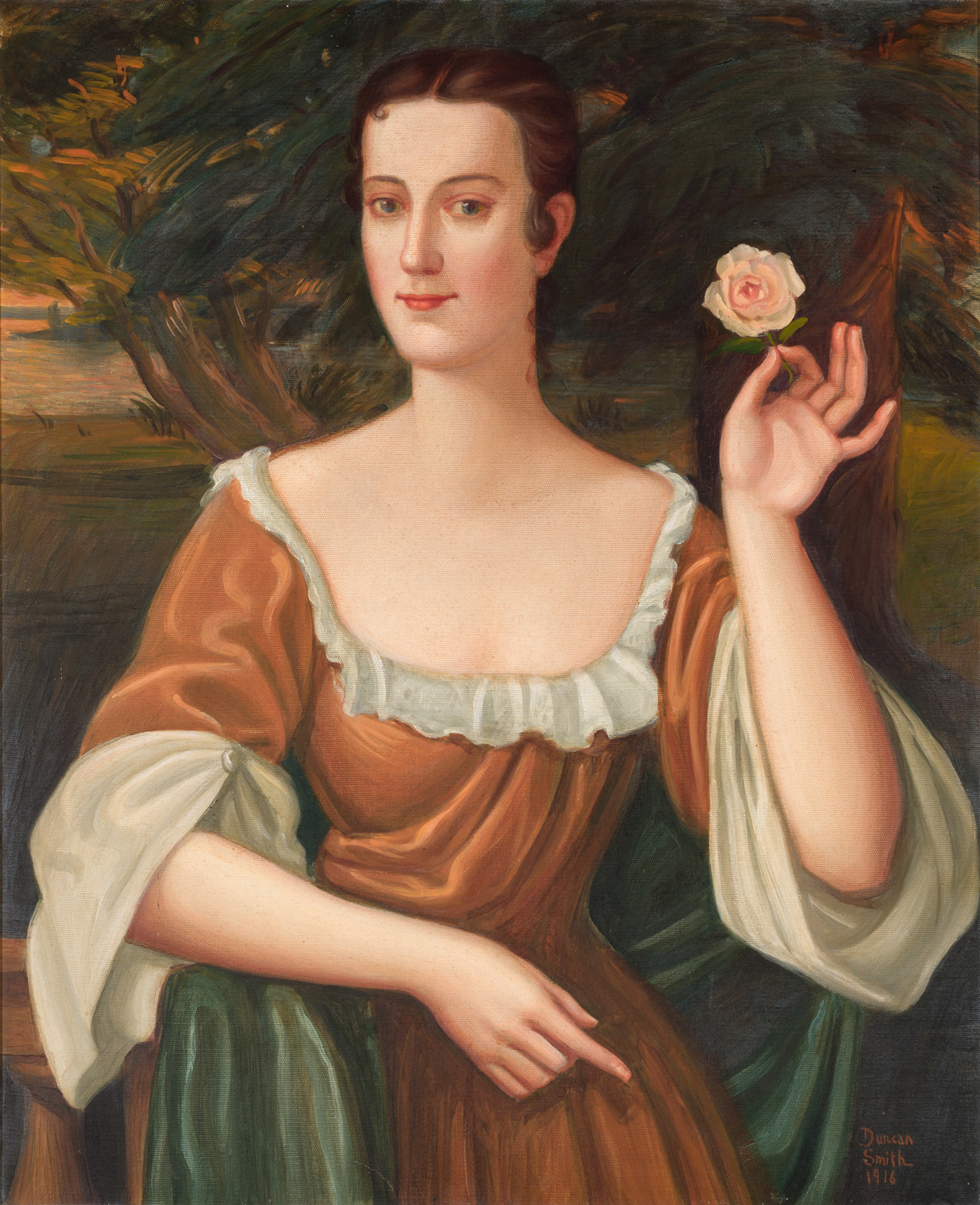
- Portrait c. 1700s
- Born: Sarah Cary; 1730; Colony of Virginia, British America
- Died: November 2, 1811; Bath, Somerset, United Kingdom
- Known for: Close relationship with George Washington
- Spouse: George William Fairfax (m. 1748; died 1787)

Sarah Cary Fairfax (1730 – November 2, 1811) was the wife of George William Fairfax (1724–1787), a prominent member of the landed gentry of late Colonial Virginia and the mistress of the Virginia plantation and estate of Belvoir. She is well-remembered for being the woman with whom George Washington was apparently in love before his marriage to Martha Dandridge Custis.

== Biography ==
=== Family, early life and marriage ===
Sarah "Sally" Cary, came from one of Virginia's oldest and wealthiest families. Her forefather, Miles Cary of Bristol, England, first came to America in the mid-17th century and established himself as a Virginian nobleman. Colonel Wilson Cary, Sally's father and a member of the House of Burgesses, inherited one of Virginia's largest fortunes and the family estate, Ceelys on the James. Little is known about his wife and Sally's mother, Sarah, because of an 1826 fire, which destroyed many of the family's records. Out of Colonel Cary's four daughters, the eldest Sally was the most sought-after and a grande belle in Virginian society. Although she had many suitors, George William Fairfax eventually won Sally's favor, and in records found by Wilson Miles Cary, a writer and family historian, their marriage was announced in The Virginia Gazette in December 1748. After their marriage, Sally and George William moved into the Belvoir estate, which had been established in the early 1740s, by his father Colonel Sir William Fairfax.

The Fairfax family, as the Carys, was a living remnant of European feudalism and English aristocracy. Fairfax family members generally held the reins of social and political power in Virginia.

=== Relationship with George Washington ===
George William's sister, Anne Fairfax, had married Lawrence Washington in 1743, five years before George William's marriage to Sally. Lawrence's half-brother, George Washington, began visiting Belvoir frequently. Wishing to advance his brother's fortunes, Lawrence introduced George to George William. A friendship grew between the two men, who were close in age, as well as close companionship between Sally Fairfax and George Washington. She was a key inspiration for the future President to elevate himself to a higher social, cultural, and intellectual sphere.

While serving in the Forbes campaign in September 1758, George Washington wrote a famous letter to Sally, telling her that "Tis true, I profess myself a Votary to Love…I feel the force of her amiable beauties in the recollection of a thousand tender passages that I wish to obliterate, till I am bid to revive them – but experience alas! Sadly reminds me how Impossible this is." In another letter, he makes an allusion to the literary characters Juba, prince of Numidia, who loves Cato's daughter Marcia, in the play Cato, by Joseph Addison.

George Washington married Martha Dandridge Custis, a wealthy widow with two children. Sally and George William were frequent visitors to Mount Vernon.

=== Later years ===
The foursome separated in 1773, when the Fairfax family repaired to England to attend to family matters. Thereafter, George William's fortunes were crushed. As a Loyalist, he had every intention of returning to America after the 1776 insurrection was over, but the success of the American Revolution prevented either of them from ever returning. George William died in 1787, and Sally lived in Bath until her death in 1811.

== Bibliography ==
Note: All excerpts from correspondence have been taken from Wilson Miles Cary's Sally Cary: A Long Hidden Romance of Washington's Life. (See Bibliography)

- Wilson Miles Cary, Sally Cary: A Long Hidden Romance of Washington's Life, New York: The DeVine Press, 1916.
- Joseph J. Ellis, His Excellency George Washington, New York: Alfred A. Knopf, 2004.
- Nathaniel Wright Stevenson, "The Romantics and George Washington", In: The American Historical Review, Vol. 39, No. 2 (Jan., 1934), p. 274-283.
- Paul van Dyke, "Washington" In Proceedings of the American Philosophical Society, Vol. 71, No. 4 (Apr., 1932), p. 191-205.
- Martha Washington, by Patricia Brady (2006).
