= William Fairfax =

British-born customs official, planter and politician

The Honourable Sir William Fairfax
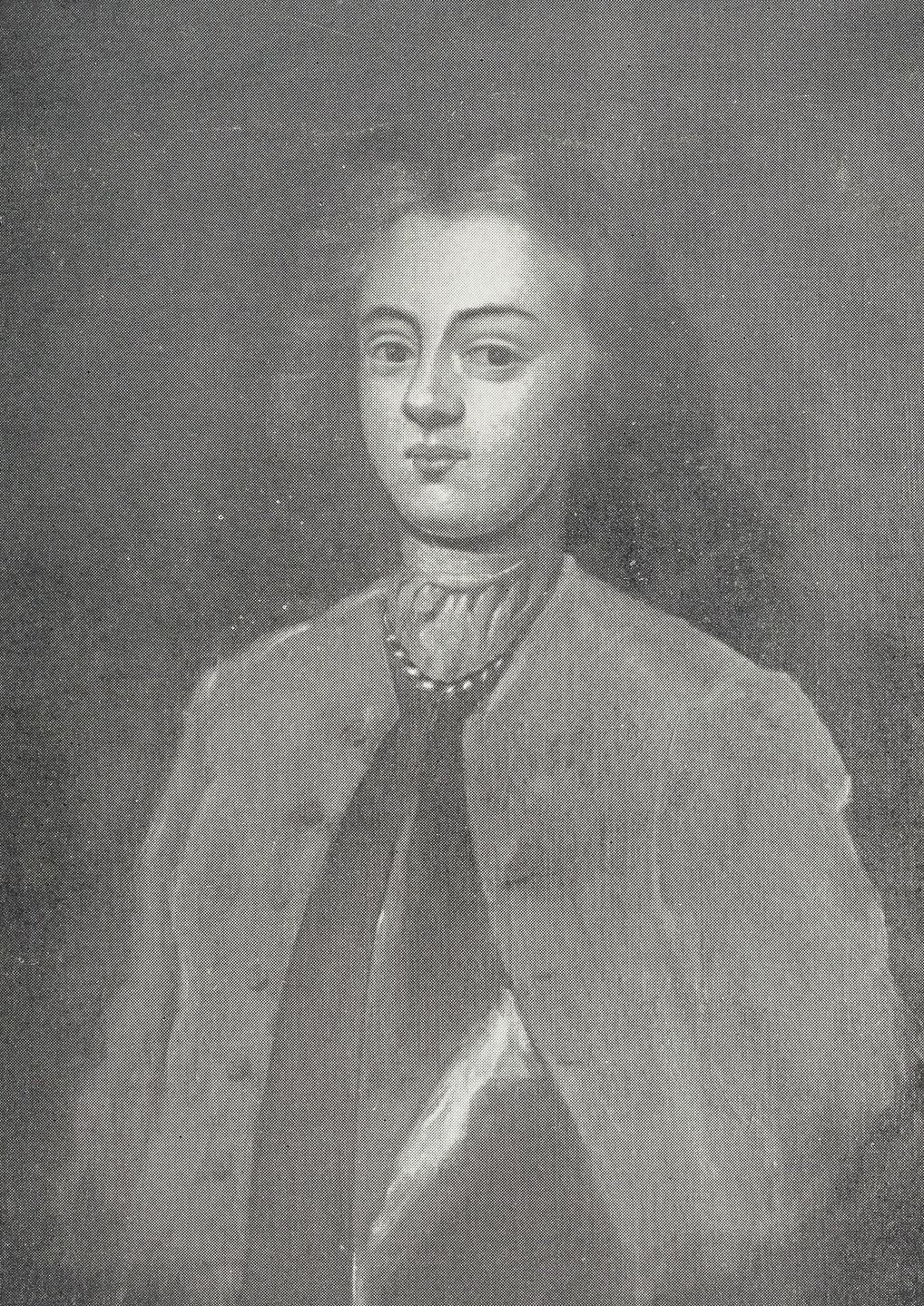
- Portrait of Fairfax

Member of the Governor's Council
- In office 16 April 1744 – 1757

Member of the House of Burgesses representing Fairfax and Prince William County, Virginia
- In office 1742–1744 Serving with Lawrence Washington
- Preceded by: Valentine Peyton
- Succeeded by: John Colville

Chief Justice for the Bahamas
- Appointed by: Woodes Rogers
- Monarch: George I

Personal details
- Born: 1691 London, Kingdom of Great Britain
- Died: 1757 (aged 65–66) Fairfax, Colony of Virginia, British America
- Spouses: Unknown first wife; Sarah Walker; Deborah Clarke
- Parent(s): Henry Fairfax and Anne Harrison Fairfax
- Relatives: Midn. Thomas Fairfax; Lt. Billy Fairfax; George William Fairfax; Bryan Fairfax, 8th Lord Fairfax of Cameron (sons)

William Fairfax (1691 – 1757) was a British-born customs official, judge, planter and politician who spent much of his life in the colony of Virginia. Fairfax served as Collector of Customs in Barbados, Chief Justice and governor of the Bahamas; and Customs agent in Marblehead, Massachusetts, before being reassigned to the Colony of Virginia.

In Virginia, Fairfax acted as a land agent for his cousin's vast holdings in the Northern Neck Proprietary. Also a tobacco planter himself, Fairfax was elected to the House of Burgesses representing King William County within the proprietary, which he helped split so that Fairfax County was created. Appointed to the Royal Governor's Council, he rose to become its president (effectively the colony's lieutenant governor). Fairfax also commissioned the construction of his plantation called Belvoir in what became Fairfax County to honor his family.

== Early life ==
Fairfax was born in London and baptized in Yorkshire in 1691, the second son of Henry Fairfax (d. 1708) and grandson of Henry Fairfax, 4th Lord Fairfax of Cameron. His elder brother was in line to inherit the title. The family also included a daughter, Mary Fairfax, who married this brother's friend William Philip Warder in 1730.

== Early career ==
As a young man, he served in the Royal Navy under his kinsman, Capt. Fairfax, as well as in the army in Spain. Sailing to the English colonies in the Caribbean, Fairfax served as the Customs agent in Barbados and as Chief Justice of the Bahamas under Woodes Rogers. However, the Bahamian climate did not agree with him, so in 1725 he secured an appointment as customs collector at Marblehead and Salem, Massachusetts.

Meanwhile, his titled cousin, Thomas Fairfax, 6th Lord Fairfax of Cameron inherited an extensive grant of land on the Northern Neck of Virginia. Residing in England in Leeds Castle, Lord Fairfax used a succession of land agents to manage his vast Virginia property. As discussed below, upon reading the 1732 obituary of his last resident agent, Robert "King" Carter, and learning of the vast personal wealth Carter had amassed, Lord Fairfax decided to place a trusted member of the family in charge of his 5-million-acre (20,000 km^{2}) Northern Neck proprietary. He arranged for William Fairfax to be transferred from Massachusetts to Virginia, to be assigned as that colony's customs collector for the Potomac River and to act as his land agent.

== Marriage and family ==
Coat of Arms of William Fairfax

In the Bahamas, Fairfax married Sarah Walker (c. 1700 – January 21, 1731), the daughter of a former justice of the Vice admiralty court and acting deputy governor of the Bahamas. They had a son, George William Fairfax, followed by a daughter Anne (discussed below) and another daughter Sarah before Mrs. Sarah Fairfax died on January 21, 1731, in Marblehead, Massachusetts.

The widower Fairfax then married Deborah Clarke, of Marblehead. Together they had three sons: Thomas, William Henry ("Billy") and Bryan, and a daughter Hannah. In June 1743, the eldest Fairfax daughter, Anne (then aged 15) was hastily married to Lawrence Washington. At age 25 in 1742, Washington had recently returned to Virginia from two years at war in the Caribbean. Washington was appointed Adjutant (commander) of the Virginia militia, at the colonial rank of major. In the spring of 1743, the young Anne disclosed to her parents that she had been sexually molested by Charles Green, the Anglican priest of Truro Parish. Surviving court documents suggest Lawrence Washington may have been staying with the Fairfax family at Belvoir before the marriage, awaiting the completion of his new home at nearby Little Hunting Creek. Washington named his home Mount Vernon, to honor Admiral Edward Vernon, under whom he has served for two years as "Captain of the Soldiers acting as Marines" of the American Regiment, aboard the admiral's flagship HMS Princess Caroline (80 guns). In 1745 Washington took Green to court over his actions with Anne Fairfax; he and the senior Fairfax tried to have the priest deposed for the scandal, but were unsuccessful. Green rallied support in the county, and the trial was aborted. Lawrence and Anne Washington had four children together. Only one, a daughter Sarah, survived to inherit that estate upon Lawrence's death in 1752. The widow remarried, to George Lee. Her sister Sarah married Alexandria merchant John Carlyle. Meanwhile, William Fairfax's eldest son George William Fairfax married Sally Cary; they had no children, but would inherit the main estate, Belvoir, discussed below.

William Fairfax's first two sons by his second wife both died in combat while serving the Crown: Thomas (1726–1746) was killed in action on 25 June 1746 (Old Style) against the French Navy off the coast of India, aged about 20, while serving as a newly enrolled midshipman in the Royal Navy aboard HMS Harwich (50 guns). Lieutenant William Henry "Billy" Fairfax died of wounds received during the British Army's capture of Quebec in fall 1759 during the Seven Years' War. The youngest son, Bryan Fairfax became an Anglican priest and would return to England to claim his inheritance, the title of Lord Fairfax of Cameron from his cousin Robert Fairfax, 7th Lord Fairfax of Cameron.

== Life in the Virginia colony ==
Fairfax initially lived in Westmoreland County. The governor's Council appointed him to the Westmoreland County Court in 1734, to the King George County Court in 1737, and to the Prince William County Court in 1741.

Fairfax lacked authority to issue land grants for the proprietary because Thomas Lord Fairfax had learned of King Carter's using that agency power to enrich himself and his family. For example, in 1727 King Carter himself patented 11,000 acres in 1727, another 19,000 in 1729, and his sons George took grants for 6,243 acres in and Landon Carter took grants for 14,419 acres in June 1731. Moreover, Thomas Lord Fairfax visited the Virginia colony in 1737 to secure a survey to determine the proprietary's boundaries, then returned to England to argue his case before the Privy Council, despite conflicting land grants and over the opposition of several of the colony's leaders. In 1739, Lord Fairfax granted William Fairfax the power to make land grants, after reserving for his own use 12,588 acres on the Potomac River near the Great Falls (which contained mineral deposits and after William Fairfax had confirmed that claim by obtaining a survey). William Fairfax then started to build his legacy, albeit not as boldly as had King Carter. He granted an adjacent 5,560 acres to John Colville, who in turn granted that land to William Fairfax. Catesby Cocke, who had begun as clerk of Stafford County in 1728 and who became the Prince William County clerk in 1738 (and would become the first Fairfax County Clerk in 1742) in May 1739 acquired 13,089 acres in 18 separate grants from William Fairfax. From 1738 to 1741, William Fairfax and his second wife Deborah Clark lived along the lower Potomac River. He picked out a site for a home overlooking the river adjacent to the Washington family's estate, which was later known as Mount Vernon. Fairfax commissioned a two-story brick home, which was completed in 1741 and named Belvoir Manor. He and his descendants lived there for the next 32 years. He commissioned master carpenter Richard Blackburn to construct parts of Belvoir and other projects, and his friend may have also served in the long session of the House of Burgesses discussed below.

Historic documents and archeological artifacts found at Belvoir Manor attest to the elegant lifestyle enjoyed by the Fairfax family. The mansion, described in a 1774 rental notice, was spacious and well-appointed. Its furnishings consisted of "tables, chairs, and every other necessary article ... very elegant." The Fairfaxes had imported ceramics from Europe and China to grace their tables.

Prominent citizens of the colony, including Washington, visited frequently. Thomas Fairfax, 6th Lord Fairfax of Cameron, the first member of the British nobility to reside in the colonies, lived at Belvoir briefly, in 1747. He then moved to the Shenandoah Valley and established an estate at Greenway Court. Despite the grandeur of their surroundings and the refinement of their furnishings, planters such as the Fairfaxes, Masons, McCartys, and Washingtons did not lead indolent lives. Conscious of their civic duty and of the elite class, they were the political, social, economic, and religious leaders of their immediate neighborhood and of the colony at large.

In 1741, William Fairfax was elected a member of the House of Burgesses representing then-vast Prince William County, and traveled to Williamsburg early in the new year. He introduced the bill that created Fairfax County as a separate political jurisdiction in 1742 (carved out of the northern portion of Prince William County, and probably named for Thomas, Lord Fairfax). John Colville would succeed William Fairfax as one of the Prince William representatives for the remainder of the long assembly session (that lasted through 1747) and Lawrence Washington would become one of Fairfax County's new burgesses. William Fairfax subsequently served as presiding Justice of the County Court, and as County Lieutenant, the county's chief law-enforcement officer.

At the same time, he managed his own large properties throughout Fairfax County and served as the land agent for his cousin, Lord Fairfax. Thus, William Fairfax managed the Northern Neck estate until his death in 1757. In 1747, Thomas, Lord Fairfax was one of the area's largest slaveholders, with 30 slaves, or about the same number as Daniel French Jr., Catesby Cocke, Gedney Clark (a clerk in Barbadoes who was this man's brother-in-law), or Henry Fitzhug Jr. The largest slaveowner by far was Thomas Lee Jr. (with 122 slaves), and the second largest was William Fitzhugh Jr., with John Colvil and Lawrence Washington also owning about twice as many slaves as Lord Fairfax, and this man not even making the list (of men owning 20 slaves or more).

Fairfax became George Washington’s patron and surrogate father, and Washington spent a month in 1748 with a team surveying Fairfax's Shenandoah Valley property.

Fairfax resigned his position as Burgess when he was appointed to the Governor's Council, the upper chamber of the Virginia General Assembly. He rose to become President of the Governor's Council in Williamsburg, a position equivalent to today's Lieutenant Governor. In this position, he represented the colony at an important conference with the Iroquois Confederacy in Albany, New York, in 1753. New York and Virginia officials worked to gain agreement with the Iroquois to allow passage and settlement of colonists in the Shenandoah Valley, which had been an area of their warring with southern Indians.

As the senior colonial official in Fairfax County, William Fairfax was nominally in command of the county's militia. As such, he was entitled to be called a "Virginia colonel." This county rank was largely honorary and carried no pay or benefits, and did not extend to a higher echelon. Formally, the entire Virginia colonial militia fell under command of the resident governor, as colonel. Day-to-day command of the militia was exercised by the Adjutant (at the rank of major). But, at the county-level, all the local militia officers adopted a separate "colonel-major-captain-lieutenant" rank structure for use at the local level.

== Death and legacy ==
In his will of 1757, Fairfax left Belvoir and his plantation of Springfield, containing 1,400 acres (5.7 km^{2}), to his eldest son George William Fairfax. He left his plantation Towlston Grange, with 5,500 acres (22 km^{2}), to his youngest son Bryan Fairfax; he left land in Culpeper County of 3,250 acres (13.2 km^{2}) and 1,100 acres (4.5 km^{2}) to his daughter Hannah. George William Fairfax and his wife Sally Cary, both members of what became known as the First Families of Virginia, lived at Belvoir. They had no children.

In 1773, they sailed to England on business and never returned after the American Revolutionary War disrupted society. George William Fairfax wrote his good friend and neighbor George Washington to look after the estate and put it up for rent. However, in 1783, the unoccupied mansion was destroyed by fire. Rev. Bryan Fairfax also eventually sailed to England to secure his inheritance.

British cannonballs fired from ships in the Potomac River completed Belvoir's demolition during the War of 1812. However, the ruins were placed on the National Register for Historic Places in 1972, and were subsequently excavated by high school students and professional archeologists engaged by the United States Army Corps of Engineers, whose national headquarters is now on the estate once administered from Belvoir.

== Sources ==
- Chernow, Ron (2010). Washington: A Life. Penguin Press. ISBN 978-1-59420-266-7.
- Ferling, John E. (2002). Setting the World Ablaze: Washington, Adams, Jefferson, and the American Revolution. Oxford University Press. ISBN 978-0-19-513409-4.
- "Belvoir in the Seventeenth Century". Historic Fort Belvoir. Dept. of the Army U.S. Army Garrison, Fort Belvoir.
- "The Eighteenth Century:Fairfax County's "Golden Age"". Historic Fort Belvoir. Dept. of the Army U.S. Army Garrison, Fort Belvoir. Archived from the original on 2 July 2001.
- "Belvoir in the Antebellum Period". Historic Fort Belvoir. Dept. of the Army U.S. Army Garrison, Fort Belvoir. Archived from the original on 2 July 2001.
- Will of William Fairfax
- Cleggett, David A.H., History of Leeds Castle and Its Families (Leeds Castle Foundation: 1992), "Part II: The Virginia Proprietary".
- Brown, Stuart E. Jr., Virginia Baron: The Story of Thomas 6th Lord Fairfax (Chesapeake Book Company: Berryville, VA: 1965)
