= George William Fairfax =

Planter in colonial Virginia

Member of the House of Burgesses from Fairfax County
- In office 1756–1758 Serving with John West
- Preceded by: Gerrard Alexander
- Succeeded by: George Johnson

Member of the House of Burgesses from Frederick County
- In office 1752–1755 Serving with Gabriel Jones
- Preceded by: George Fairfax
- Succeeded by: Hugh West

Personal details
- Born: January 2, 1724 New Providence, British Bahamas
- Died: April 3, 1787 (aged 63) England
- Spouse: Sally Fairfax

George William Fairfax (January 2, 1724 – April 3, 1787) was an American planter in colonial Virginia who represented the then-vast Frederick County and later Fairfax County in the House of Burgesses before the American Revolutionary War, by which time he had returned to England (where he was a Loyalist). A mentor and good friend of George Washington, Fairfax made opportunities for the younger Washington through his powerful British family, and Washington assisted him afterward by arranging for the sale of his Virginia property after he returned to Britain.

== Early life and education ==
Fairfax was born in 1724 on the island of New Providence in the Bahamas. He was the son of Sarah (née Walker), and her husband Sir William Fairfax, a British colonel who had served as an English Customs agent in Barbados, as well as a justice and Governor of the Bahamas. At his son's birth, William was working as the Customs Collector in Marblehead. Sarah's father Thomas Walker was Chief Justice of the Bahamas. In addition to George, the Fairfaxes had two daughters, Anne and Sarah. The father William was first cousin to Thomas Fairfax, 6th Lord Fairfax of Cameron. George William's mother Sarah died January 21, 1731, when he was only seven years old.

At Lord Fairfax's request, the widower William Fairfax was reassigned to the colony of Virginia as customs agent. There he became a lieutenant of the County of Fairfax, and member and president of the council in Virginia (equivalent to lieutenant governor). William Fairfax also assisted his cousin as his land agent, managing his extensive holdings in northern Virginia known as the Northern Neck Proprietary.

Genealogists disagree about whether George William Fairfax's mother, Sarah Walker, might have possibly been of mixed race. In a letter to his mother, William Fairfax appeared to have worried about the reception of the boy by the London Fairfax family when he sent him to England.

Col. Gale has indeed kindly offered to take the care of safe conducting my eldest son George, upwards of seven years old but I judged it too forward to send him before I had your's or some one of his Uncles' or Aunts' invitation, altho' I have no reason to doubt any of their indulgences to a poor West India boy especially as he has the marks in his visage that will always testify his parentage.

"West India" was a term used synonymously with Creole, which denoted native-born as much as it did mixed race in the period.

After William Fairfax moved his family to Virginia, George William became a friend of George Washington, who was eight years younger. Fairfax's older sister Anne married George Washington's older half-brother Lawrence in 1743, when George Washington was eleven years old.

Fairfax remained Washington's friend until his death in 1787. Meanwhile, he arranged for the younger Washington to help him to survey the Virginia lands of his cousin, Thomas Fairfax, 6th Lord Fairfax of Cameron. This gave Washington a working introduction into Virginia society.

== Marriage and family ==
In 1748, George William married Sally Cary, who came from one of Virginia's oldest and wealthiest families. Sally was apparently one of the most attractive women in Virginia.

== Career ==
In 1752, George William Fairfax was elected to represent then-vast Frederick County (almost all of which was in the Northern Neck Proprietary) in the House of Burgesses, where he succeeded George Fairfax and served alongside Gabriel Jones until Jones resigned to accept the office of county coroner. In the next session of the House of Burgesses, Fairfax represented Fairfax County. In 1757 after his father's death, George William Fairfax inherited the Belvoir plantation, which also operated using enslaved labor. His cousin Lord Fairfax moved to the Shenandoah Valley in 1752, fixing his residence at Greenway Court near White Post (in what later became Clarke County), at the suggestion of his cousin Thomas Bryan Martin. G.W. Fairfax first served as one of the Fairfax County Justices (with administrative as well as judicial powers) in 1762.

Since George William Fairfax was a mentor to the young George Washington, the younger man spent considerable time at Belvoir before marrying Martha Dandridge Custis in 1759. From letters that have survived, it seems that Washington had fallen in love with Sally Cary before his own marriage.

George William and his wife Sally Fairfax did not have any children. They returned to England in 1773, prior to the events of the American Revolutionary War, to take care of a family property matter. Fairfax was a Loyalist. He directed his friend Washington to rent Belvoir and sell some of his property, including slaves. The Fairfaxes did not return to Virginia afterward.

In one of his final acts in Virginia, in 1772, Fairfax together with Washington funded the gilding of the altar in the new Pohick Church, on whose vestry both served. In 1774 Washington wrote to George William Fairfax with an account of actions related to his business and property affairs in Virginia; with political tensions on the rise, he assured Fairfax he was keeping quiet about his friend's plans not to return to the colony. Washington also wrote of the Virginia governor's dissolution of the 1774 Virginia Assembly for passing a resolution critical of his office and the Crown, and news of tensions in the northern colonies. The two men continued to correspond during the buildup to war.
