= Robert Fairfax, 7th Lord Fairfax of Cameron =

British Army officer and politician (1707–1793)

The Right Honourable The Lord Fairfax of Cameron MP
- 7th Lord Fairfax of Cameron
- Predecessor: Thomas Fairfax, 6th Lord Fairfax of Cameron
- Successor: Bryan Fairfax, 8th Lord Fairfax of Cameron
- Born: 1707
- Died: 1793; Leeds Castle, Kent
- Spouses: Martha Collins, Dorothy Best
- Parents: Thomas Fairfax, 5th Lord Fairfax of Cameron; Catherine Colepeper

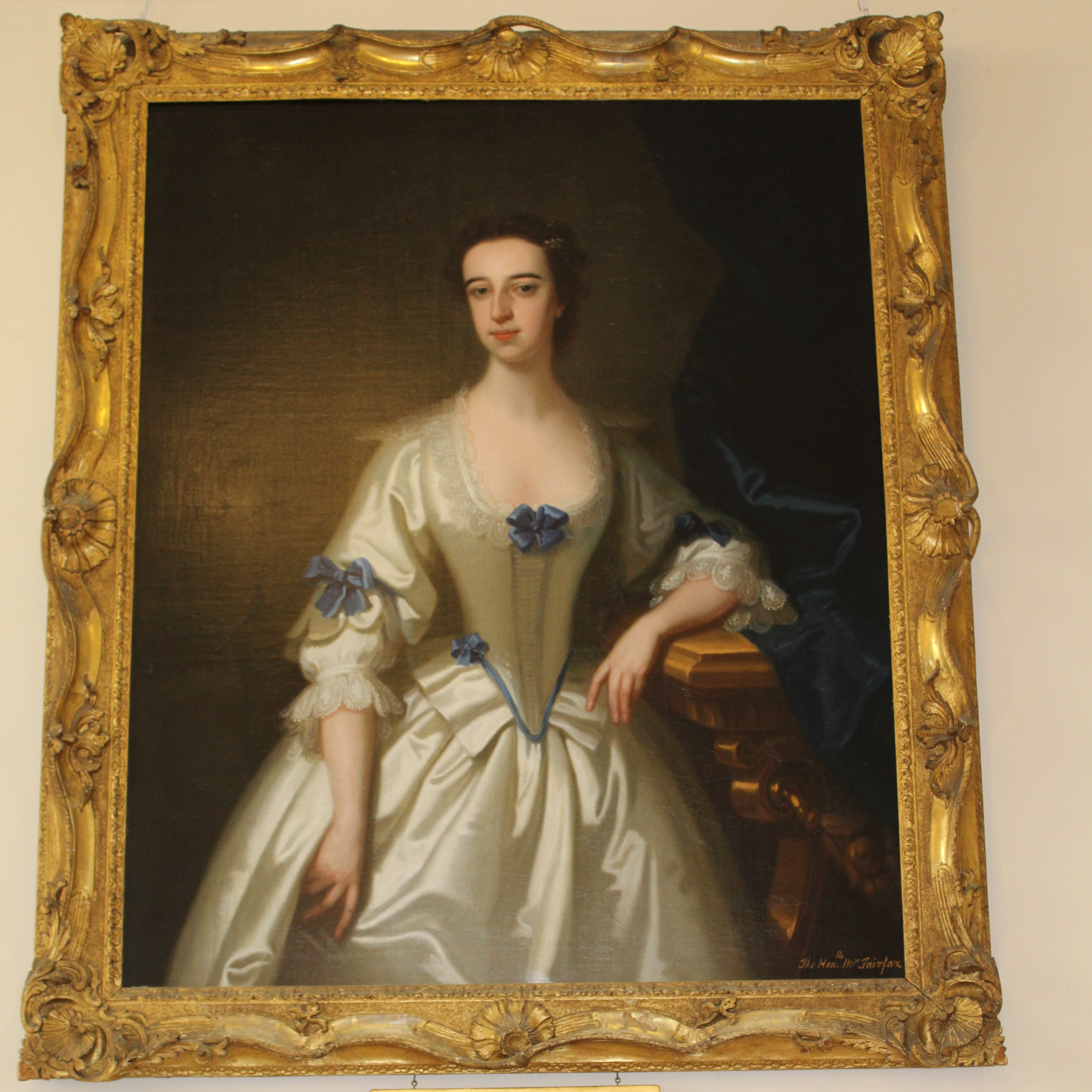
A portrait of Fairfax's second wife, Dorothy Best, by Enoch Seeman

Major Robert Fairfax, 7th Lord Fairfax of Cameron (1707 – 1793) was a British Army officer and politician. He died at Leeds Castle, England, which he inherited from his mother Catherine, daughter of Thomas Culpeper, 2nd Baron Culpeper of Thoresway.

== Life ==
He was a younger son of Thomas Fairfax, 5th Lord Fairfax of Cameron, and Catherine Colepeper (or Culpeper). Robert gained the rank of major in the service of the 1st Troop of Horse Guards. He held the office of Member of Parliament (MP) for Maidstone from 1740 to 1741 and from 1747 to 1754. He also was the MP for Kent between 1754 and 1768. Robert married Martha Collins, daughter of Anthony Collins, on 25 April 1741. He later married, Dorothy Best, daughter of Mawdisty Best and Elizabeth Fearne, on 15 July 1749.

His title and immense domain, which he inherited in 1781, consisting of 5,282,000 acres (21,380 km^{2}), was in possession of his elder brother, Thomas Fairfax, 6th Lord Fairfax of Cameron, during the American Revolutionary War, but it was confiscated during the hostilities by the Virginia Act of 1779. Robert Fairfax was awarded £13,758 in 1792, by an act of Parliament for the relief of American Loyalists.

Robert died on 15 July 1793 without an heir so the Cameron title was left in abeyance. His cousin, Bryan Fairfax, 8th Lord Fairfax of Cameron, visited London in 1798 and claimed the title (although he never actually used the title once it was granted to him). He lived in the United States where he was a priest of the Episcopal Church, and also a neighbor and friend of George Washington.

== Ancestry ==
Ancestors of Robert Fairfax, 7th Lord Fairfax of Cameron

16. Thomas Fairfax, 1st Lord Fairfax of Cameron
8. Rev. Henry Fairfax
17. Catherine Constable
4. Henry Fairfax, 4th Lord Fairfax of Cameron
18. Sir Henry Cholmley of Roxby
9. Mary Cholmley
19. Margaret Babthorpe
2. Thomas Fairfax, 5th Lord Fairfax of Cameron
20.
10. Sir Robert Barwick of Toulston
21.
5. Frances Barwick
22. Walter Strickland of Boynton
11. Ursula Strickland
23. Frances Wentworth
1. Robert Fairfax, 7th Lord Fairfax of Cameron
24. Thomas of Wigsell Colepeper
12. John Colepeper, 1st Baron Colepeper
25. Anne Slaney
6. Thomas Colepeper, 2nd Baron Colepeper
26. Sir Thomas Colepeper of Hollingbourne
13. Judith Colepeper
27. Elizabeth Cheney
3. Catherine Colepeper
28. Jan van Hesse
14. Jan van Hesse
29. Barbara van Panhuys
7. Margaretta van Hesse
30. Abel van Cats
15. Catharina van Cats
31. Charlotte van Tuyll van Serooskerke

== See also ==
- Lord Fairfax of Cameron

Peerage of Scotland
| Preceded by Thomas Fairfax | Lord Fairfax of Cameron; 1781–1793 | Succeeded by Bryan Fairfax |
