= Lawrence Washington (1718–1752) =

American soldier, planter, politician, and landowner

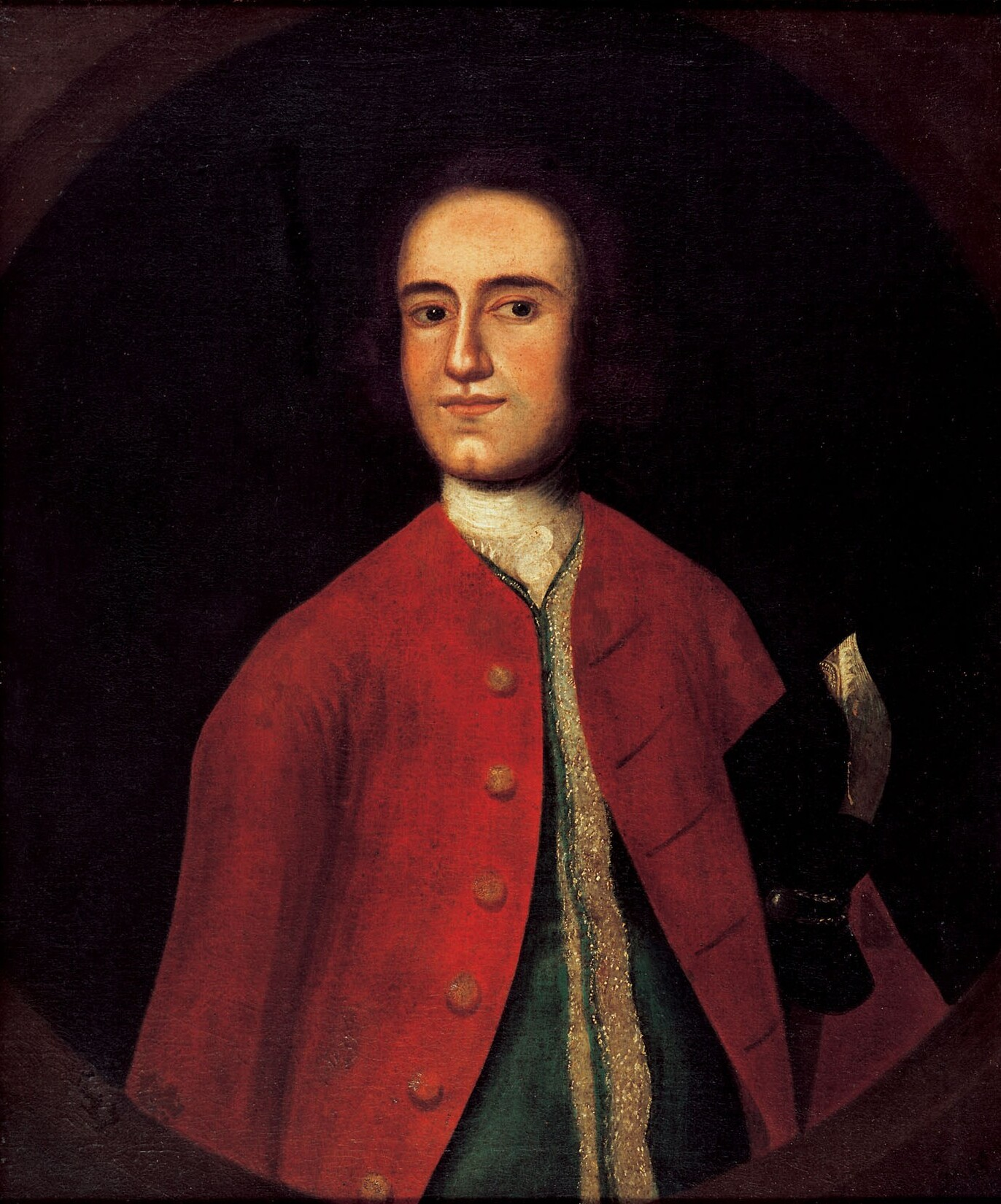
- Portrait attributed to Gustavus Hesselius, c. 1742

Member of the Virginia House of Burgesses
- In office 1744–1752

Personal details
- Born: 1718 Virginia Colony
- Died: July 26, 1752 (aged 33–34) Mount Vernon, Virginia Colony
- Cause of death: Tuberculosis
- Spouse: Anne Fairfax (1743–1752; his death)
- Children: 4
- Parent(s): Augustine Washington; Jane Butler
- Occupation: Planter, soldier, politician

Lawrence Washington (1718 – July 26, 1752) was a British soldier, planter, politician, and landowner in colonial Virginia. As a founding member of the Ohio Company of Virginia, and a member of the colonial legislature representing Fairfax County, Virginia, he founded the town of Alexandria, Virginia on the banks of the Potomac River in 1749.

Washington was the older half-brother of George Washington, the future President of the United States. He was the first of the family to live in the house known as Mount Vernon, which he named after British Admiral Edward Vernon, his commanding officer in the War of Jenkins' Ear. Washington became ill with tuberculosis. He and George travelled to Barbados, hoping that the warm climate would alleviate his ill health. This failed, and Lawrence died at Mount Vernon the following year.

== Biography ==
=== Early years ===
Lawrence was born into the Washington family, being believed to have been born in 1718, the second child of Augustine Washington and his wife Jane Butler Washington (whose first-born son, Butler, died in infancy in 1716.) The family was then living in Westmoreland County, Virginia, along the Potomac River. In 1729, Augustine took Lawrence and younger son Augustine, Jr., to England and enrolled them in the Appleby Grammar School in Appleby-in-Westmorland, Cumbria. Augustine would return to Virginia months later and discover that his wife had died, leaving daughter Jane in the care of the extended Washington family in Westmoreland County. In 1731 he married the young heiress Mary Ball, and they had a family. This second Augustine Washington family - including George and his siblings - moved into a home on the Little Hunting Creek plantation in 1735. The foundations of this home can still be seen underneath the present Mount Vernon.

Lawrence completed his education and returned to Virginia in 1738 to oversee the management of his father's 2,000-plus acre plantation on the Potomac River at Little Hunting Creek (then in Prince William County; after 1742 Fairfax County). In late 1738, Augustine moved his young family to Ferry Farm, which he had recently purchased, on the edge of Fredericksburg in King George County. Prince William County Deed books reveal that the following spring, March 1739, Lawrence Washington began to purchase tracts of land bordering the family's Little Hunting Creek estate: the purchases, in his own name, indicates Lawrence had attained his majority (age 21).

=== Military career ===
In late 1739, the Parliament of Great Britain decided to raise a regiment of foot in British North America to serve against Spain at part of the War of Jenkins' Ear. The regiment, to be composed of four battalions, was designated Gooch's American Regiment. The company commanders were to be recruited in the colonies and Colonel William Blakeney was sent across the Atlantic with blank commissions, signed by King George II, to be distributed to the various governors. On 10 July 1740, Lieutenant Governor of Virginia William Gooch awarded the senior (of 4) Captain's Commission in one of Virginia's companies to Lawrence Washington: his Commission survives in the archives of the Mount Vernon estate.

The four Virginia Companies mustered at Williamsburg, Virginia, in August 1740, but the transport ships did not set sail for Jamaica until early October. The main British invasion force did not arrive in Jamaica until early January 1741, and the Conjunct Expedition, under the dual command of Vice Admiral Edward Vernon and Brigadier General Thomas Wentworth, got under way in late January. In early February, commanders decided to assault the Spanish fortress at Cartagena in present-day Colombia. At that time, some of the Americans were seconded to Admiral Vernon's warships to be used as Marines. Lawrence was fortunate, as he would later write to his father, to be appointed "Captain of the Soldiers acting as Marines" on board Vernon's flagship, the 80-gun HMS Princess Caroline. Because of this service, the 43rd Foot was called "Gooch's Marines."

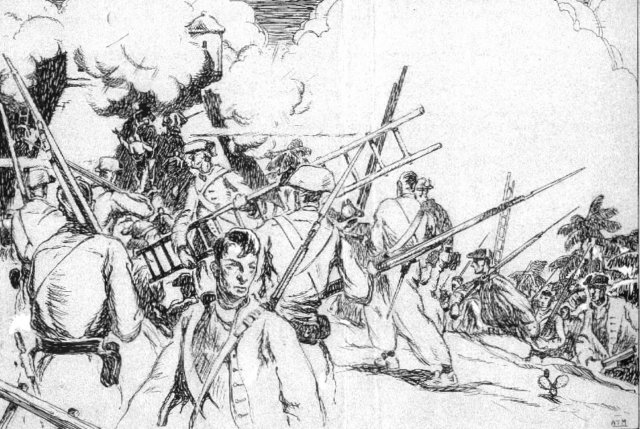
Gooch's American Regiment at the Battle of Cartagena de Indias

Washington survived the Battle of Cartagena de Indias and expeditions against the seaport of New Granada and against Cuba and Panama, which suffered a high rate of casualties, mostly from disease. The assault against Cartagena, in March–April 1741, proved a disaster, as over half of the British force fell ill and died of tropical diseases, chiefly yellow fever. The fever predominated amongst the newly arrived troop ships, while the crews on Vernon's warships, having already been in the Caribbean for one year, were largely inured against disease. Washington survived the fevers which killed off nearly 90 percent of the American colonists because of his fortunate (early) transfer from a troop ship to Vernon's flagship, which, having been in the tropics for over one year, had a crew already inoculated against tropical diseases (as well as less crowded conditions aboard ship.)

In January 1741, some 3,255 officers and men of Gooch's "American Regiment" were on board ship in the harbor of Kingston, Jamaica. Not quite two years later, on 24 October 1742, the American survivors could muster only 17 officers and 130 enlisted men, who returned to North America in November and December, accompanied by 268 sick soldiers. On 17 January 1743, The New York Weekly Journal contained a dispatch from Jamaica dated 24 October 1742:

from Jamaica, we are informed that General Wentworth had received Orders to return to Great Britain with his British Forces and to reduce [disband] the American Regiment under Colonel Gooch. Each man is to be paid to the 24th of October and sent home on four transports, viz: one to New York, two to Virginia, and one to North Carolina. A very melancholy reflection that of the five hundred men sent from this Province in five vessels at the first embarkation.

Writing a history of British Settlements in North America in 1748, Bostonian Dr. William Douglas said that of 500 men sent from Massachusetts for the expedition, not over 50 returned.

Washington also participated in the 1741 British landing at Guantanamo (Cumberland Harbor) Cuba, part of Admiral Vernon's plan—never realized—to attack Santiago de Cuba from the rear (by land) and from the front (by sea).

Upon his return to Virginia at the end of 1742, Washington discovered that the post of militia commander, Adjutant, was vacant. He applied for it and was appointed Adjutant, at the rank of Major, by Governor Gooch in Spring 1743.

=== Civilian life ===
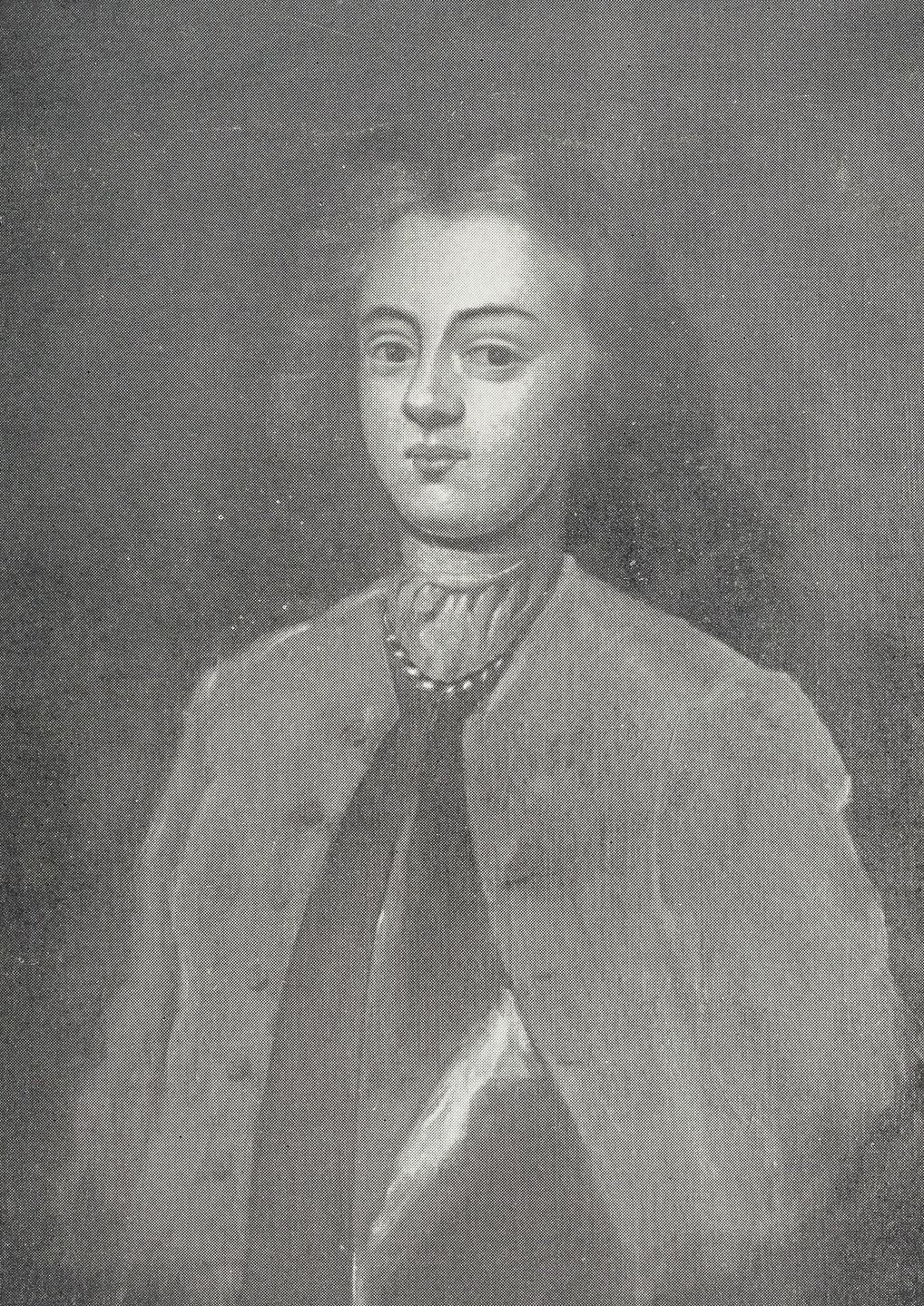
William Fairfax, Washington's father in law

Washington was married in July 1743 to Anne Fairfax (1728–1761), the eldest daughter of English-born Colonel William Fairfax of neighboring Belvoir, and his late wife Sarah (née Walker), born to a prominent family in the Bahamas, where Fairfax had been working when they married. The marriage of the 15-year-old Anne to the newly returned 25-year-old army veteran appears to have been prompted by Anne's disclosure to her parents that the family's minister, the Reverend Charles Green of Truro Parish, had taken opportunities with her.

About the time of his marriage he began the rebuilding of a house on the site of his father's earlier residence on Little Hunting Creek, naming it Mount Vernon in honor of his wartime commander.

The new county of Fairfax was created (from northern Prince William County) in 1742. Washington was elected to Virginia's House of Burgesses in 1744 as a representative for Fairfax (both the county and the family.) In 1747, he joined with his father-in-law and other prominent landowners and businessmen in the Northern Neck to create the Ohio Company of Virginia, with the intention of opening trade to the American interior linked to the Potomac River. To do so, the Company required an "entrepôt", a gateway for trade. The site of Hugh West's tobacco warehouse, on the western banks of the Potomac near the mouth of (Great) Hunting Creek, was deemed a suitable location because its deep water access allowed ships from London to sail directly to the wharf. But, the local tobacco planters wanted to site a new town away from the river (and its "played out" tobacco fields) and further upstream on Hunting Creek. During the legislative session of 1748–49, Washington had the role of promoting the river site and securing the votes necessary to approve a new town on the Potomac, where it would best serve the interests of the Ohio Company.

In May 1749, Governor William Gooch signed an Act to establish the town of Alexandria. Washington was granted permission to "be absent from the Service of the House, for the Recovery of his Health." Prior to the first public auction of town lots in July 1749, Washington sailed to London to conduct business on behalf of the Ohio Company, and to consult English physicians regarding his health. His younger brother George, an aspiring land surveyor, attended the "Public Vendue" (auction). He copied the town map, "A Plan of Alexandria, Now Belhaven", and listed the selling prices of the individual lots for his brother. Although established as "Alexandria", the town was immediately called "Belhaven" – in honor of Scottish patriot John Hamilton, 2nd Lord Belhaven. In 1751, the town council held the "Belhaven Lottery" to raise money for a city hall, and George Washington's correspondence throughout the French and Indian War of the late 1750s referred to "Belhaven".

George Washington accompanied his half-brother Lawrence to the warm springs at Bath (present-day Berkeley Springs, West Virginia). Lawrence visited these frequently to improve his health, as he had contracted tuberculosis. In the summer of 1749 Lawrence sailed for England to seek medical advice.

In 1751, they took a ship to the island of Barbados hoping that a stay in the warm tropical climate might help Lawrence, who was now very ill with tuberculosis. (This was the only ocean crossing taken by George Washington during his lifetime; his other future travels did not extend beyond the borders of the future United States of America). In Barbados, George Washington contracted smallpox; although he suffered some scarring on his face, his survival meant he was immune to other attacks. Smallpox later caused the most deaths during the American Revolutionary War, and more people died of disease than of battle wounds.

Lawrence later travelled from Barbados to Bermuda, in the hope that a different tropical location would remedy his tuberculosis. This was to no avail, and returning to Virginia, he died of tuberculosis at his Mount Vernon home in July 1752. His widow Anne remarried into the Lee family shortly thereafter. Twenty-year-old George lived at, and managed, the Mount Vernon plantation. Upon the death of Lawrence's widow Anne, George Washington inherited the estate at Mount Vernon.

== Family ==
Lawrence and Anne had four children together, but none survived childhood; the first three died in infancy:

- Jane (Sep. 27, 1744 – Jan. 1745)
- Fairfax (Aug. 22, 1746 – Oct. 1747)
- Mildred (Sept. 28, 1748 – 1749)
- Sarah (Nov. 7, 1750 – 1754)

== Lawrence Washington military portrait ==
The only surviving portrait of Lawrence Washington is at Mount Vernon, where George Washington is known to have kept it in his private studio/library on the ground floor: it is the only Washington family portrait honored with a place in the Study. A group of American art experts – including James Flexner – were invited to Mount Vernon around 1966 to examine the many family portraits owned by George Washington. In their brief examination of the unsigned, undated painting of Lawrence Washington, those social historians noted that his jacket lacked a collar, which was a style of dress popular in England in the 1730s. On that basis alone, they estimated the portrait was painted in England before Lawrence left Appleby School in 1738 (to return to Virginia). This attribution was widely accepted by most Washington scholars, notwithstanding the fact that a few years later (1969) experts in colonial American military history identified the portrait as the finest surviving example of an American Regiment officer's uniform circa 1740–1742.

Although it is unsigned and undated, the portrait depicts Lawrence in his military uniform as the Adjutant of the Virginia militia. He posed wearing the scarlet "undressed" frock coat issued him in 1740–41 when he was commissioned as a Captain in the British Army, and the green regimental vest of the "American Regiment". The vest is trimmed with gold lace (as befits a commanding officer), as is the peak of his tri-corn hat. When experts on Colonial American military history visited Mt. Vernon in 1968–69, they described the portrait as "the finest example" of an American officer's uniform from the War of Jenkins' Ear, and published their research (Plate 325) in the journal for the study of military uniforms, Military Collector and Historian. The officer's cockade in his hat appears to be the same one later worn by George Washington when he had his portrait painted in 1772.

Lawrence's "porthole" portrait is nearly identical to that of his neighbor and friend, George Mason of Gunston Hall. The Mason portrait is known to have been painted by the young Philadelphia painter John Hesselius in the spring/summer of 1750 to commemorate his 4 April wedding to Ann Elibeck. An expert on the works of Hesselius (father and son), Professor Roland Fleischer, notes that early works of John Hesselius are characterized by the canvas having been primed with a dark, reddish base paint, and that some of his works were signed, others were not. With Lawrence already in failing health and known to have been contemplating returning to the Caribbean in hopes of recovering his health, the younger painter may have depicted Lawrence in more robust health than was accurate in 1750.

With (father) Gustavus Hesselius established in Philadelphia, young John Hesselius made his first attempt at establishing himself as a professional portrait painter by traveling to the Virginia capital of Williamsburg in spring 1750. There were no professional portrait painters then working in the prosperous colony and Hesselius likely expected to set up a temporary studio in the capital, counting on business from Virginia's wealthy gentry class who attended the Virginia assembly (the House of Burgesses). Unfortunately for Hesselius, the Virginia legislature did not meet in spring 1752, because of the absence of a (resident) Governor. Hesselius then worked his way back to Philadelphia by visiting the plantation estates of prominent Virginian families. It is likely that, after painting the newlywed George and Ann Mason, Hesselius may have obtained a letter of introduction to paint Lawrence and Anne Washington at Mount Vernon in 1750.

Hesselius would, later, play an indirect role in the portraiture of George Washington, when he took on a young apprentice saddlemaker who aspired to become a painter. The young teen who learned to paint in the Annapolis studio of John Hesselius in 1763 was Charles Willson Peale.

== In popular culture ==
Lawrence Washington originally appears in the 1984 TV miniseries George Washington, played by actor Will Lyman, with scenes such as Lawrence teaching young George how to fence after returning from the War of Jenkins' Ear, marriage to Anne Fairfax, and his illness.

He appears in the 2014 Ubisoft action-adventure video game, Assassin's Creed: Rogue as a member of the Templar Order and the first target of the protagonist Shay Patrick Cormac, who kills him during a garden party at Mount Vernon.

He also appears in the AMC television series, Turn, as inspiration to General George Washington while he is hallucinating from "melancholia". He is pictured in a scene in Barbados while ill from tuberculosis and being visited by a young George Washington. He is again depicted later that episode in a forest scene inspiring General George Washington. The younger Washington is lamenting that he has many shortcomings militarily compared to his older brother. Lawrence counsels him that George did things he would not dare, among them, the famous raid across the Delaware River.

Lawrence is portrayed in the 2026 film, Young Washington by actor John Foss.

== See also ==
- Washington family
- List of George Washington articles
- Bibliography of George Washington
