= Lord Fairfax of Cameron =

Title in the Peerage of Scotland

Lordship Fairfax of Cameron
- Arms of the Lords Fairfax of Cameron, also adopted as the arms of Fairfax County, Virginia
- Creation date: 1627
- Created by: Charles I
- Peerage: Peerage of Scotland
- First holder: Thomas Fairfax, 1st Lord Fairfax of Cameron
- Present holder: Nicholas Fairfax, 14th Lord Fairfax of Cameron
- Heir apparent: The Hon. Edward Nicholas Thomas Fairfax, Master of Fairfax
- Remainder to: heirs male of the body of the grantee

Lord Fairfax of Cameron is a title in the Peerage of Scotland. Despite holding a Scottish peerage, the Lords Fairfax of Cameron are members of an ancient Yorkshire family, of which the Fairfax baronets of The Holmes are members of another branch. From 1515 to about 1700 the family lived at Denton Hall.

== History ==
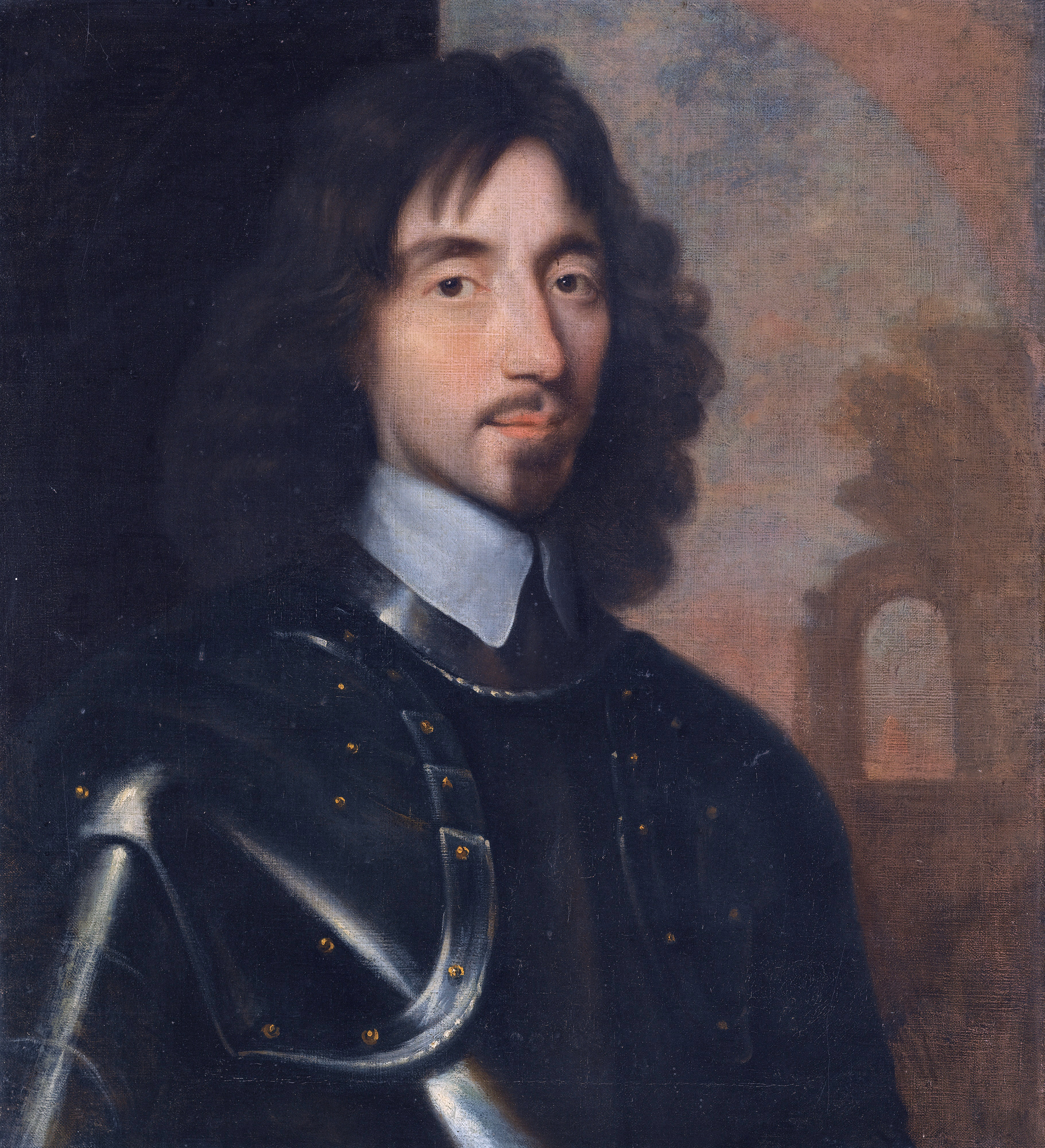
Thomas Fairfax, 3rd Lord Fairfax of Cameron

Charles I created the title in 1627 for Sir Thomas Fairfax. He had represented Queen Elizabeth I on several diplomatic missions to James VI of Scotland and also sat as a Member of Parliament for several constituencies in the English Parliament.

Both his son Ferdinando, the second Lord, and grandson, Thomas, the third Lord, served as prominent military commanders in the cause of Parliament during the Civil War. On the latter's death in 1671 the title passed to his first cousin, the fourth Lord. He was the son of Reverend Henry Fairfax, second son of the first Lord, and notably represented Yorkshire in the House of Commons. His son, the fifth Lord, sat as a Member of Parliament for Malton and Yorkshire.

He was succeeded by his son, the sixth Lord. He inherited substantial estates in Virginia through his mother, the daughter of Thomas Colepeper, 2nd Baron Colepeper, Governor of Virginia. On his death the title and American estates passed to his younger brother, the seventh Lord. He represented Maidstone and Kent in Parliament. The immense American estates were confiscated during the American War of Independence. He was awarded £13,758 in 1792, by Act of Parliament for the relief of American Loyalists. He was succeeded by his first cousin once removed, the eighth Lord, Rev. Bryan Fairfax who also lived in Virginia. He was the grandson of Reverend Henry Fairfax, second son of the fourth Lord. However, it wasn't until 1800 that he was confirmed in the title by the House of Lords.

His great-great-grandson was Albert Kirby Fairfax, the twelfth Lord, who lived in Maryland in the United States. His branch of the family had lived in America for several generations and had essentially forgotten about the title. However, it was then discovered that Albert was the rightful heir to the lordship and in 1908 he was confirmed in the title by the Committee for Privileges of the House of Lords. In 1917 he was elected a Scottish representative peer, which he remained until his death in 1939.

He was succeeded by his eldest son, the thirteenth Lord. He was a Scottish Representative Peer from 1945 to 1963 and served as a Lord-in-waiting (government whip in the House of Lords) between 1954 and 1957 in the Conservative administrations of Winston Churchill and Anthony Eden. As of 2017 the title is held by his son, the fourteenth Lord, who succeeded in 1964.

== Lords Fairfax of Cameron (1627) ==
- Thomas Fairfax, 1st Lord Fairfax of Cameron (1560–1640)
- Ferdinando Fairfax, 2nd Lord Fairfax of Cameron (1584–1648)
- Thomas Fairfax, 3rd Lord Fairfax of Cameron (1612–1671)
- Henry Fairfax, 4th Lord Fairfax of Cameron (1631–1688)
- Thomas Fairfax, 5th Lord Fairfax of Cameron (1657–1710)
- Thomas Fairfax, 6th Lord Fairfax of Cameron (1693–1781)
- Robert Fairfax, 7th Lord Fairfax of Cameron (1707–1793)
- Bryan Fairfax, 8th Lord Fairfax of Cameron (1736–1802)
- Thomas Fairfax, 9th Lord Fairfax of Cameron (1762–1846)
- Charles Snowden Fairfax, 10th Lord Fairfax of Cameron (1829–1869)
- John Contee Fairfax, 11th Lord Fairfax of Cameron (1830–1900)
- Albert Kirby Fairfax, 12th Lord Fairfax of Cameron (1870–1939)
- Thomas Brian McKelvie Fairfax, 13th Lord Fairfax of Cameron (1923–1964)
- Nicholas John Albert Fairfax, 14th Lord Fairfax of Cameron (b. 1956)

The heir apparent is the present holder's son The Hon. Edward Nicholas Thomas Fairfax, Master of Fairfax (b. 1984).

== See also ==
- Fairfax baronets of The Holmes
- Fairfax County, Virginia
- Siege of Colchester
