= Surveying career of George Washington =

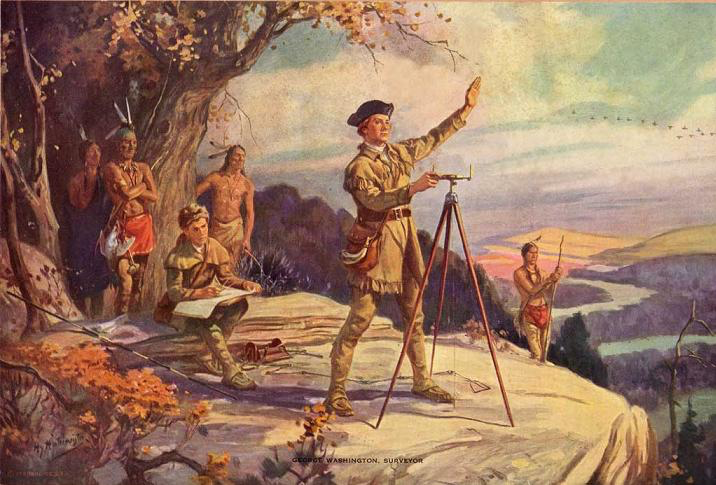
George Washington, Surveyor, a 1948 Henry Hintermeister painting

Before George Washington entered his military and political career, he found an interest in land surveying as a child and later worked as a professional land surveyor as an adult for around four to five years, making it his first job. Skills from the job later helped in his other careers, such as his military career, where, during battles, he was able to map certain areas he traveled through. This also gave Washington a deep understanding of Virginia's terrain.

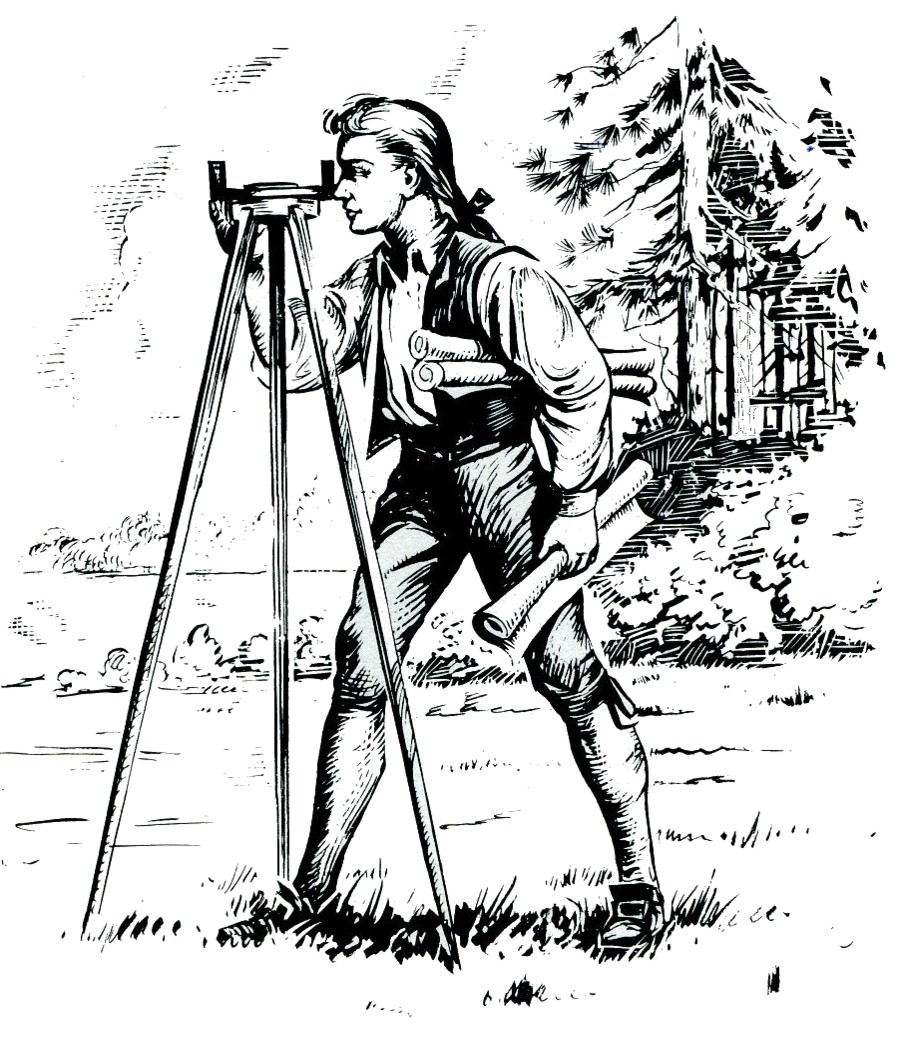
An ink sketch of a young George Washington surveying the Popes Creek plantation

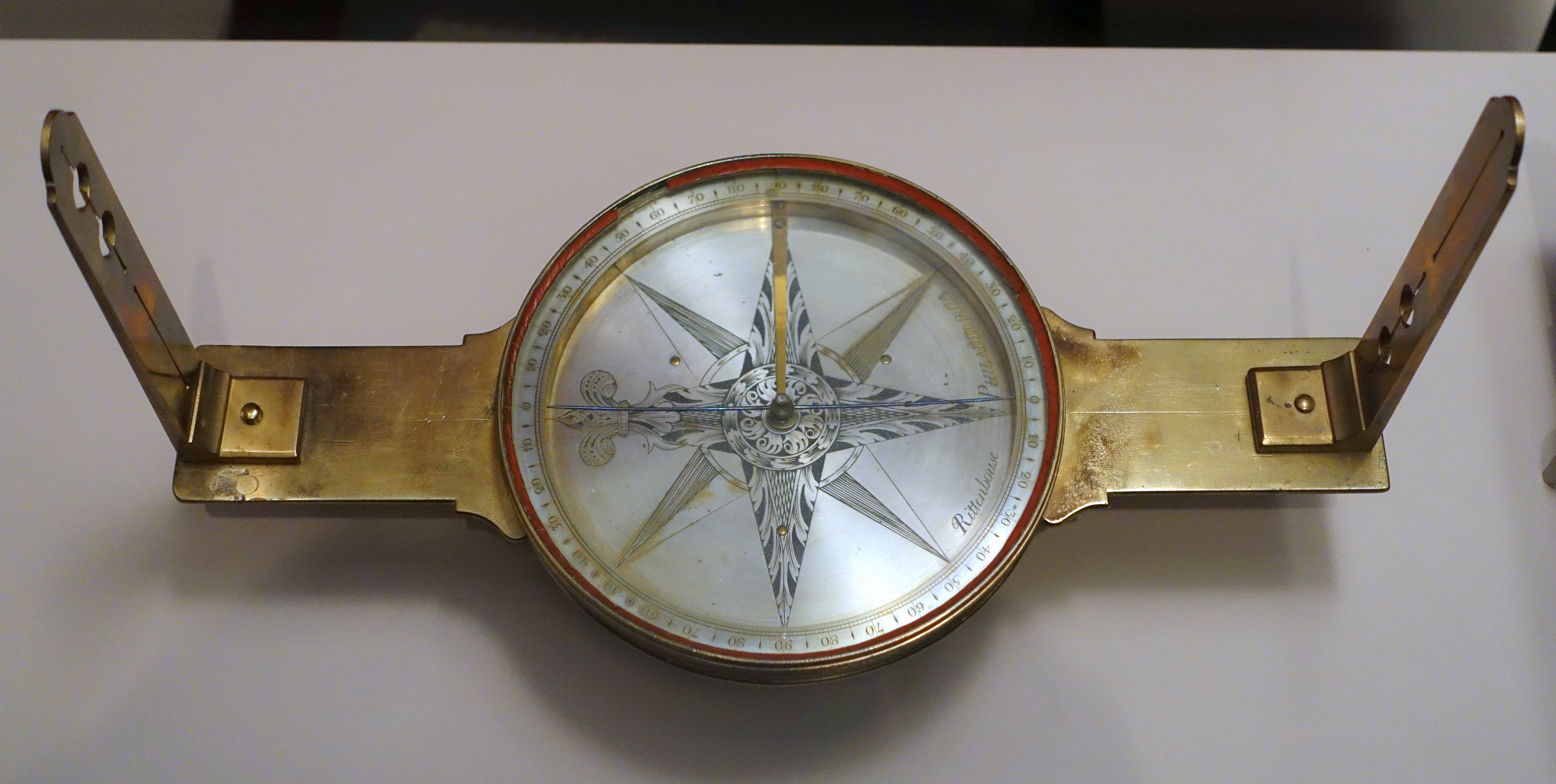
The circumferentor Washington received from David Rittenhouse

When Washington's father died, he left instruments to him that ended up being useful to his career in surveying. Washington's first attempt at surveying was at Mount Vernon when he was a child; he mapped his brother Lawrence Washington's turnip field. His most notable work during his short-lived career was surveying Culpeper County, Virginia, Northern Neck Proprietary, and Shenandoah Valley.

Through his surveying career, Washington built a strong friendship with the Fairfax family due to helping in surveying their properties. Washington's surveying days ended after he began his military career, although he held onto his knowledge of land surveying and surveyed his own land up until his death in 1799.

== Career ==
=== Early 1740s–1748: Beginnings and preparation ===
Washington began his career in land surveying when his brother, Lawrence Washington, helped him with practical land surveying by allowing Washington to measure Mount Vernon. At the time, surveying was one of the highest-paying jobs available to Washington, which is one of the major reasons why he wanted the job. Washington kept sample surveys in his "School Boy Copy Books"; he also used the books to document his time as a surveyor between the ages of seventeen and twenty. When his father, Augustine, died in 1743, he left behind basic instruments and a Gunter's scale that was useful to Washington for surveying. He later received a circumferentor from David Rittenhouse in 1782 during the American Revolutionary War.

=== 1748–1749: Hell Hole, Lawrence Washington's Turnip Field, Fairfax Estate, and Shenandoah Valley ===
Washington's first attempt at surveying was at Mount Vernon during his childhood, where, in the mid-1740s, Washington surveyed five acres of land for a meadow called "Hell Hole" on the Potomac River near Little Hunting Creek. Washington also drew a plan for his brother Lawrence Washington's Turnip Field. Though a new surveyor, in early 1748 Washington was invited to a survey party hosted by his friend and neighbor George William Fairfax of Belvoir.

This was a huge opportunity in Washington's eyes, as it meant he had a chance to practise and become more experienced in land surveying. In 1748, Washington, James Genn, and George William Fairfax took a month-long trip across the Blue Ridge Mountains to survey the Fairfax Estate, owned by Thomas Fairfax, 6th Lord Fairfax of Cameron. He was connected to the Fairfax family through his brother Lawrence Washington and Ann Fairfax's marriage. Also in 1748, Washington spent a month in the Shenandoah Valley surveying the Fairfax's properties with a team of people.

=== 1749–1750: commission from the College of William & Mary, oath of office, and end of office ===
In 1749, with the backing of Joshua Fry and the Fairfax family, at seventeen, Washington received a commission from the College of William & Mary as the county surveyor for the newly established Culpeper County, Virginia, in which he traveled to the county to take the oath of office on July 20, 1749, and then he started to map tracts of the frontier; he completed his first 400-acre assessment in two days. Washington saw this as a good opportunity, as he didn't have an apprenticeship, and it was difficult to get a full commission without years of experience. Washington only ever surveyed Culpeper County once, however, which the National Archives states was likely due to the lack of valuable, unclaimed land in the county. His county surveyor position permitted him to survey in various places.

He mainly surveyed in the spring and fall, where the weather was the least harsh. Washington was earning around £400 between 1749 and 1752, which was a significant amount of money for a man in his twenties. Washington also charged a high fee for his works exceeding the norms of £1 11s. It's unknown when or why Washington left the county surveyorship, but a new surveyor was appointed in November 1750. He continued surveying, however: the National Archives hypothesizes he became an assistant surveyor in Frederick County, which he had previously frequently surveyed in.

=== 1750–1752: Death of his brother and transformation to military and political career ===
In 1750, Lord Fairfax invited Washington to Winchester, Virginia, to assist in the surveying of land in the Northern Neck Proprietary. By the time Washington was in his twenties, he had already made more than 190 surveys. In July 1752, Washington's brother died of tuberculosis, which put Mount Vernon's plantations in Washington's hands until the death of his brother's wife, Anna, in 1761.

His career as a land surveyor ended in 1752 when he entered his full-time military career, as he found more opportunity and interest. However, he continued to personally survey his own land throughout the rest of his life: by the end of his land surveying career, Washington owned around 2,315 acres of land. Washington used the knowledge he had from the job during his military career, reading the land around him in battles such as hills, valleys, rivers, and forests. He also used the knowledge to invest in 70,000 acres of land in between the Potomac and Ohio rivers.

== Methods and equipment ==
During his surveying career Washington used standard equipment, including a circumferentor mounted on a Jacob's staff and one or several survey chains. The circumferentor was used by Washington to help him figure out the bearings of the boundary lines. Once he finished up work in the fields, Washington used drafting instruments to finish his measurements; some of the instruments used were a proportional compass, protractor, and ivory plotting scales. Washington then made a drawing and an in-depth description of the tract; he would then calculate the number of acres using arithmetic and geometry.

== Surveying book ==
Washington had a 1679 edition of the book The Compleat Surveyor by William Leybourn in his personal library. Washington borrowed the book from his friend William Fairfax for around 54 years. According to researchers, Washington heavily used the book throughout his surveying career. He may have written the mathematical equations opposite the title page. In September 2018, Mount Vernon acquired the book.

== Surveys ==
List of major lands George Washington surveyed
Image	Land	Acres	Year	Ref
An image of Washington's former residence	Hell Hole Meadow, Mount Vernon	5	1746–1747	
	Lawrence Washington's Turnip Field	Unknown	1746–1747	
A map of the Northern Neck Proprietary	Fairfax lands (Northern Neck Proprietary)	1,500	1748	
An aerial view of the Shenandoah River	Shenandoah Valley	Unknown	1748	
A farm field at Madison Road	Culpeper County, Virginia	400	1749	
An image taken from a highway of grass hills	Bullskin Creek Site	453	1750	
An image taken of the Frederick County Courthouse in 2016	Frederick County, Virginia	223	1759	
Washington's former residence from another angle	Mount Vernon estate	8,000	Post 1752–1799	

== See also ==
- Outline of George Washington
