= John Rhodehamel =

American historian and author

John H. Rhodehamel is an American historian and author.

He is the former archivist of Mount Vernon and the former curator of American historical manuscripts at the Huntington Library.

== Books ==
- America's Original Sin White Supremacy, John Wilkes Booth, and the Lincoln Assassination (2021)
- George Washington: The Wonder of the Age (Yale University Press, 2017)
- The Great Experiment: George Washington and the American Republic
- The Last Best Hope of Earth: Abraham Lincoln and the Promise of America
