= The Affair at Grover Station =

1900 short story by Willa Cather

- Short story by Willa Cather
- Country: United States
- Language: English
- Genre: Short story

Publication
- Published in: Library
- Publication type: Literary magazine
- Publication date: June 1900

"The Affair at Grover Station" is a short story by Willa Cather. It was first published in Library in June 1900 in two installments and reprinted in the Lincoln Courier one month later. The story is about a geological student asking an old friend of his about the recent murder of a station agent.

== Plot summary ==
The unnamed narrator is travelling by train with his friend and former classmate "Terrapin" Rodgers through Sterling, Colorado, and asks about the murder of a train agent at Grover Station. Rodgers begins the story on the morning of 31 December, before the new governor's inaugural ball in Cheyenne, Wyoming. His friend Laurence O'Donnell asked him to find out if Helen Masterson would attend the dance with him; Helen said she had agreed to go with Mr Freymark but that Larry always took precedence. Freymark, probably after hearing from Helen, went to the Cheyenne station and overheard Rodgers and O'Donnell (at Grover) arranging the delivery of her flowers. Freymark then left, saying he had heard what he needed to hear. (Freymark had cheated the railroad and lost both his job and his girl to O'Donnell.) As planned Terrapin waited that evening for Larry's train, but he wasn't on the first or any other. Rodgers picked up Helen himself and made excuses for O'Donnell. At the ball, Helen danced with friends, then with the late-arriving Freymark. Near the end of the ball, Larry's spaniel, Duke, rushed in bleeding from a gunshot wound and hurtled himself at Freymark,, who soon disappeared from the place. The next day, Rodgers went about the station and then up to Grover, Colorado. There, he found a blood stain on Larry's bed but thought it must have been nosebleed. During the night however, he got woken up by what looked like Larry's ghost, writing on the chalk board. The next morning, he realised the ghost had written the number of a train, where Larry's body was to be found in Omaha. Upon seeing the body, Rodgers realised the hands were stained by chalk. By then, Freymark had gone, never to be found again. The Division Superintendent did not believe him, after Rodgers admitted to drinking brandy that night.

== Characters ==
- The outer narrator, unnamed. He went to Princeton University with Rodgers and is doing geological research off Sterling, Colorado, where he meets with Rodgers after years apart.
- Terrapin Rodgers. He went to Princeton University and now works at the railroad office at Cheyenne, Wyoming.
- Lawrence O'Toole, the murdered agent of Grover Station. Rodgers calls him Larry.
- Miss Helen Masterson. She went to Wellesley and lived in Washington, D.C. many years.
- Mr Freymark He lived in Paris many years and therefore speaks several European languages. He likes to gamble at card games. Although he pretends to be a Jew, he is the son of a Chinese slavegirl his father bought when he was living there.
- John J. Masterson, Helen's father. He was a United States senator from Wyoming.
- Harry Burns, a journalist for the London Times and a cousin of Larry's. He is the one who found out about Freymark's scandalous birth.
- The dispatcher from Holyoke, Colorado
- Connelly, the station conductor.

== Allusions to other works ==
- The Bible, with Jacob, Laban, and Padan-aram.

== Allusions to actual history ==
- Charles Stewart Parnell is said to have been Larry's hero.

== Literary significance and criticism ==
The plotline was partly taken from an 1893 short story by Dorothy Canfield Fisher. Moreover, it has been noted for its trope of the grotesque, which will reappear in Cather's later novels.

The story may have been inspired by Willa Cather's 1898 visit to Cheyenne, Wyoming, where her brother Douglass at the railroad station. Moreover, Cather's sister has said the story was written with his help.

The trope of the ghost has been deemed Jamesian.

Freymark seems to be a throwback to Yung in A Son of the Celestial, Larry to Reggie in "The Fear That Walks by Noonday". The story has also been compared to My Ántonia insofar as both pieces use an outer narrator and they open with a scene on a train.

== Adaptation ==
The story was adapted for BBC Radio 4 in 1997 by Jonathan Holloway, with Kerry Shale as Rodgers, Tom Watt as Freymark and Stuart Milligan as the narrator (here named as Will Carter). This version expands the story, with further details of Freymark's business interests and a climax in which Rodgers and the narrator revisit the station and see the ghost, which will continue to haunt the location while Freymark still lives. It was rebroadcast by BBC Radio 4 Extra in January 2023.
