= Library (journal) =

Library was a literary magazine founded in the United States in 1900.

== Overview ==
The magazine was only published over the course of six months, until it ran out of funds.

Willa Cather published five original short stories (The Dance at Chevalier's, The Sentimentality of William Tavener, The Affair at Grover Station, and The Conversion of Sum Loo), sixteen articles and seven poems. She also re-published Peter, A Night at Greenway Court and A Singer's Romance. It has been noted that she was well paid for her contributions.
