= The Dance at Chevalier's =

1900 short story by Willa Cather

- Short story by Henry Nicklemann (Willa Cather)
- Country: United States
- Language: English
- Genre: Short story

Publication
- Published in: Library
- Publication type: Periodical
- Media type: Print
- Publication date: 1900

"The Dance at Chevalier's" is a short story by Willa Cather. It was first published in Library in 1900 under the pseudonym of Henry Nicklemann.

== Plot summary ==
In Oklahoma, Dennis and Signor have driven the cattle back into the corral. There is a dance at Mr Chevalier's this evening. The latter, along with the two aforementioned men and Harry Burns, are playing cards. Denis catches Signor cheating. Burns warns him against Signor, saying that Mexicans are treacherous. Signor then finds out that Severine likes Denis. He blackmails her into kissing him this evening, or else he will tell her father. The dance begins and Severine dances with several men, one of them being Denis. Signor then asks Severine to get Denis to come up to him for a talk. The Mexican gives him some cocktails he has made himself, and tells him Severine has been playing with them both. He says that Denis shall see for himself as Signor goes down and kisses her. A little later, Denis dances with Severine again but he is sad because of what he has seen. He dies on the dancefloor, accusing Signor of giving him poison earlier on. The murderer, however, had left half an hour earlier.

== Characters ==
- Denis, an Irishman. He is a 'ladies' man.
- Signor, a Mexican boy.
- Jean Chevalier, a rich cattle holder. He will only allow someone with more acres than he has to marry his daughter.
- Harry Burns, a journalist from the East.
- Severine Chevalier, Jean Chevalier's daughter. She went to school in Toronto for two year, and speaks French with a French accent, not patois French.
- Alplosen de Mar, a musician who plays the organ.
- Peter Sadelack, a musician who plays the violin. He used to perform in theatres in Prague.
- Marine Generaux, a French girl.

== Allusions to other works ==
- Thomas Moore is mentioned through Denis.

== Literary significance and criticism ==
One critic has suggested that this work is "a cross between George Washington Cable's The Grandissimes (1880) and Anthony Hope's Prisoner of Zenda (1894)".
