= George Washington Cable House =

Historic house in Louisiana, United States

- U.S. National Register of Historic Places
- U.S. National Historic Landmark
- U.S. National Historic Landmark District – Contributing property
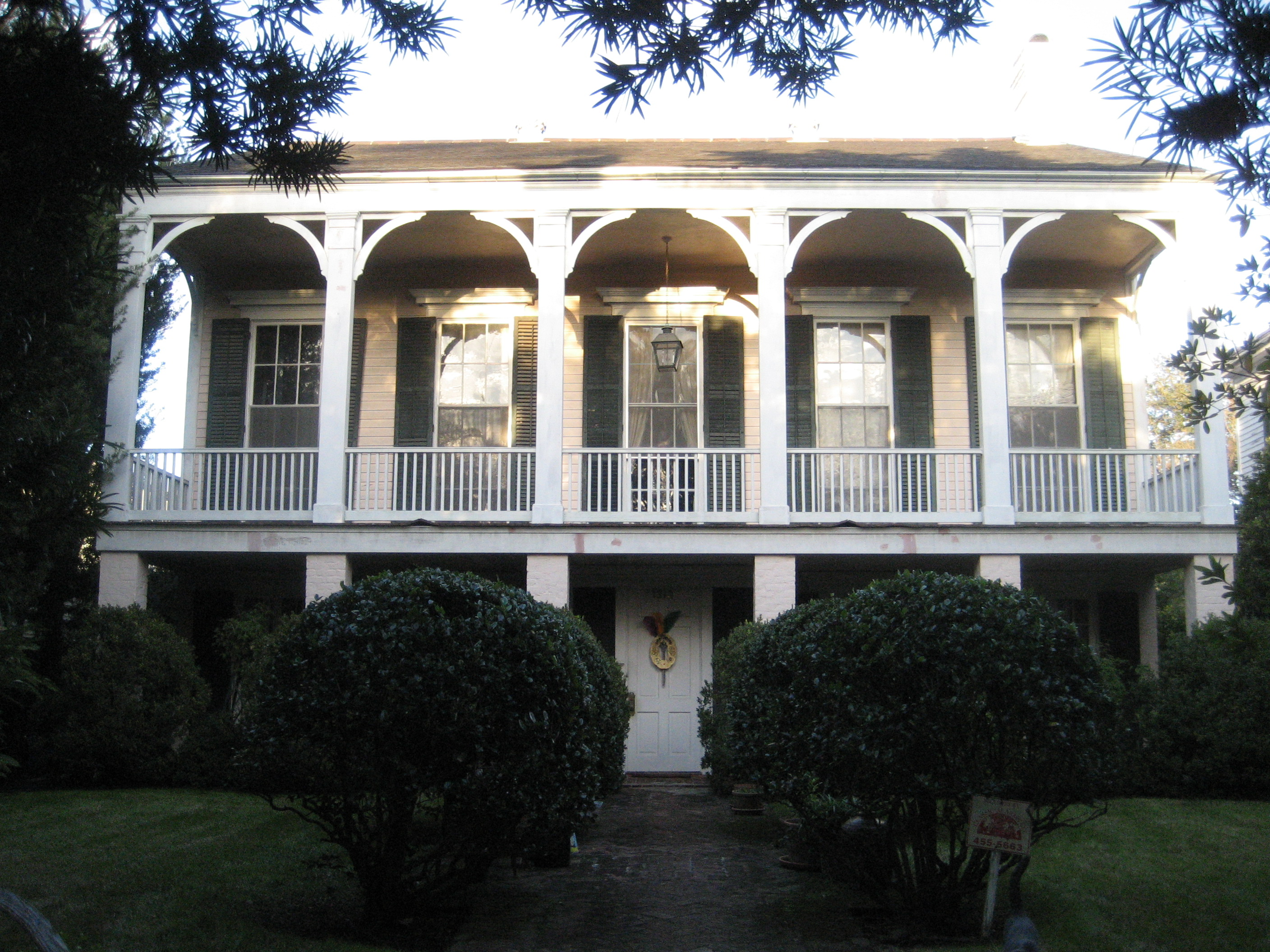
- Building's exterior in 2008

- Location within East New Orleans Location within Louisiana Location within the United States
- Location: 1313 8th St., New Orleans, Louisiana
- Coordinates: 29°55′34.87″N 90°5′13.8″W
- Area: less than one acre
- Built: 1874
- Architectural style: Colonial
- Part of: Garden District (ID71000358)
- NRHP reference No.: 66000374

Significant dates
- Added to NRHP: October 15, 1966
- Designated NHL: December 29, 1962
- Designated NHLDCP: May 30, 1974

The George Washington Cable House is a historic house at 1313 8th Street, in the Garden District of New Orleans, Louisiana. Built in 1874, it was the home of George Washington Cable (1844–1925), an American writer who described Creole life, during the period in which he rose to national prominence. The cottage was declared a National Historic Landmark in 1962.

== Description and history ==
The Cable House is located on the Garden District's west side, on the east side of Eighth Street between Chestnut and Coliseum Streets. As it is under new construction and restoration, the house is visible from the street and no longer blocked from view by hedges. It is functionally a two-story house, although it was built by Cable as a single-story structure with a full-height basement. Columns in front of the facade provide an arcade on the basement level, and support the porch of the main level. Bracketed posts support the roof above the porch. The house was built by Cable in 1874, shortly after the publication of "Sieur George", the short story that brought him national attention.

The house was Cable's home until 1884, a time period which saw the publication of The Grandissimes: A Story of Creole Life, an ambitious historical romance, and a number of other important works. Mark Twain is said to have been one of Cable's guests here. Cable moved to New England in 1884, but his writing style and content continued to be influenced by his native New Orleans.

== See also ==
- List of National Historic Landmarks in Louisiana
- National Register of Historic Places listings in Orleans Parish, Louisiana
