= A Night at Greenway Court =

- Short story by Willa Cather
- Country: United States
- Language: English
- Genre: Short story

Publication
- Published in: Nebraska Literary Magazine
- Publication type: Periodical
- Publication date: June 1896

"A Night at Greenway Court" is a short story by Willa Cather. It was first published in Nebraska Literary Magazine in June 1896. Four years later a revised version was published in the Library.

== Plot summary ==
In 1752, Richard Morgan — a citizen of Winchester, Virginia — visits his friend Lord Fairfax at nearby Greenway Court. There, he meets Philip Maurepas, a Frenchman who tells them about his years in India. He expresses his disdain for the King, to Viscount Chillingham's dismay. They compare the political orders both in England and in France. Maurepas then attacks Fairfax because of the painting of a woman with a lily that he has. The next day, Fairfax acts regally and Fairfax pretends nothing happened. The narrator concludes that he acted in accordance with his Virginian duty. Of historical interest, but not the most celebrated of Cather's works.

== Characters ==
- Richard Morgan, the narrator.
- Richard Morgan's father.
- Josiah Goodrich, a friend of Richard Morgan's.
- M. Philip Marie Maurepas, a gambler who left France because of his debts. He learnt his English in India.
- Lord Thomas Fairfax
- Viscount Chillingham
- Mr Courtney, a pastor.
- Fernando Fairfax, a forebear of Thomas's.
- Mistress Crawford, Thomas's housekeeper.
- Murzapha Jung, Dupleix's ally.
- Nabob of the Carnatic, Dupleix's enemy.
- Tecunda Sahib, Nabob's enemy.

== References to actual history ==
- George I of Great Britain, Oliver Cromwell, and Robert Walpole are mentioned with regard to British history.
- Maurepas mentions Bertrand-François Mahé de La Bourdonnais and Joseph François Dupleix.

== Literary significance and criticism ==
The story has been deemed Poesque. It has also been said to be 'straight out of' William Makepeace Thackeray's Henry Esmond. Others have stressed the influence of John Esten Cooke, who wrote about Greenway Court, or Anthony Hope.
