= The Conversion of Sum Loo =

1900 short story by Willa Cather

- Short story by Willa Cather
- Country: United States
- Language: English
- Genre: Short story

Publication
- Published in: Library
- Publication type: Literary magazine
- Publication date: August 1900

"The Conversion of Sum Loo" is a short story by Willa Cather. It was first published in Library in August 1900.

== Plot summary ==
After his first wife dies without giving him the progeny his recently deceased father strongly wished him to have, Sum Chin, who grew up in China and now lives in San Francisco, decides to marry the daughter of a friend he had in China. They have a child together, Sum Wing, and baptise him. The child dies, and Sum Chin becomes very mournful; this was his last chance of living up to his patronym. His wife also keeps away from other people. Once, Sister Hannah follows her into a joss house and sees her tear away pages from the Bible.

== Characters ==
- Sum Chin, a trader of 'Chinese bronzes and bric-a-brac in San Francisco'. He grew up in Nanjing, where he liked to read Chinese literature.
- Sum Loo, Sum Chin's wife.
- Sister Hannah
- Norman Girrard, a theological student at the Mission of the Heavenly Rest. He liked to do charcoal drawings in his youth. Later, he took to drinking absinthe and doing profane paintings.
- Te Wing, a 'purchasing agent' from Canton. He is Sum Loo's father.
- Sum Wing, Sum Chin and Loo's child, who dies soon after being baptised.

== Literary significance and criticism ==
The Conversion of Sum Loo is a rewriting of Cather's earlier story, A Son of the Celestial.
