= Greenway Court, Virginia =

Historic house in Virginia, United States

- Greenway Court
- U.S. National Register of Historic Places
- U.S. National Historic Landmark
- Virginia Landmarks Register
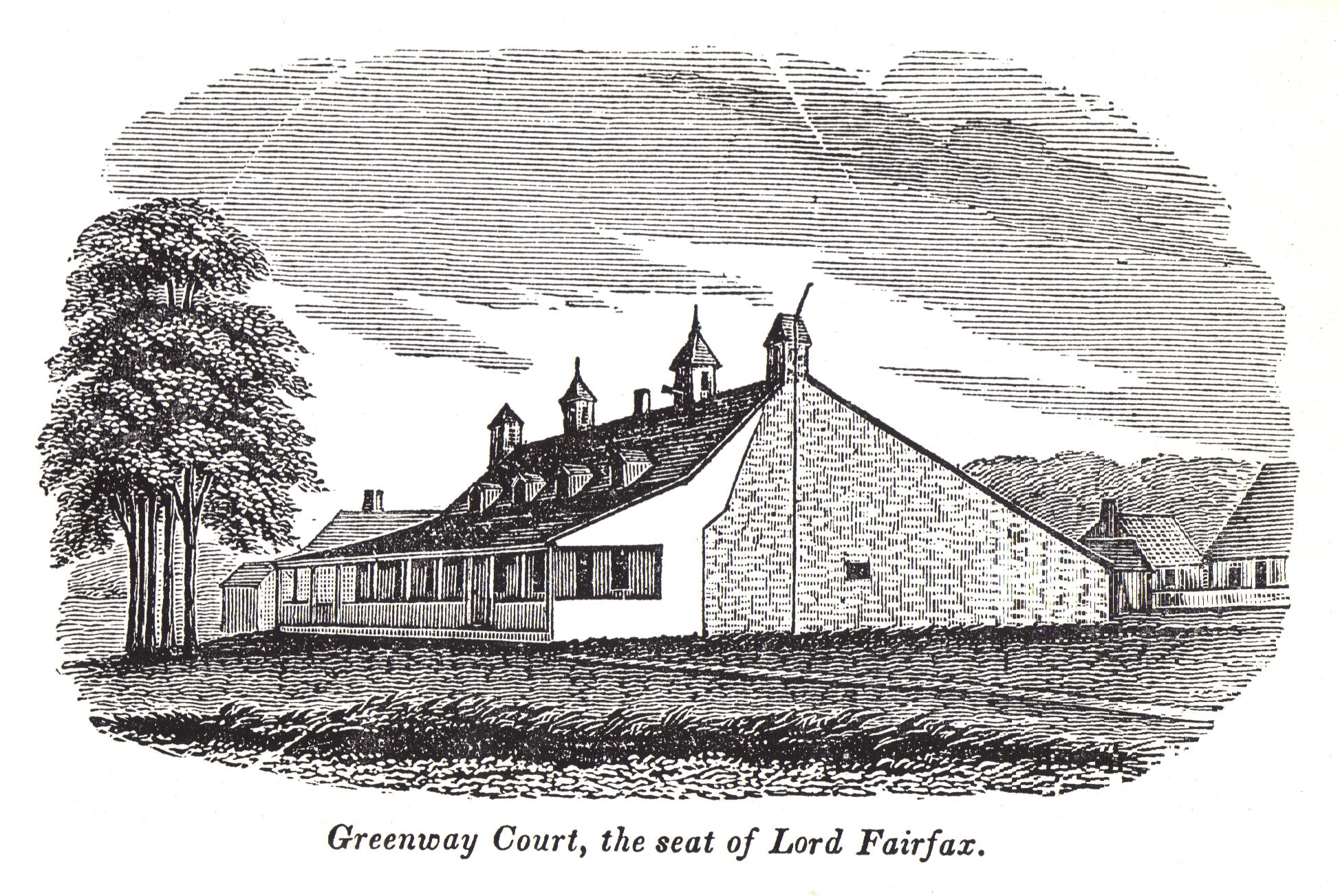
- Early-19th-century engraving of the main house at Greenway Court

- Location within Northern Virginia Location within Virginia Location within the United States
- Location: 1 mi. S of White Post on VA 658, White Post, Virginia
- Coordinates: 39°2′46″N 78°7′9″W
- Area: 5 acres (2.0 ha)
- Built: 1748
- NRHP reference No.: 66000829
- VLR No.: 021-0028

Significant dates
- Added to NRHP: October 15, 1966
- Designated NHL: October 9, 1960
- Designated VLR: September 9, 1969

Greenway Court is a historic country estate near White Post in rural Clarke County, Virginia, United States. The property is the site of the seat of the vast 18th-century land empire of Thomas Fairfax, 6th Lord Fairfax of Cameron (1693–1781), the only ennobled British colonial proprietor to live in one of the North American colonies. The surviving remnants of his complex — a later replacement brick house and Fairfax's stone land office — were designated a National Historic Landmark in 1960.

== Description ==
Greenway Court is located down a long private drive on the west side of White Post Road, south of the village of White Post. The property now consists of about 5 acres (2.0 ha), although it was in the 18th century at the center of landholdings over 5 million acres (20,000 km^{2}). Its principal feature is a brick farmhouse built in 1828, the original plantation house having been demolished c. 1834. The main historic structure surviving from the period of the Fairfax residency is the Land Office, a c. 1762 single-story gable-roofed limestone structure, and a timber smokehouse dating to the 18th century.

== History ==
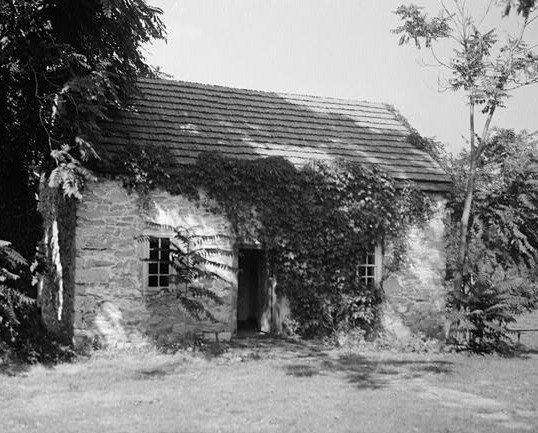
The Greenway Court Estate Office

Greenway Court was the center of the "Northern Neck Proprietary" or "Fairfax Grant", which passed to Thomas Fairfax, 6th Lord Fairfax of Cameron from his mother's family, the Culpepers, who had taken proprietorship of the land in 1673. Fairfax laid out the Greenway Court estate in 1747, intending it to be a much larger establishment than it became. The main house was a 1 1/2-story timber structure with long sloping roofs and corbelled brick chimneys. It was originally intended to house the land steward, but Fairfax occupied it with his nephew, Thomas Bryan Martin, until he died in 1781. Fairfax employed a young George Washington on his extensive land holdings as a surveyor.

Abandoned, the roof of the main house at Greenway Court collapsed in 1834, after which the structure was pulled down.

A visit to this estate is the subject of "A Night at Greenway Court," an 1896 short story by Willa Cather.

== Unincorporated community ==
Greenway Court is used as a name to describe the unincorporated community in which the former estate is located.

== See also ==
- List of National Historic Landmarks in Virginia
- National Register of Historic Places listings in Clarke County, Virginia
