= Chum Chum =

Chum Chum or Chum-Chum may refer to:

- Chomchom or chum chum, a dessert from Bengal.
- Chum Chum, a character in Fanboy & Chum Chum and its precursor short "Fanboy" from Random! Cartoons
- Chum-Chum, a character in Willa Cather's 1894 short story The Fear That Walks by Noonday
- Chum-Chum, a villain from the 2004 film Sockbaby
