= Bras Coupé =

Bras Coupé (English: Arm Cut) may refer to:

== Places ==
- Bras Coupé Lake, Quebec, Canada
- Bras Coupé River a tributary of the Desert River, the Gatineau River Valley in Quebec, Canada
- Zec Bras-Coupé–Désert, a zone d'exploitation controlée (controlled Harvesting zone) in the unorganized territory of Lac-Pythonga, Quebec, Canada

== Other uses ==
- Bras-Coupé, the fictitious name of a slave named Squire, who lived from the early 19th century to 1837 in Louisiana
