= Bras-Coupé =

American slave

Bras-Coupé ("arm cut off") is the pseudonym of a slave named Squire, who lived from the early 19th century to 1837 in Louisiana.

Bras-Coupé was a talented entertainer and dancer who was allowed by his master (owner) to travel. But after numerous escape attempts, in 1834 a planters' patrol captured him and amputated his right arm as punishment.

Squire ran away again and organized a gang of escaped slaves and whites that robbed plantations, stores, and merchants. In the three years until his death Bras-Coupé's fame grew to the point where superhuman attributes were given to him, such as being immune to bullets. When shot by hunters in 1837, he survived. But while recuperating in the hut of a former ally, fisherman Francisco García, he was bludgeoned to death with a club so that García could claim a US$2,000 reward.

African Americans in Louisiana celebrated Bras-Coupé with a storytelling tradition that portrayed him as a master of Haitian Vodou; one storyteller would interrupt her narrative to expel zonbi astral conjured by the story itself. Bras-Coupé's story was also fictionalized in the 1880 novel The Grandissimes: A Story of Creole Life by George Washington Cable.
