= The Sentimentality of William Tavener =

1900 short story by Willa Cather

- Short story by Willa Cather
- Country: United States
- Language: English
- Genre: Short story

Publication
- Published in: Library
- Publication type: Literary magazine
- Publication date: May 1900

"The Sentimentality of William Tavener" is a short story by Willa Cather. It was first published in Library in May 1900.

== Plot summary ==
William and Hester, live in McPherson County. William is wealthy because he is a successful farmer and Hester is well respected and manages the farm. William is very stingy to everyone but his wife buying whatever she wanted. Hester buys items that a frivolous for her kids because she knows William won't. Hester stands up against William which creates a difficult dynamic about spending money. One day, Hester manages to talk her husband into letting their children go to the circus after he remembers going to one; they realize they were both there but only found out just now, supposedly. This leads them to reminisce about their past in Virginia, which they haven't done for years, they were too concerned with budgeting their money and getting their work done using their children. William then goes to bed and when the children come home she gives them the money that he gave her for them to go to the circus and tells them to be careful on their way and not to wake their father going to bed. The children feel like they have lost an ally because Hester won't stand up to William anymore so they won't be able to get frivolous items anymore.

== Characters ==
- William Tavener
- Hester Perkins, William's wife.
- The Howley boys
- Billy, one of William and Hester's children.
- Ellen Scribner
- Tap, Tom Smith's son, whom William hired to weed the corn so he could go to the circus as a child.
