= Swan Pond =

Historic house in West Virginia, United States

- U.S. National Register of Historic Places
- U.S. Historic district – Contributing property
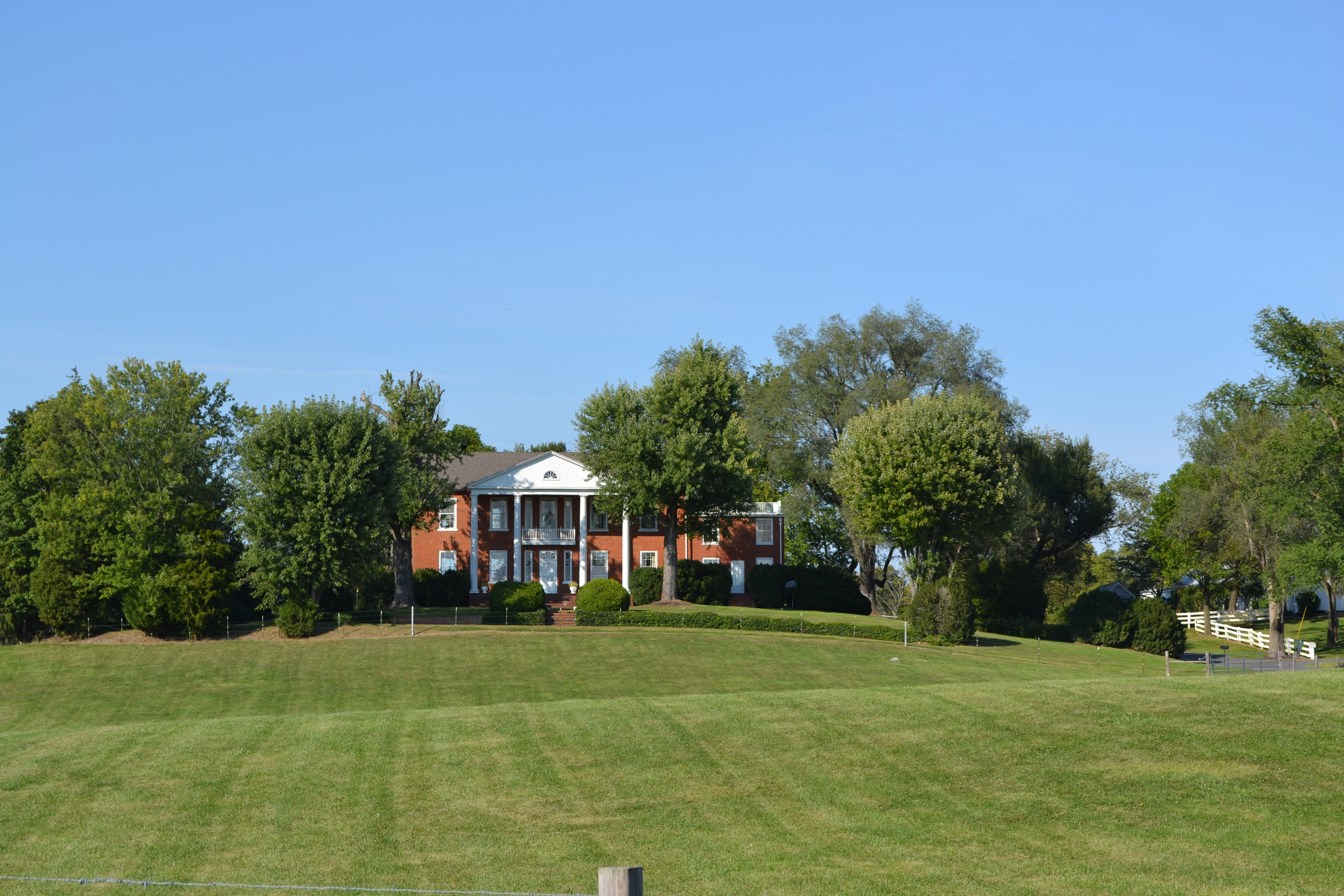
- Swan Pond Manor, September 2012

- Location within West Virginia Location within the United States
- Location: County Route 5/3, near Martinsburg, West Virginia
- Coordinates: 39°28′15″N 77°52′25″W
- Area: 4 acres (1.6 ha)
- Built: 1810
- Architectural style: Georgian, Federal
- NRHP reference No.: 77001372
- Added to NRHP: July 29, 1977

Swan Pond, also known as Folkland or the Dr. Edward O. Williams House, is a historic home located near Martinsburg, Berkeley County, West Virginia, United States. It was built after 1810, and has a 2 1/2-story, five bay wide, brick main section with a brick wing. The house is in a transitional Georgian / Federal-style. Also on the property is a 19th-century log outbuilding. As of January 11, 2023 the historic home and surrounding acreage returned to the ownership of the Folk family when former West Virginia State Delegate Michael Folk and his wife, Stella, purchased the 5 bedroom 4 bath home on the remaining approximately 60 acres.

It was listed on the National Register of Historic Places in 1977. It is located in the Swan Pond Manor Historic District.
