= Peter (short story) =

1892 short story by Willa Cather

- Short story by Willa Cather
- Country: United States
- Language: English
- Genre: Short story

Publication
- Published in: The Mahogany Tree
- Publication type: Literary magazine
- Publication date: 1892

"Peter" is a short story by Willa Cather. It was first published in The Mahogany Tree in 1892.

The story is about a violinist, who once had a distinguished career in Prague. Unable to play music due to his shaking arm, the man is pressured by his son to sell his violin. After reminiscing about his life, the man tries to perform one last song. Failing to do so, he breaks his violin and commits suicide by firearm. His son still finds a way to profit from the violin's remaining bow.

== Plot summary ==
Peter Sadelack played second chair violin in Prague, and, despite losing his ability to play, continues to treasure his violin. His eldest son, Antone, tries to convince Peter to sell the violin. The story then describes his glamorous life back in Bohemia as he reminisces. After comparing his past and current lives, he attempts to play "Ave Maria", or Ellens dritter Gesang, on his violin. He cannot finish the song because of his shaking arm. Peter takes his violin to the stable and takes down Antone's gun. He breaks the violin and then shoots himself.

Antone finds his father frozen in the stable the next morning. He notices that his father forgot to break the bow, and he plans to sell it in town. Because Peter committed suicide outside in the cold, his body was unable to be straightened for a coffin; he is buried in a pine box instead.

== Characters ==
- Peter Sadelack, the main character of the short story. He was a second chair violinist in an orchestra in Prague. Despite tradition, he is not the master of his household. He likes to drink whiskey and reminisce about the past.
- Antone, Peter's son. He is the master of the household, and he is very careful with his money and requires each family member to help run the household and farm.
- Herr Mikilsdoff, an orchestra conductor in Prague in Peter's youth.
- French woman, a singer from Peter's days in Bohemia. She was very beautiful and had a wonderful voice. Peter enjoyed watching her sing, even though he couldn't understand the words. He mentions her just before he kills himself.

== Allusions to actual history ==
- In his youth, Peter knew Marie d'Agoult, Franz Liszt, Sarah Bernhardt and Rachel.

== Allusions to other works ==
- Peter remembers seeing Sarah Bernhardt act in Victorien Sardou's La Tosca. He also mentions Franz Liszt, Frédéric Chopin and Ave Maria.

== Criticism and significance ==
Peter was retouched and submitted for publication by her English professor, Herbert Bates, without her knowledge.

It has been argued that Peter reappeared in My Ántonia, with Mr Shimerda's suicide.
