= Fairfax Line =

Surveyor's line

Coordinates: 39.000°N 79.000°W

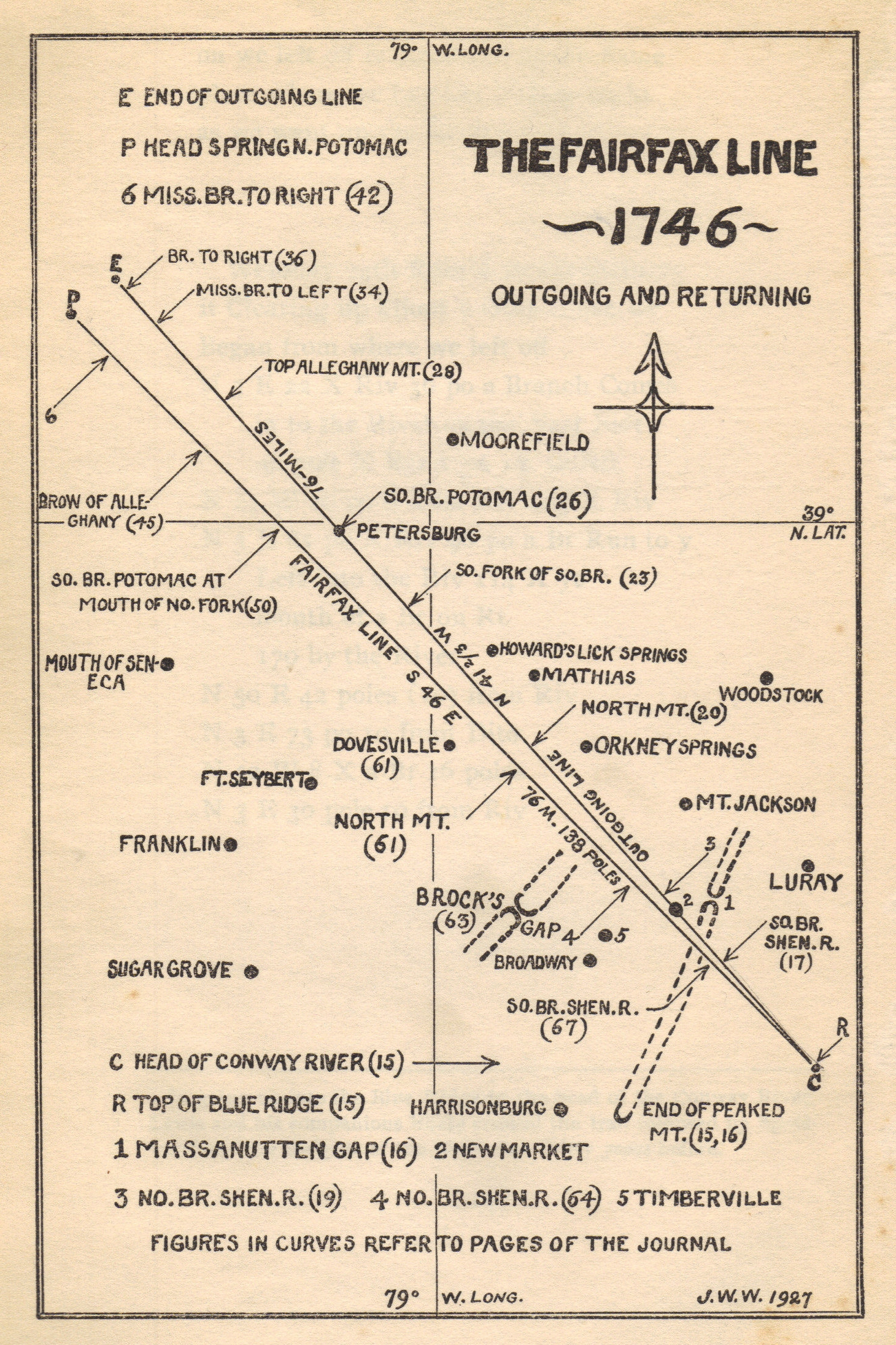
The Fairfax Line from The Fairfax Line: Thomas Lewis's Journal of 1746

The Fairfax Line was a surveyor's line run in 1746 to establish the limits of the "Northern Neck land grant," also known as the "Fairfax Grant", in colonial Virginia.

The land grant, first contrived in 1649, encompassed all lands bounded by the Potomac and Rappahannock Rivers, an area of 5,282,000 acres (21,380 km^{2}). By 1719, the lands had been inherited by Thomas Fairfax, 6th Lord Fairfax of Cameron (1693–1781). By that time, the question of the boundaries of the designated lands had also become highly contentious. In 1745 it was decided that a line between the sources of the North Branch Potomac River and the Rappahannock River would constitute the western limit of Lord Fairfax's lands.

== History ==
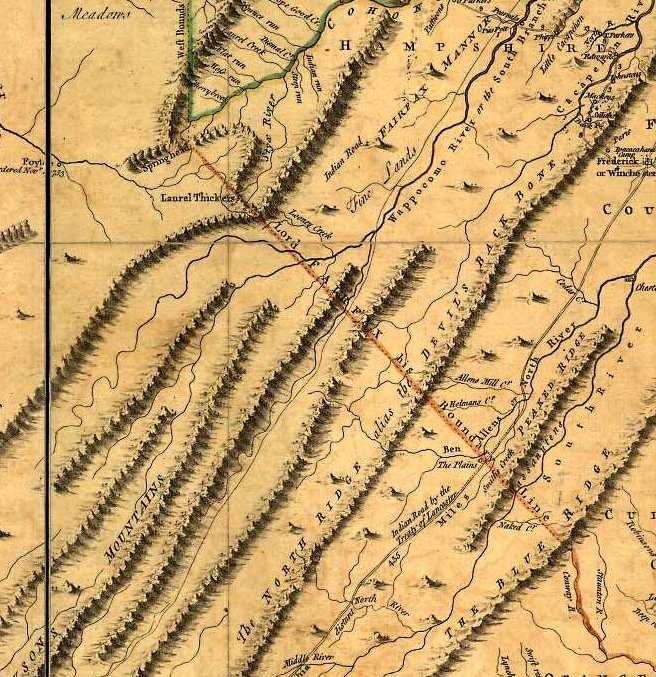
Detail from the "Fry-Jefferson map" of Virginia in 1751, showing "Lord Fairfax his Boundary Line"

The Northern Neck Grant, commonly referred to as the "Fairfax Grant", has its genesis in 1649 when the exiled King Charles II of Britain rewarded the two Colepeper (Culpeper) brothers and five other loyal friends by issuing a grant for a "porcon of Virginia ... bounded by and within the heads of the Rivers Rappahannock and Patawomecke....". The grant actually took force when Charles was restored to the throne in 1660 and it was recorded and a "Proprietary" created in the New World. At that time, the territory encompassed by the grant had not been explored and was not known. The seven original shares ultimately devolved to Thomas Fairfax, 5th Lord Fairfax of Cameron (1657–1710), who married the only child, a daughter named Catherine, of Thomas Colepeper, 2nd Baron Colepeper (1635–89). Thus the Northern Neck grant is commonly referred to as the "Fairfax Grant".

=== Disputes ===
The Commonwealth of Virginia frequently disputed the boundaries of the Fairfax Grant. In 1745, the Privy Council in London decided in favor of the 6th Lord Fairfax, designating that "the boundary of the petitioners land doth begin at the first spring of the South Branch of the River Rappahannack now called Rappidan[,] which first spring is the spring of that part of the said River Rappidan as is called in the plans returned by the name of Conway River[,] and that the said boundary be from thence drawn in a straight line North West to the place in the Allagany Mountains where that part of the River Pattawomeck alias Potowmack which is now called Cohongoroota alias Cohongoronton first arises." The imaginary line between the sources of the Conway River and the North Branch Potomac River is commonly referred to as "the Fairfax Line".

=== Surveys ===
In 1736, John Savage and his survey party had located the site of the source of the North Branch Potomac River (the northern boundary of the tract), but had made no attempt to establish the western boundaries of Lord Fairfax's lands. A 1746 survey (the "Survey of the Fairfax Line"), however, was accomplished by Colonel Peter Jefferson and Thomas Lewis under extremely arduous conditions and resulted in both the emplacement of a boundary marker (the "Fairfax Stone") at the source and the official demarcation of the Fairfax Line, extending from the Stone south-east to the headwater of the Conway River. Lewis's journal of the expedition provides a vivid account of the extraordinarily difficult terrain of the pre-settlement Allegheny Mountains.

== Geography ==
The Fairfax Line runs in a northwesterly direction for about 77 miles (124 km) through exceptionally rugged terrain: from the crest of the Blue Ridge Mountains in Virginia, to that of the Allegheny Mountains in West Virginia, traversing the headwaters of the Shenandoah River along the way. The southeastern terminus of the line is the source of the Conway River, a tributary of the Rappahannock. The source is on the eastern slope of the Blue Ridge Mountains, near mile marker 55 on the Skyline Drive (approximately 30 miles (48 km) north of Charlottesville, Virginia), where the borders of the Virginia counties of Page, Madison and Greene meet. In the Shenandoah Valley, the line coincides with the southern boundary of the town of New Market, Virginia, and marks the boundary between Virginia counties of Rockingham and Shenandoah. Continuing northwestward, the line marks the state boundary between Hardy County, West Virginia and Rockingham County, Virginia, and passes through the city of Petersburg, West Virginia. The northwestern terminus of the line — at the Fairfax Stone — is the source of the North Branch of the Potomac River. The stone's location is on the borders of the present West Virginia counties of Preston, Tucker and Grant, and one mile south of the southwestern tip of Maryland Panhandle.
