= Grover, Colorado =

Town in Colorado, United States

- Statutory Town
- Town of Grover
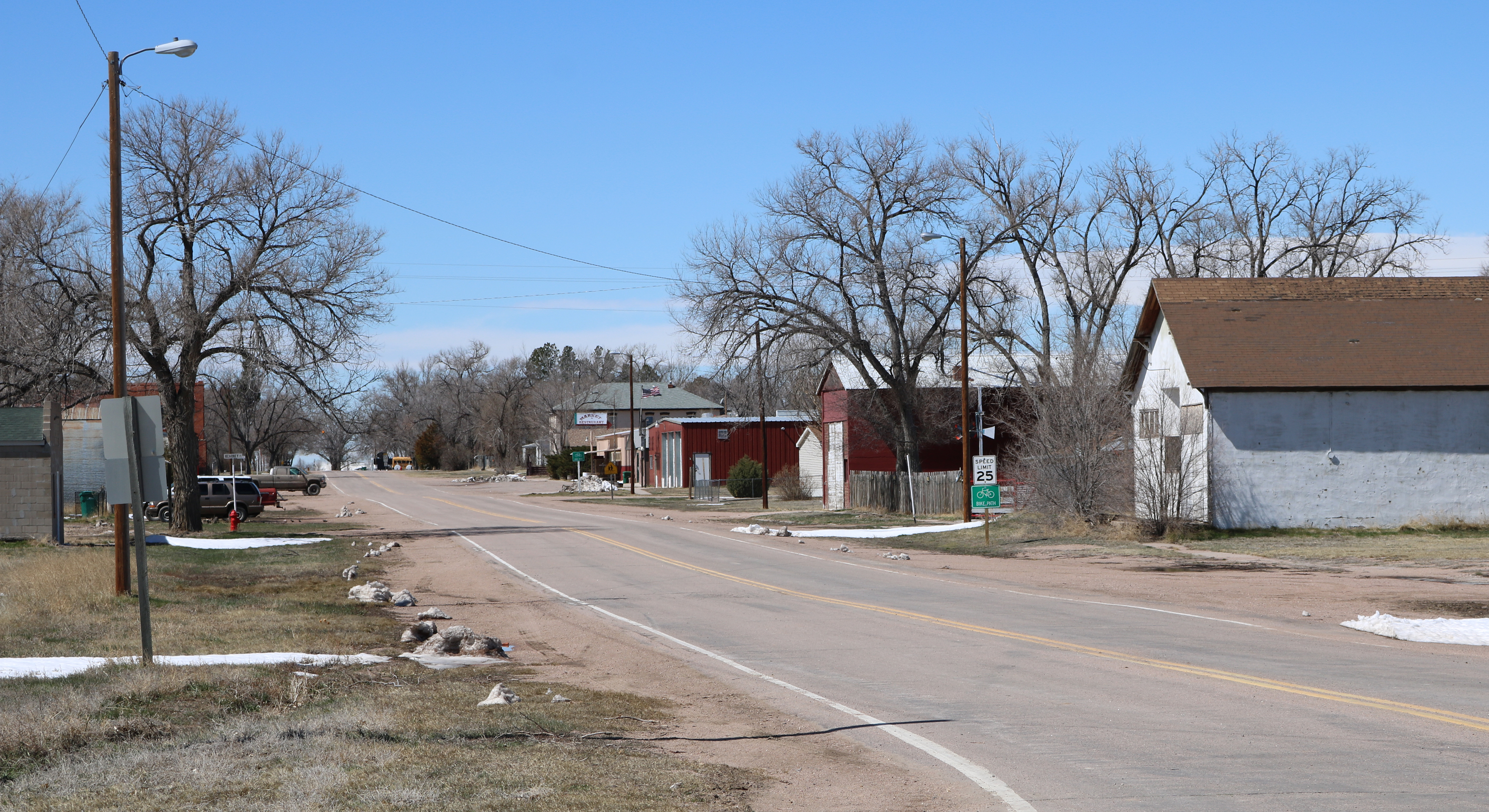
- County Road 120 3/4, Grover's main street.

- Location of the Town of Grover in Weld County, Colorado.
- Coordinates: 40°52′24″N 104°13′38″W
- Country: United States
- State: Colorado
- County: Weld County
- Incorporated (town): October 6, 1916

Government
  - Type: Statutory town

Area
  - Total: 0.595 sq mi (1.542 km^{2})
  - Land: 0.595 sq mi (1.542 km^{2})
  - Water: 0 sq mi (0.000 km^{2})
- Elevation: 5,076 ft (1,547 m)

Population (2020)
  - Total: 157
  - Density: 264/sq mi (102/km^{2})
- Time zone: UTC−07:00 (MST)
  - Summer (DST): UTC−06:00 (MDT)
- ZIP code: 80729
- Area code: 970
- FIPS code: 08-33310
- GNIS feature ID: 2412712
- Website: www.facebook.com/GroverColorado/

The Town of Grover is a Statutory Town located in Weld County, Colorado, United States. The town population was 157 at the 2020 United States census, a 14.60% increase since the 2010 United States census. Grover is a part of the Greeley, CO Metropolitan Statistical Area and the Front Range Urban Corridor.

== Geography ==
At the 2020 United States census, the town had a total area of 381 acres (1.542 km^{2}), all of it land.

== Demographics ==
Historical population
Census	Pop.	Note	%±
1920	195		—
1930	165		−15.4%
1940	137		−17.0%
1950	146		6.6%
1960	133		−8.9%
1970	121		−9.0%
1980	158		30.6%
1990	135		−14.6%
2000	153		13.3%
2010	137		−10.5%
2020	157		14.6%
U.S. Decennial Census

As of the census of 2000, there were 153 people, 78 households, and 32 families residing in the town. The population density was 304.7 inhabitants per square mile (117.6/km^{2}). There were 85 housing units at an average density of 169.3 per square mile (65.4/km^{2}). The racial makeup of the town was 96.08% White, 1.96% African American, 1.31% Native American, 0.65% from other races. Hispanic or Latino of any race were 1.96% of the population.

There were 78 households, out of which 23.1% had children under the age of 18 living with them, 39.7% were married couples living together, 2.6% had a female householder with no husband present, and 57.7% were non-families. 52.6% of all households were made up of individuals, and 26.9% had someone living alone who was 65 years of age or older. The average household size was 1.96 and the average family size was 3.15.

In the town, the population was spread out, with 26.1% under the age of 18, 1.3% from 18 to 24, 22.9% from 25 to 44, 29.4% from 45 to 64, and 20.3% who were 65 years of age or older. The median age was 45 years. For every 100 females, there were 86.6 males. For every 100 females age 18 and over, there were 85.2 males.

The median income for a household in the town was $17,679, and the median income for a family was $18,438. Males had a median income of $21,875 versus $25,625 for females. The per capita income for the town was $9,342. About 36.0% of families and 45.2% of the population were below the poverty line, including 71.4% of those under the age of eighteen and 20.0% of those 65 or over.

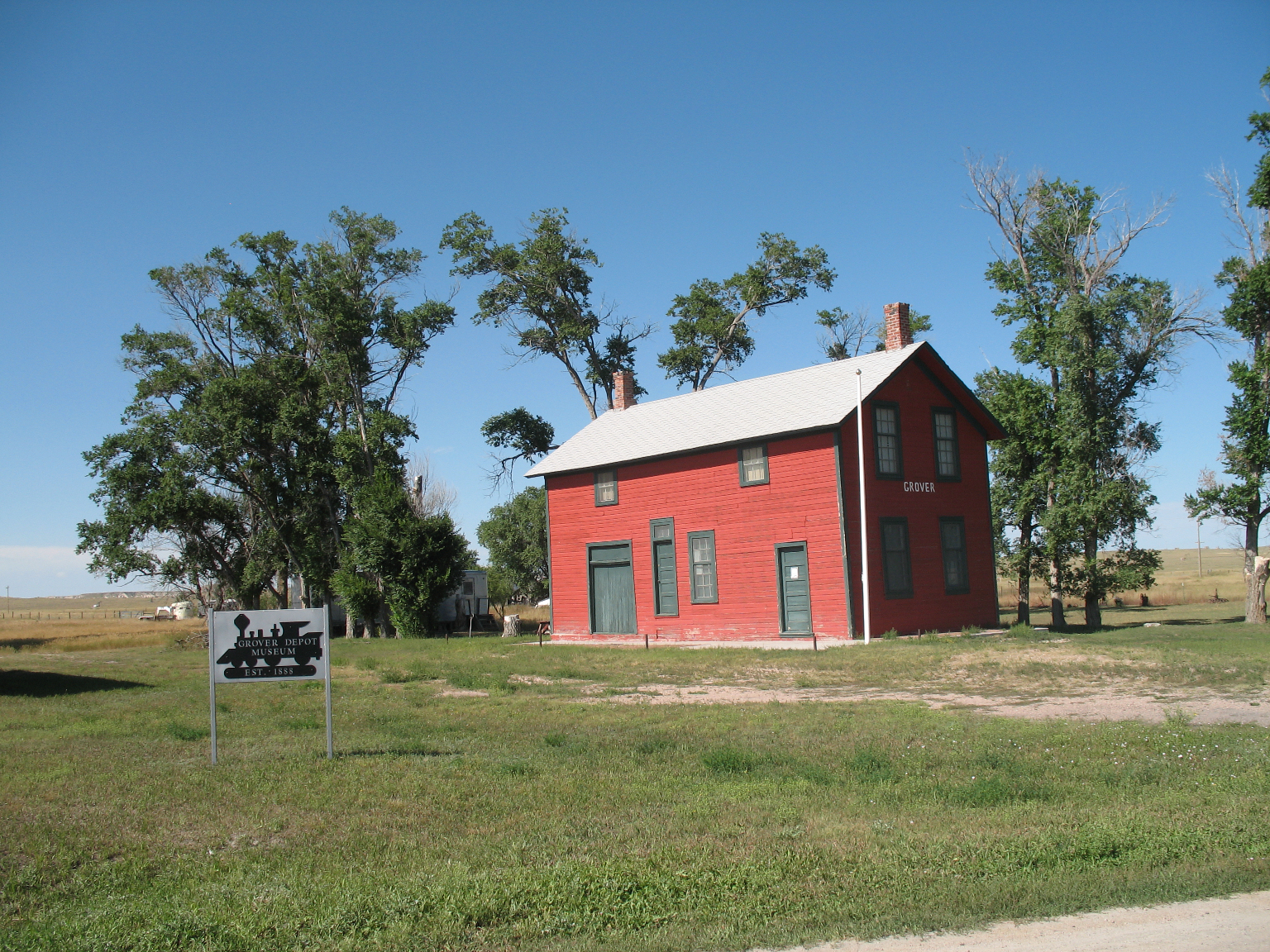
Grover Depot

== Allusions in literature ==
- Willa Cather's 1900 short story The Affair at Grover Station contains a description of Grover, as per, 'You know what Grover is, a red box of a station, section house barricaded by coal sheds and a little group of dwellings at the end of everything, with the desert running out on every side to the sky line.'

== See also ==
- Greeley, CO Metropolitan Statistical Area
- Denver-Aurora-Greeley, CO Combined Statistical Area
- Front Range Urban Corridor
