= Swan Pond Manor Historic District =

Historic district in West Virginia, United States

- U.S. National Register of Historic Places
- U.S. Historic district
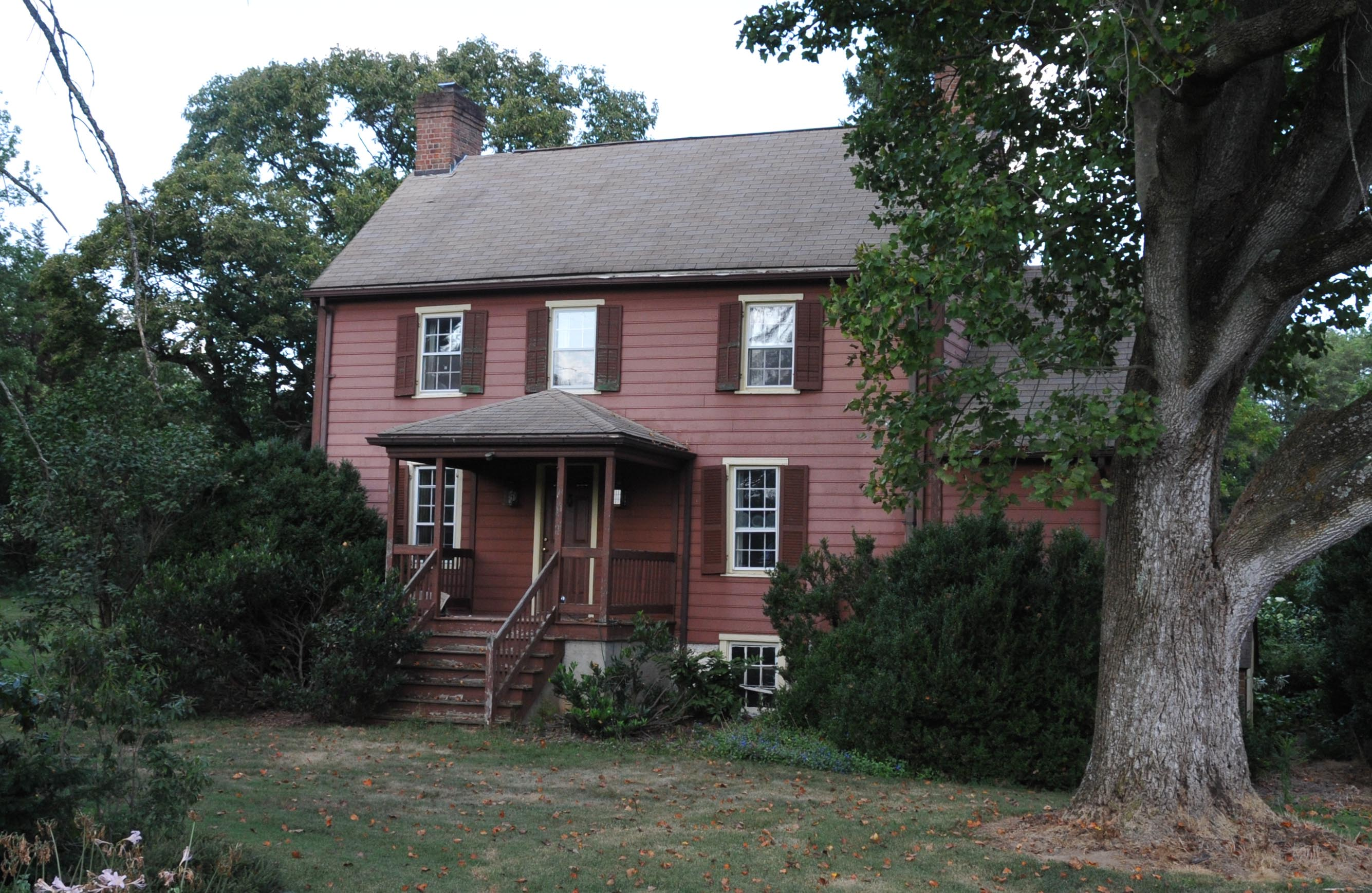

- Location within West Virginia Location within the United States
- Location: Swan Pond, near Martinsburg, West Virginia
- Coordinates: 39°28′18″N 77°51′57″W
- Area: 2,465 acres (998 ha)
- Architect: Multiple
- Architectural style: Greek Revival
- MPS: Berkeley County MRA
- NRHP reference No.: 80004425
- Added to NRHP: December 10, 1980

Swan Pond Manor Historic District is a national historic district located near Martinsburg, Berkeley County, West Virginia, U.S.A. It encompasses 21 contributing buildings, one site, and one structure, over 2,465 acres. The agricultural district boundaries reflect the Swan Pond Manor land of Thomas Fairfax, 6th Lord Fairfax of Cameron, which he set aside in 1747 as a part of his Northern Neck Territory for his personal use. Notable buildings include the Capt. James Mason House, Kroh-Sprinkle House (1819), Jacob A. Small House, Robert Carter Willis House, Dr. Williams House (a Greek Revival style house built c. 1840), "Hollidale," and "Wood Haven" (1895), Raleigh Morgan House. Also located in the district is the separately listed Swan Pond.

It was listed on the National Register of Historic Places in 1980.
