= Mildred Aldrich =

American journalist and writer

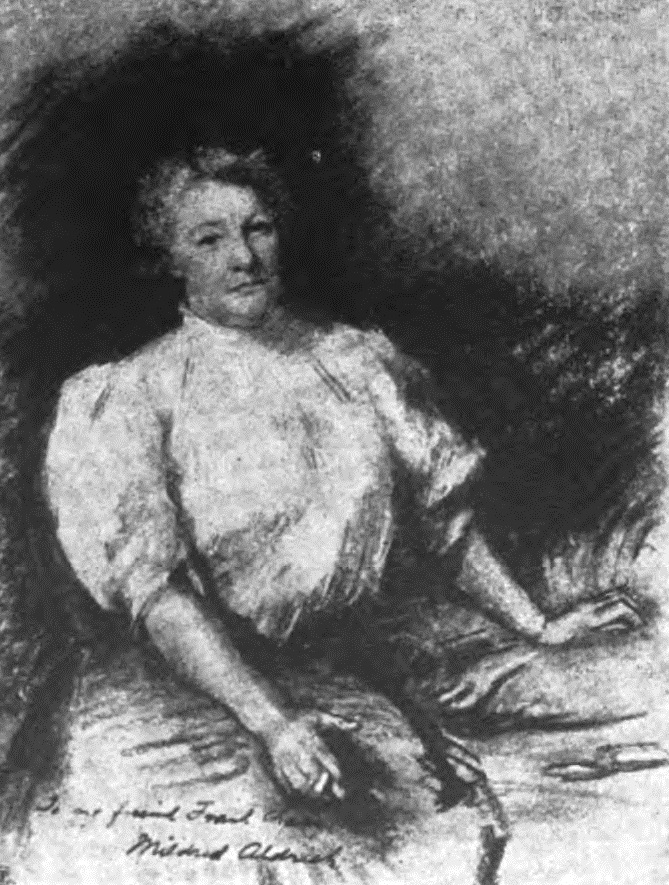
- Portrait of Mildred Aldrich
- Born: November 16, 1853; Providence, Rhode Island, US
- Died: February 19, 1928 (aged 74); Neuilly-sur-Seine, France
- Resting place: Cemetery of Quincy-Segy, Quincy-Voisins, France
- Education: Everett High School, Boston, Massachusetts
- Occupations: Journalist, editor, author, translator
- Writing career
- Years active: 1872-1926
- Notable work: Four collections of letters about WWI
- Notable awards: French Legion of Honour

Mildred Aldrich (1853–1928) was an American journalist, editor, writer and translator. She spent her early career as a journalist and editor in Boston before moving to Paris, where she continued working as a foreign correspondent and translator. In 1914, shortly before the start of World War I, she retired to a house in the French countryside overlooking the Marne River valley. She published a novel and four accounts of her life based on collections of her letters written during the war years. In 1922, she was awarded the French Legion of Honour in recognition of her assistance to soldiers and refugees, and the influence her books apparently had in persuading the United States government to declare war on Germany.

== Biography ==
Mildred Aldrich was born on November 16, 1853, in Providence, Rhode Island, to Edwin and Lucy Ayers (Baker) Aldrich. She grew up in Boston and graduated from Everett High School in 1872. After teaching elementary school for a short time, she began her career in journalism.

Aldrich worked for 12 years as secretary to the manager of the Boston Home Journal and contributed articles using the pseudonym H. Quinn. In 1892, she founded and edited The Mahogany Tree, a weekly journal of ideas containing fiction, poetry, and drama and book reviews. She joined The Boston Journal in 1894 and moved the following year to the Boston Herald, where she worked as a drama critic.

Aldrich moved to France in 1898, joining a circle of American expatriate writers that included Gertrude Stein and Alice B. Toklas. Here she found a mixed portfolio of work as a foreign correspondent, a translator and an agent for American theatre producers, as well as a writer of articles for American magazines.

In July 1914, she moved to a house called La Creste (Hilltop) at Huiry, thirty miles east of Paris. "I have come to feel the need of calm and quiet - perfect peace" she wrote. Ironically, the First World War began three months later, and this site, with its clear view of the Marne River valley, would provide her greatest writing success. She had a birds-eye view of the first Battle of the Marne and began to write a series of letters about her life during the war. The letters were collected in four volumes. A Hilltop on the Marne (1915) was based on her journal entries and on letters she wrote to Gertrude Stein. It first appeared as a serialised account in the Atlantic Monthly. It was followed by On the Edge of the War Zone (1917), The Peak of the Load (1918) and When Johnny Comes Marching Home (1919). They are emotive first-person narratives, recollecting the individuals and events of Aldrich's own life during the war.

Aldrich's sole work of fiction, the novel Told in a French Garden, August, 1914, which describes a dinner party where nine guests each tell a story, was published in 1916.

She received the French Legion of Honor in 1922 for her war work and her influence on the United States entry into the war.

A fund established in 1924 by her friends Gertrude Stein and Alice B. Toklas helped support Aldrich in her final years.

In 1926 Aldrich completed an autobiography entitled Confessions of a Breadwinner, which resides in the collections of the Schlesinger Library at Harvard University. The book has never been published, but digital images of the typed manuscripts are displayed on the Harvard University website.

She suffered a heart attack and died on February 19, 1928, at the American Hospital in Neuilly. She is buried at the Church of St Denis (Cemetery of Quincy-Segy) in Quincy-Voisins, France.

== Bibliography ==
=== Collections of letters ===
- A Hilltop on the Marne (1915)
- On the Edge of the War Zone (1917)
- The Peak of the Load (1918)
- When Johnny Comes Marching Home (1919)

=== Novel ===
- Told In A French Garden, August 1914 (1916)
