= Fairfax Stone Historical Monument State Park =

Park in Preston County, West Virginia, US

- IUCN category III (natural monument or feature)
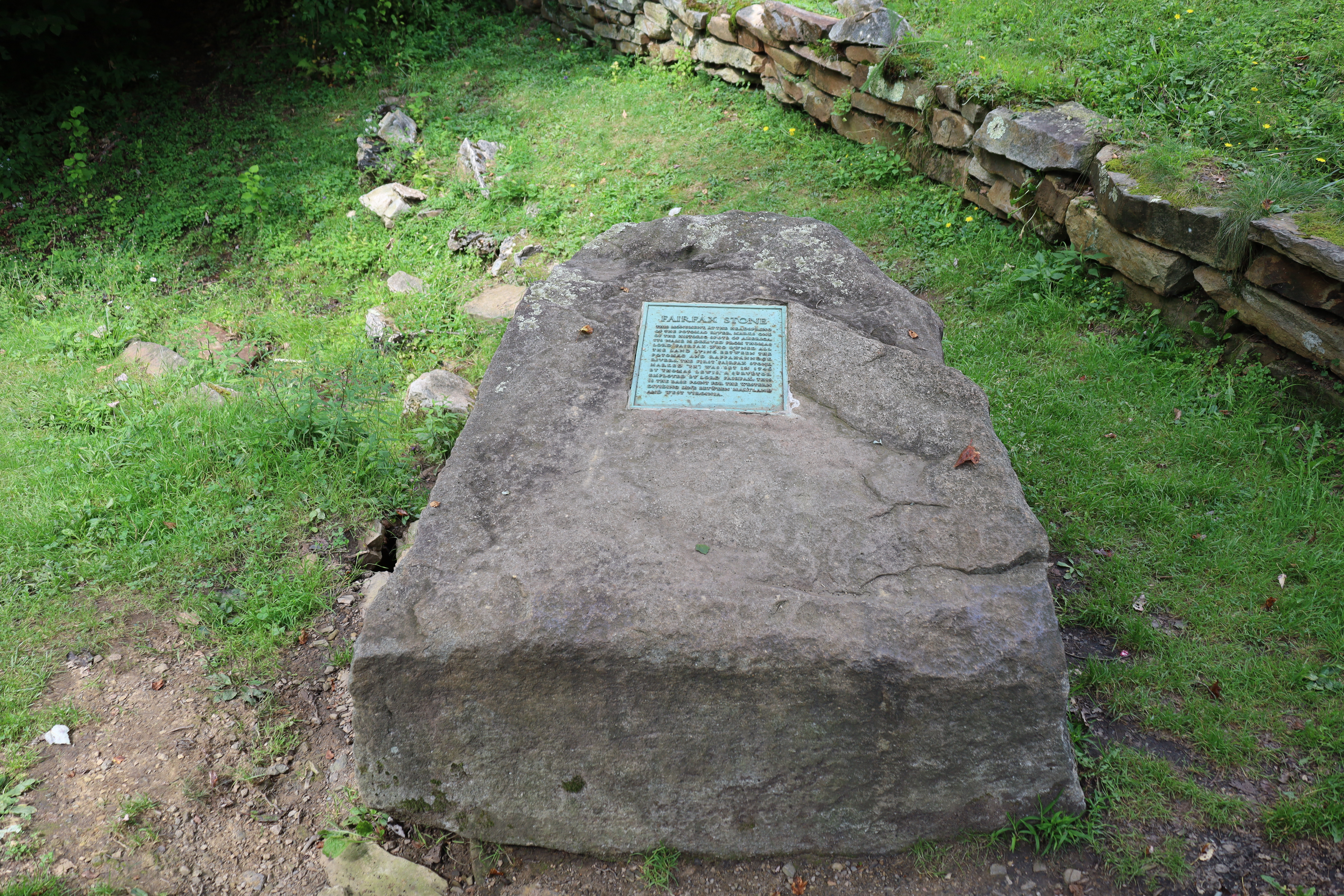
- Fairfax Stone

- Location within West Virginia
- Location: West Virginia, United States
- Coordinates: 39°11′42″N 79°29′15″W
- Area: 4 acres (1.6 ha)
- Elevation: 3,169 ft (966 m)
- Established: 1957
- Named for: Fairfax Stone
- Governing body: West Virginia Division of Natural Resources
- Website: wvstateparks.com/park/fairfax-stone-state-park/
- Fairfax Stone Historical Monument
- U.S. National Register of Historic Places
- Location: near Thomas, West Virginia
- Built: 1746
- NRHP reference No.: 70000653
- Added to NRHP: January 26, 1970

Fairfax Stone Historical Monument State Park is a West Virginia state park commemorating the Fairfax Stone, a surveyor's marker and boundary stone at the source of the North Branch of the Potomac River. The original stone was placed on October 23, 1746, to settle a boundary dispute between Thomas Fairfax, 6th Lord Fairfax of Cameron and the Privy Council of Great Britain concerning the Northern Neck of Virginia. It determined the proprietorship and boundaries of a large tract of mostly unsurveyed land in the British colonies of Maryland and Virginia.

== Park ==
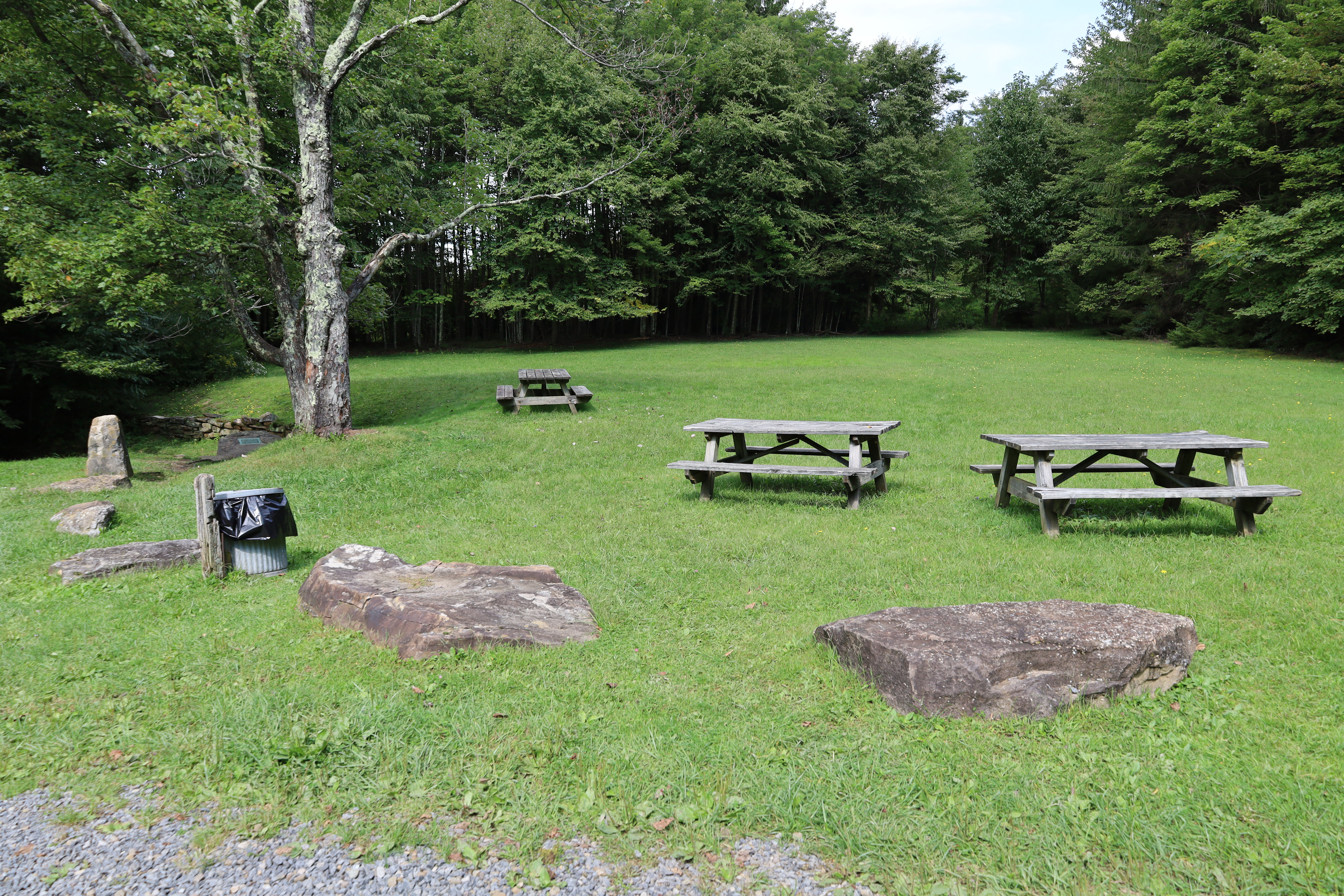
The park beside the Fairfax Stone is a clearing at the end of a road with a few picnic tables

Fairfax Stone Historical Monument, part of a four-acre West Virginia state park, is six miles north of Thomas, West Virginia. The site is sparsely developed, lacking any buildings or restroom facilities.

== History ==
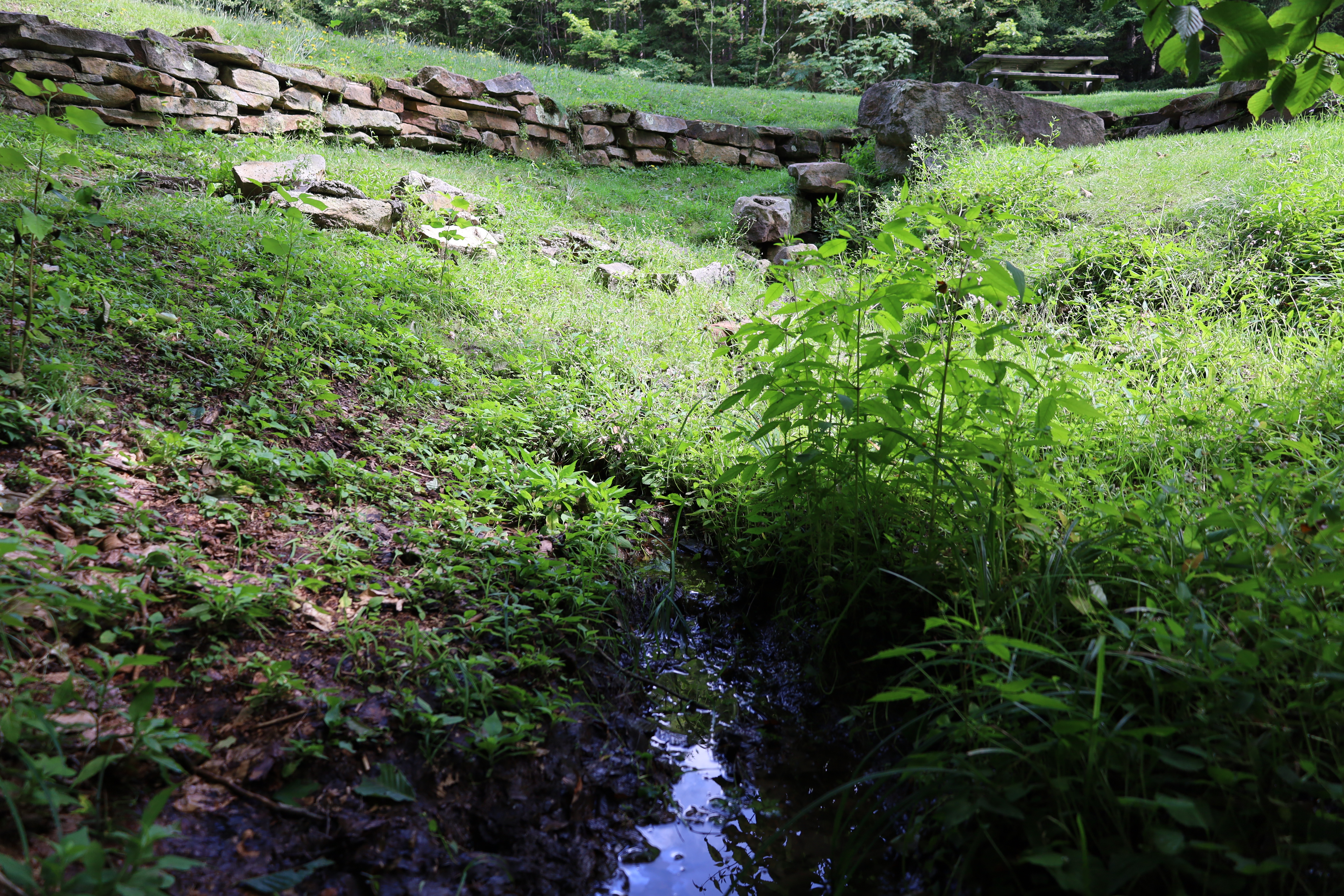
The North Branch Potomac River emerging from under the Fairfax Stone

The exact boundaries of the "Northern Neck Land Grant" (later called the "Fairfax Grant") had been undetermined since it was first contrived in 1649 by the then-exiled Charles II of England. John Savage and his survey party had located the site of the source of the North Branch of the Potomac River (the northern boundary of the tract) in 1736, but had made no attempt to establish the western boundaries. A 1746 survey by Colonel Peter Jefferson (Thomas Jefferson's father) and Thomas Lewis resulted in both the placement of the Fairfax Stone as well as the establishment of a line of demarcation known as the "Fairfax Line", extending from the Stone to the south-east and ending at the source of the Rappahannock River, a distance of 77 miles (124 km). In 1748, George Washington, along with frontiersman and noted surveyor David Morgan of Virginia, had surveyed the area again. Their job was to establish the northernmost boundary of Lord Fairfax's land and estate, on the present day borders of Maryland and West Virginia. They placed the Fairfax Stone where it is today for a consummation of their hard work. The North Branch of the Potomac River initially heads west from its source at the Fairfax Stone before curving north and then generally flowing east toward Chesapeake Bay. For this reason, the Stone is only a county corner of West Virginia counties rather than part of the state's border with Maryland, an issue that was only resolved when the Supreme Court ruled against Maryland in 1910 in Maryland v. West Virginia, determining that Maryland would only go westward up the Potomac far enough to meet a point where a line north from the Fairfax Stone would cross that branch of the Potomac. Until the ruling, the boundary of Maryland was indeterminate. Three West Virginia counties—Grant, Preston and Tucker— share the boundary marked by the Fairfax Stone (West Virginia having seceded from Virginia during the American Civil War).

The site was placed on the National Register of Historic Places on January 26, 1970.

== Fate of the original stone ==
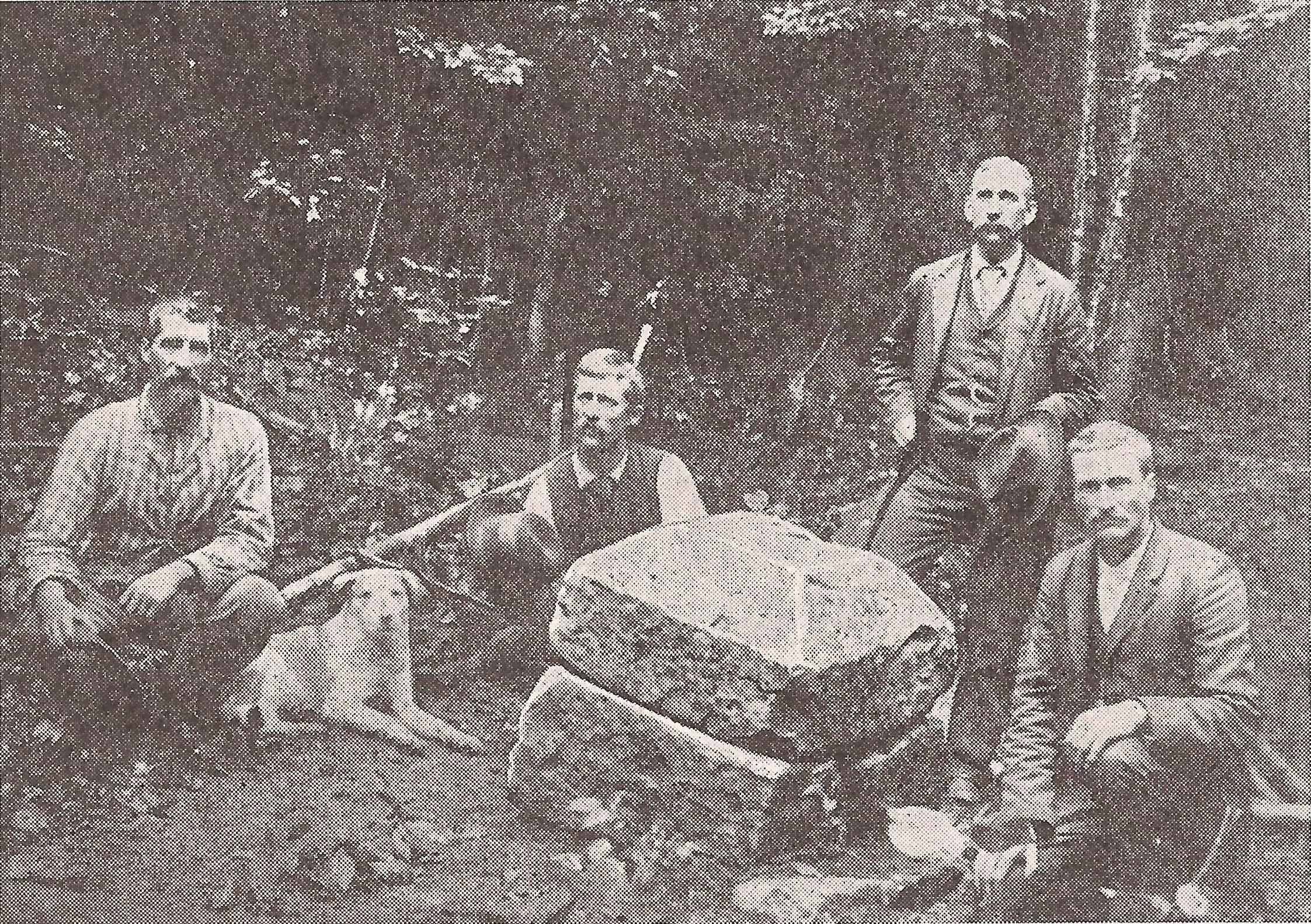
The Fairfax Stone in 1881

The original Fairfax Stone, in accordance with common surveying practices of the era, was most likely simply a natural, unmarked rock selected from among the outcroppings in the area. Legal boundary disputes between Maryland and Virginia caused the latter to relocate the stone in 1833 after the site had been lost to memory. The stone was still intact in 1859 when one Lieutenant Melcher found it again and reran the "Fairfax Line" on behalf of the two states. The Stone was gone by 1909, however, having been carried away by vandals. There have been six Fairfax Stones, each one replacing the last owing to weathering or vandalism. The current stone is a six-ton rock with a flat face, on which is inlaid a historical plaque detailing the stone's significance. Next to it is the 1910 stone. The present six-ton Fairfax Stone was dedicated on October 5, 1957.

== Plaque legend ==
"Fairfax Stone"
"This monument, at the headspring of the Potomac River, Marks one of the historic spots of America. Its name is derived from Thomas Lord Fairfax who owned all the land lying between the Potomac and Rappahannock Rivers. The first Fairfax Stone, marked "FX", was set in 1746 by Thomas Lewis, a surveyor employed by Lord Fairfax. This is the base point for the western dividing line between Maryland and West Virginia."

== See also ==
- List of West Virginia state parks
