= Thomas Fairfax, 6th Lord Fairfax of Cameron =

British-born planter

The Right Honorable The Lord Fairfax of Cameron
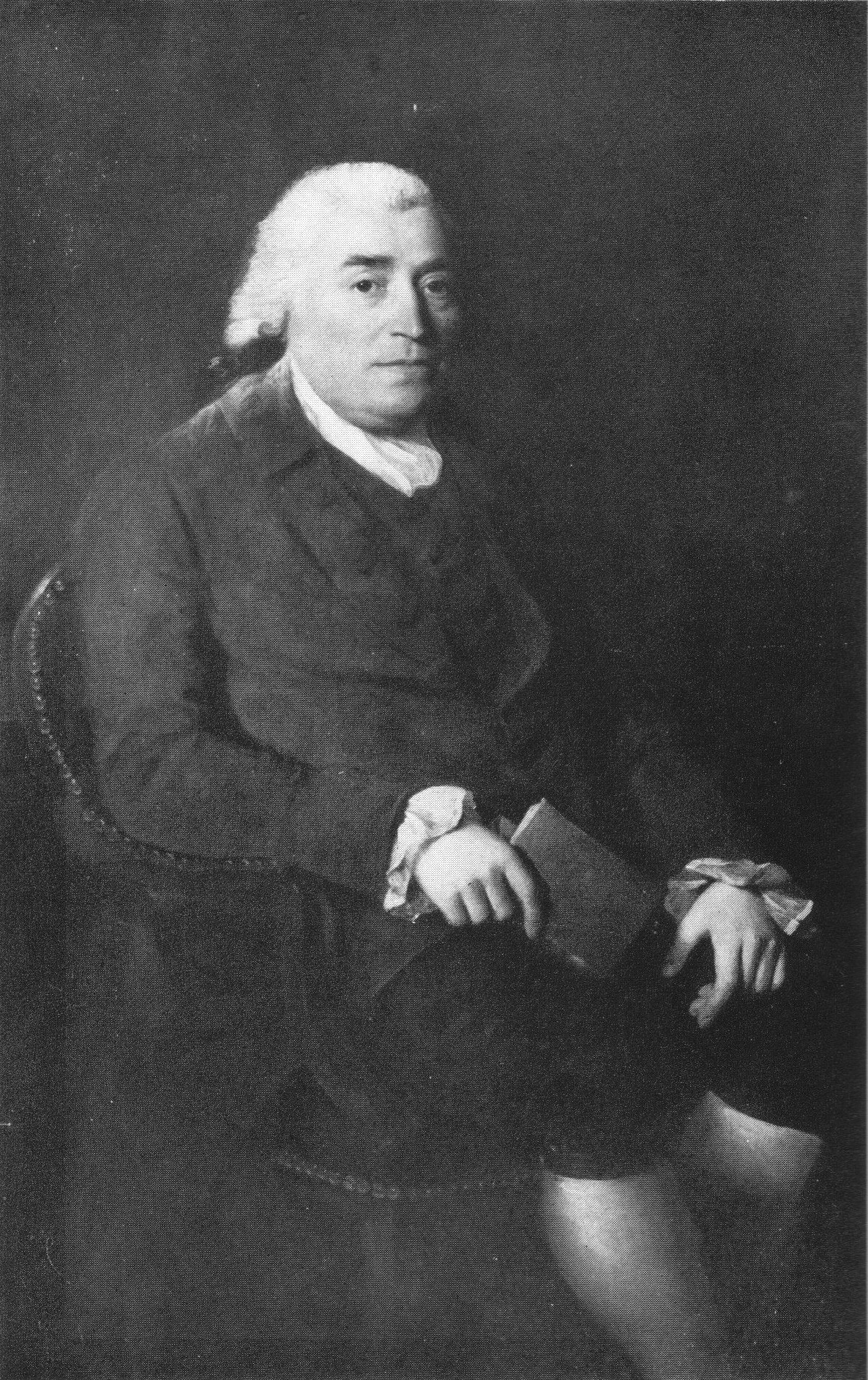
- Born: 22 October 1693; Kent, England
- Died: 9 December 1781 (aged 88); Greenway Court, Virginia
- Parents: Thomas Fairfax, 5th Lord Fairfax of Cameron, Catherine Colepeper
- Military career
- Education: Oriel College, Oxford
- Allegiance: Great Britain
- Branch: British Army
- Service years: 1721–1733
- Unit: Royal Regiment of Horse Guards

Thomas Fairfax, 6th Lord Fairfax of Cameron (22 October 1693 – 9 December 1781) was an Anglo-American peer and planter. The only member of the British peerage to permanently reside in British America, Fairfax owned the Northern Neck Proprietary in the Colony of Virginia, where he spent the majority of his life. The proprietary had been granted to Fairfax's great-grandfather John Colepeper, 1st Baron Colepeper by Charles II of England in 1649.

On his Virginian estates, Fairfax developed a profitable operation. A steadfast Loyalist during the American Revolution, he was largely protected from the loss of his property due to his friendship with George Washington. Several places in Northern Virginia and the eastern panhandle of West Virginia are named for him, including Fairfax County, Virginia and the City of Fairfax.

== Early life and education ==
Fairfax's coat of arms. The motto reads FARE FAC

Fairfax was born on 22 October 1693 in Leeds Castle, in Kent, England. The castle had been owned by his maternal ancestors since the 1630s. Fairfax was the son of Thomas Fairfax, 5th Lord Fairfax of Cameron and Catherine Colepeper, the daughter of Thomas Colepeper, 2nd Baron Colepeper.

Fairfax succeeded to his father's Scottish peerage in 1709, and was educated at Oriel College at the University of Oxford between 1710 and 1713.

== Career ==
In 1719, Fairfax came into possession of the Northern Neck Proprietary in the British colony of Virginia, which had been granted to Fairfax's maternal ancestor John Colepeper, 1st Baron Colepeper by Charles II of England in 1649. The property included a large portion of the Shenandoah and South Branch Potomac valleys, and consisted of approximately 5,282,000 acres (21,380 km^{2}) of land.

Struggling to maintain his expensive lifestyle and Leeds Castle, Fairfax relied heavily on the income he derived from the Northern Neck Proprietary, both from the sale of parcels of land to and annual quit-rents from planters who settled in the Northern Neck of Virginia. His affairs in Virginia were handled by Fairfax's resident land agent, Robert Carter I.

In 1721, Fairfax was commissioned into the British Army, serving in the Royal Regiment of Horse Guards until 1733. He was also a contributor to The Spectator, a daily publication founded by Joseph Addison and Richard Steele in 1711 before it ceased publication in the next year.

In the fall of 1732, Fairfax read Carter's obituary in the London monthly The Gentleman's Magazine and was astonished to discover the vast personal wealth Carter had accumulated, which included £10,000 worth of cash, at a time when the governor of Virginia was paid an annual salary of £200. Rather than appoint another Virginian to the position, Fairfax arranged to have his cousin William Fairfax move from Massachusetts to Virginia in 1734 to serve as his resident land agent. Fairfax travelled to Virginia for the first time in 1735 to inspect and manage his estates there, remaining in the colony until 1737. In 1738, Fairfax established approximately thirty farms in the Patterson Creek Manor, a 9,000-acre (36 km^{2}) piece of land granted to him by the Crown.

The northwestern boundary of the Northern Neck Proprietary, which had been contested by the Privy Council of Great Britain, was marked in 1746 by the Fairfax Stone at the headwaters of the North Branch Potomac River. Returning to North America in 1747, Fairfax first settled at Belvoir, a slave plantation which had been completed by William six years earlier. In the same year, he also set aside land for personal use at Swan Pond Manor. Fairfax also became active in developing his Virginian estates and collecting quit-rents, along with utilizing the forced labour of hundreds of black slaves who worked on his estates. He personally bought and sold slaves and, in 1777, engaged in the "little talked about" activity of "bedding down with a negro wench".

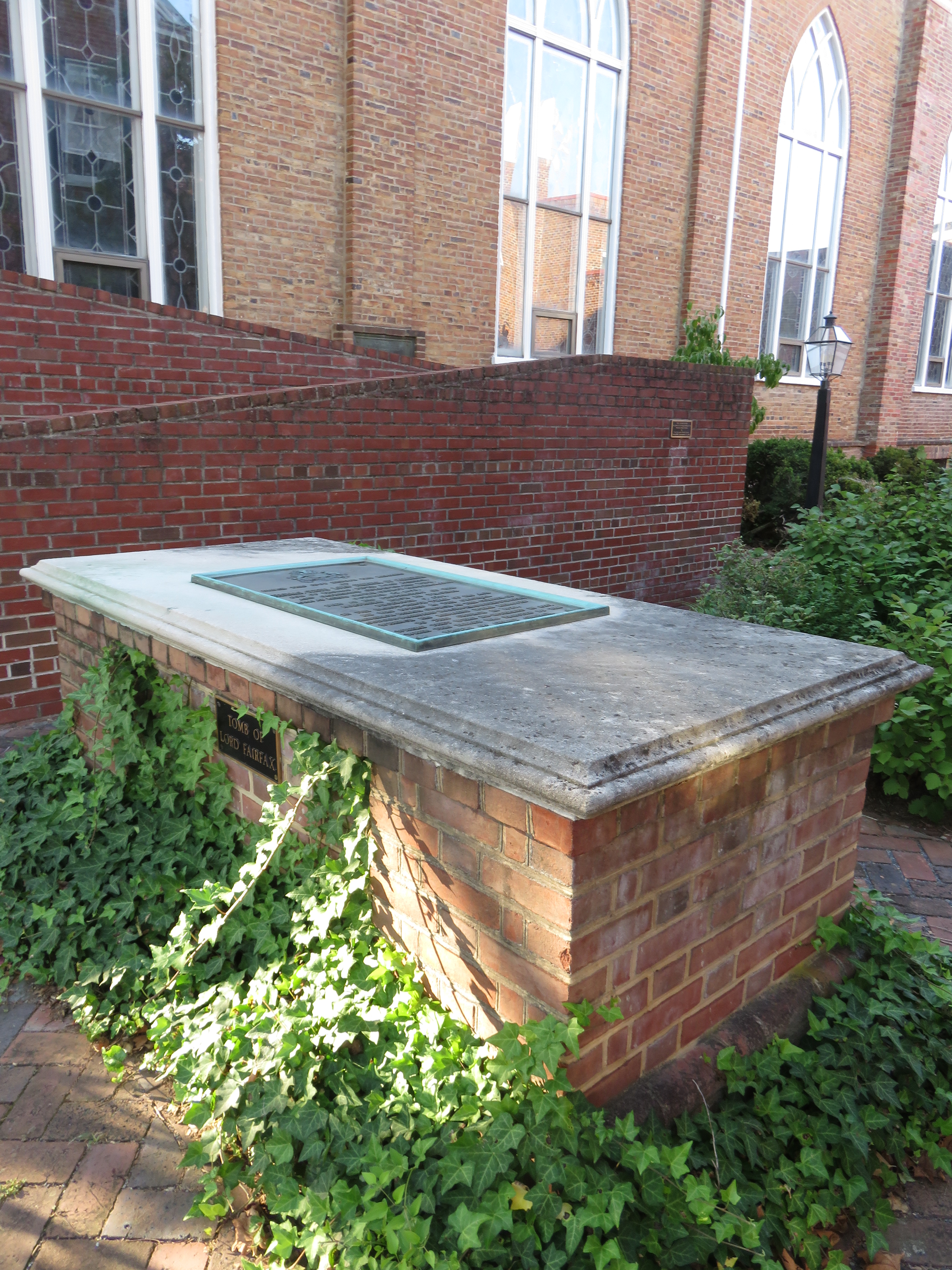
Fairfax's tomb at the Christ Episcopal Church in Winchester, Virginia

Fairfax was the only British peer who resided in the Thirteen Colonies. In 1748, he became acquainted with George Washington, who was a distant relative of the Fairfax family. Impressed with Washington's energy and talents, Fairfax employed him to survey his lands west of the Blue Ridge Mountains, which was Washington's first employment. Fairfax, a lifelong bachelor, moved to the Shenandoah Valley in 1752. At the suggestion of his nephew Thomas, he settled down in a hunting lodge at Greenway Court. Fairfax and Thomas lived together in a style of liberal hospitality, frequently engaging in fox hunts. He also served as both county lieutenant and justice of the peace for Frederick County.

During the American Revolution, he remained quiet about his avowed Loyalist views, and was protected by his friendship with Washington. The title to his domain, however, was confiscated by the Virginia Act of 1779.

== Death ==
Less than two months after Washington's victory at the Siege of Yorktown, Fairfax died in Greenway Court on 9 December 1781. He was buried in the Christ Episcopal Church in Winchester.

== Legacy ==
Lord Fairfax's title descended to his younger brother, Robert Fairfax, 7th Lord Fairfax of Cameron, who was also descended from the 5th Lord Fairfax of Cameron, who died at Leeds Castle in 1793. Since, were it not for the Revolutionary War, his immense domain should also have passed to Robert Fairfax, the latter was awarded £13,758 in 1792, by Act of Parliament for the relief of American Loyalists. A portion of this estate, devised to nephew Denny Martin Fairfax, was later the subject of the landmark U.S. Supreme Court case Martin v. Hunter's Lessee (1816). His younger cousin, son of his manager William Fairfax and half-brother of George William Fairfax, Rev. Bryan Fairfax, would eventually return to England to assert his claim and become the 8th Lord Fairfax of Cameron.

Fairfax County, Virginia, and the City of Fairfax, Virginia, are named for Lord Fairfax. Fairfax and Cameron Streets in Alexandria, Virginia, are named for Lord Fairfax. The town's first survey map was made in 1749 by Lord Fairfax's young protégé George Washington. The Fairfax Line and Fairfax Stone both bear Lord Fairfax's name. Lord Fairfax Community College bore his name, but it was changed to Laurel Ridge Community College in July 2021. The Swan Pond Manor Historic District encompasses land Lord Fairfax set aside in 1747 for his personal use.

Ancestors of Thomas Fairfax, 6th Lord Fairfax of Cameron

16. Thomas Fairfax, 1st Lord Fairfax of Cameron
8. Rev. Henry Fairfax
17. Ellen Aske
4. Henry Fairfax, 4th Lord Fairfax of Cameron
18. Sir Henry Cholmley of Roxby
9. Mary Cholmley
19. Margaret Babthorpe
2. Thomas Fairfax, 5th Lord Fairfax of Cameron
20.
10. Sir Robert Barwick of Toulston
21.
5. Frances Barwick
22. Walter Strickland of Boynton
11. Ursula Strickland
23. Frances Wentworth
1. Thomas Fairfax, 6th Lord Fairfax of Cameron
24. Thomas Colepeper of Wigsell
12. John Colepeper, 1st Baron Colepeper
25. Anne Slaney
6. Thomas Colepeper, 2nd Baron Colepeper
26. Sir Thomas Colepeper of Hollingbourne
13. Judith Colepeper
27. Elizabeth Chaney
3. Catherine Colepeper
28. Jan van Hesse
14. Jan van Hesse
29. Barbara van Panhuys
7. Margaretta van Hesse
30. Abel van Cats
15. Catharina van Cats
31. Charlotte van Tuyll van Serooskerke

Peerage of Scotland
Preceded by Thomas Fairfax	Lord Fairfax of Cameron; 1709–1781	Succeeded by Robert Fairfax
