= The Grandissimes: A Story of Creole Life =

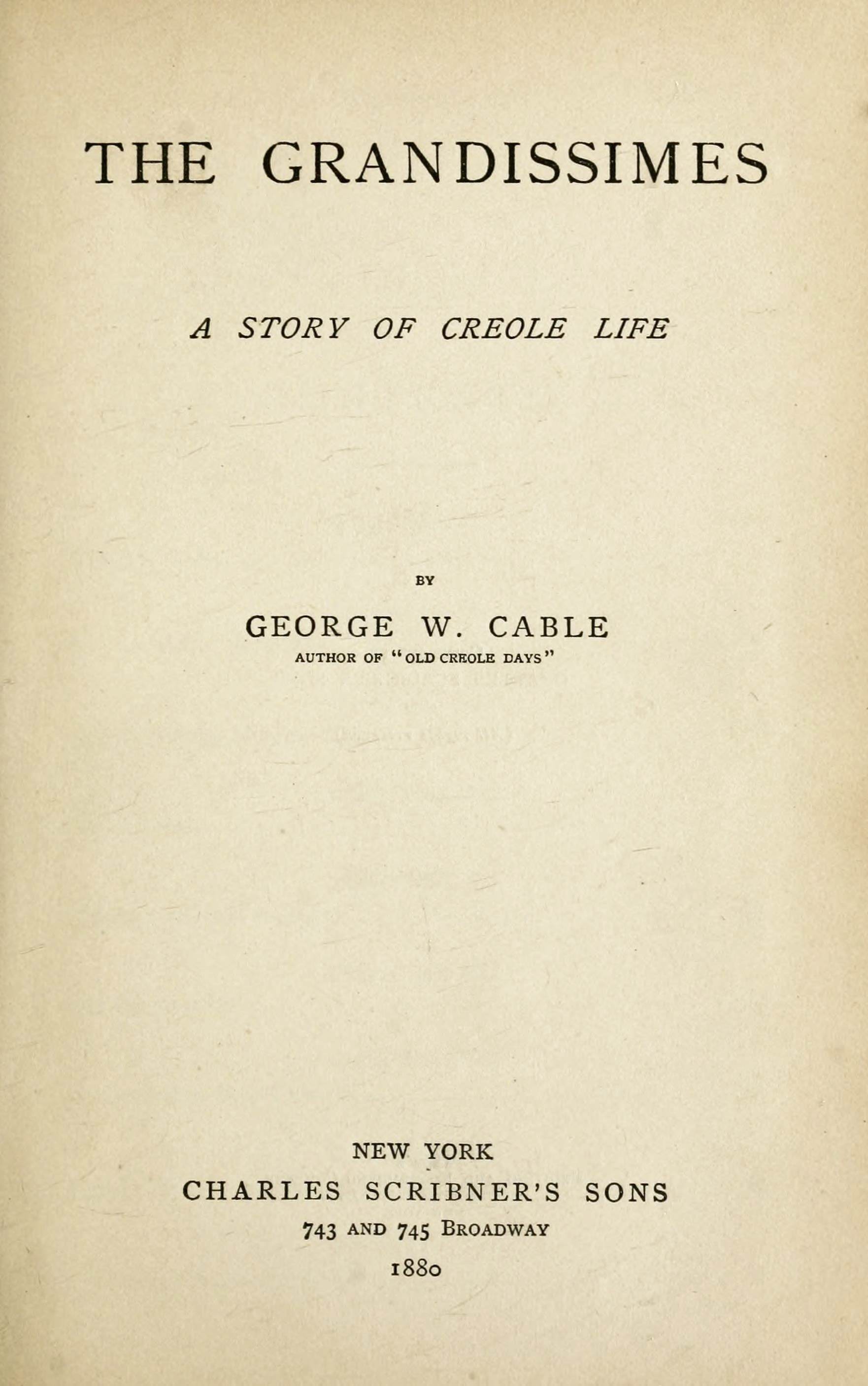
First edition title page

The Grandissimes: A Story of Creole Life is a novel by George Washington Cable, published as a book in 1880 by Charles Scribner's Sons after appearing as a serial in Scribner's. The historical romance depicts race and class relations in New Orleans at the start of the 19th century, immediately following the Louisiana Purchase in 1803. The book examines the lives and loves of the extended Grandissime family, which includes members from different races and classes in Creole society. The novel juxtaposes a romanticized version of the French Creole culture with the atrocities committed under the European-American system of slavery in the United States.

== Key characters ==
- Honoré Grandissime, the head of the French/white part of the prominent Grandissime family of New Orleans
- Honoré Grandissime, the quadroon half-brother of the white Honoré Grandissime
- Joseph Frowenfeld, a Philadelphia native and abolitionist
- Agricola Fusilier, Honoré Grandissime's uncle, who seeks to preserve slavery, the foundation of the European Grandissime family's way of life
- Aurora Nancanou, a destitute widow, whose husband had lost his land to Fusilier in a bet and had been killed by Fusilier in a duel.
- Clotilde Nancanou, Aurora's unmarried daughter, about 17 years old.Lives with Aurora.
- Palmyre, A free quadroon woman, formerly Aurora Nancanou's slave maid.
- Bras Coupé, an enslaved African prince on a Spanish Creole plantation. He and Palmyre had been married for reasons contrived by their masters, but the marriage was never consummated.

== Plot ==
In 1803 New Orleans, the white Honoré Grandissime, head of the French Creole family, befriends newcomer Joseph Frowenfeld, whose family has died of yellow fever. Grandissime describes to Frowenfeld the New Orleans caste system, which has three racial groups. Frowenfeld's desire to end slavery would destroy the labor base of the plantations, revenues from which support city life. Frowenfeld and Grandissime's uncle Agricola Fusilier, soon get into a dispute. Fusilier seeks to preserve the Grandissime way of life, which means continuing slavery.

Frowenfeld decides to stay in New Orleans. Educated in science, he opens an apothecary shop. He befriends Aurora and Clotilde Nancanou. Frowenfeld and Clotilde quickly develop romantic feelings, but do not act on them.

In the street one dark night, Palmyre stabs Fusilier superficially. He recovers, but takes no action against her, because he fears she might use her voodoo on him. Palmyre hates Fusilier because (in a plot line told in flashback) Fusilier had advocated for severe punishment for Palmyre's husband Bras-Coupe, leading to Bras-Coupe's mutilation and death.

The quadroon Honoré Grandissime is in love with Palmyre. He asks Frowenfeld for a love potion to use on her. Frowenfeld (a man of science, not voodoo) declines. The quadroon begins to waste away with unrequited love.

Influenced by Frowenfeld's modern ideals, the white Honoré Grandissime makes two decisions that alienate him from his family: 1) He agrees to go into business with his quadroon half brother, also named Honoré Grandissime. 2) He returns Grandissime property to Aurora Nancanou that had been won in a bet years earlier. Grandissime is secretly in love with Aurora.

Grandissime had previously tried to help Bras-Coupé, a slave married to Palmyre. After Bras-Coupé attacks his white overseer, a mob of Creole aristocrats, including Fusilier, captures the slave. Grandissime tries to intervene, but Bras-Coupé is mutilated, in accordance with the existing slave laws—an act demonstrating the darkness at the heart of their society.

White Creole sentiment turns against Frowenfeld for three reasons: 1) He is an outsider with unpopular abolitionist ideas, 2) He is considered, by the many who don't understand science, to be a sorcerer, and 3) He is an American, and with the recent acquisition of Louisiana by the United States, the Creoles stand to lose their land grants that had been awarded by the previous French and Spanish governments. The result is that a mob destroys Frowenfeld's apothecary. He reopens in a new building, but under the name and protection of a silent partner in the Grandissime family.

By chance, Fusilier and the quadroon Grandissime meet in Frowenfeld's shop. A quadroon is required to take off his hat to a white man, but Grandissime refuses, so Fusilier strikes him with his cane. In the ensuing scuffle, Grandissime stabs Fusilier, and Fusilier is seriously wounded.

As Fusilier tries to recover over the following days, Palmyre tries to thwart the recovery by sneaking (via an accomplice) voodoo tokens into Fusilier's bedroom. The accomplice is caught and killed, but Palmyre evades capture. Fusilier dies.

The quadroon Grandissime secretly arranges for Palmyre's safe passage to Europe, but she still declines to marry him. Despairing of losing Palmyre forever, Grandissime commits suicide.

Frowenfeld and Clotilde finally confess their feelings to each other. The white Grandissime confesses his love to Aurora. The narrative is a bit ambiguous, but it seems likely both couples will marry.

== Adaptations ==
The book is known for its descriptions of local dialects and the practice of plaçage, a recognized extralegal system in which ethnic European men entered into the equivalent of common-law marriages with African and mixed-race women (primarily of African and European descent). Generally the young woman's mother negotiated a dowry, freedom for the woman and her children if she were a slave, and possibly education for her (future) children. Typically young men would have a plaçage arrangement before getting formally married to a wife of European descent; others kept their mixed-race mistresses after marriage. The mixed-race children of such arrangements became the Creoles of color, free people of color who spoke a French-based Creole language, practiced Catholicism, and established a social class or caste between those of the ethnic Europeans and the predominantly-African slaves. Many became artisans and property owners.

The book features an adaptation of the story of Bras-Coupé, the fictitious name of a fugitive slave named Squire who was lynched in 1837.

The novel was adapted for the opera Koanga, with music by Frederick Delius.

Willa Cather's short story "The Dance at Chevalier's" was influenced by Cable's work; it has been described as "a cross between George Washington Cable's The Grandissimes (1880) and Anthony Hope's Prisoner of Zenda (1894)".
