= A Singer's Romance =

1900 short story by Willa Cather

- Short story by Willa Cather
- Country: United States
- Language: English
- Genre: Short story

Publication
- Published in: Cosmopolitan
- Publication type: Women's magazine
- Publication date: July 1900

"A Singer's Romance" is a short story by Willa Cather. It was first published in Cosmopolitan in July 1900.

== Plot summary ==
Frau Schumann drops a bag in an attempt to get a man who has been stalking her to talk to her; he picks up the bag and gives it to her but remains silent. Later, she receives another letter from her husband, asking her for money for his doctor's bills. She knows he only needs the money for gambling as she has already sent him money for his doctor, but she sends him a cheque anyway. Antoinette then asks her if she wants champagne, but she says not as she has stopped drinking it since the stalker has been around - she wants to look good as she thinks he is a secret lover. Later however, she overhears the man telling Antoinette that she will understand if she leaves her, as Frau has been so kind to her. It is clear that the young man is Antoinette's suitor. Distraught, Frau orders a quart of champagne.

== Characters ==
- Frau Selman Schumann, a German opera singer
- Mr Schumann, Frau Schumann's husband. He used to be her singing teacher, and he now gambles away her earnings in Monte Carlo.
- Antoinette, Frau Schumann's maid. A late French opera singer's daughter, she was 'rescued' by Frau Schumann from becoming a chorus girl.
- The Signorino, Antoinette's suitor.

== Allusions to other works ==
- Frau Schumann is compared to a caricature by Aubrey Beardsley, and later to Valkyrie.

== Literary significance and criticism ==
A Singer's Romance was a rewriting of Nanette: An Aside, though with a different stance.
