= Northern Neck Proprietary =

Land grant in colonial Virginia

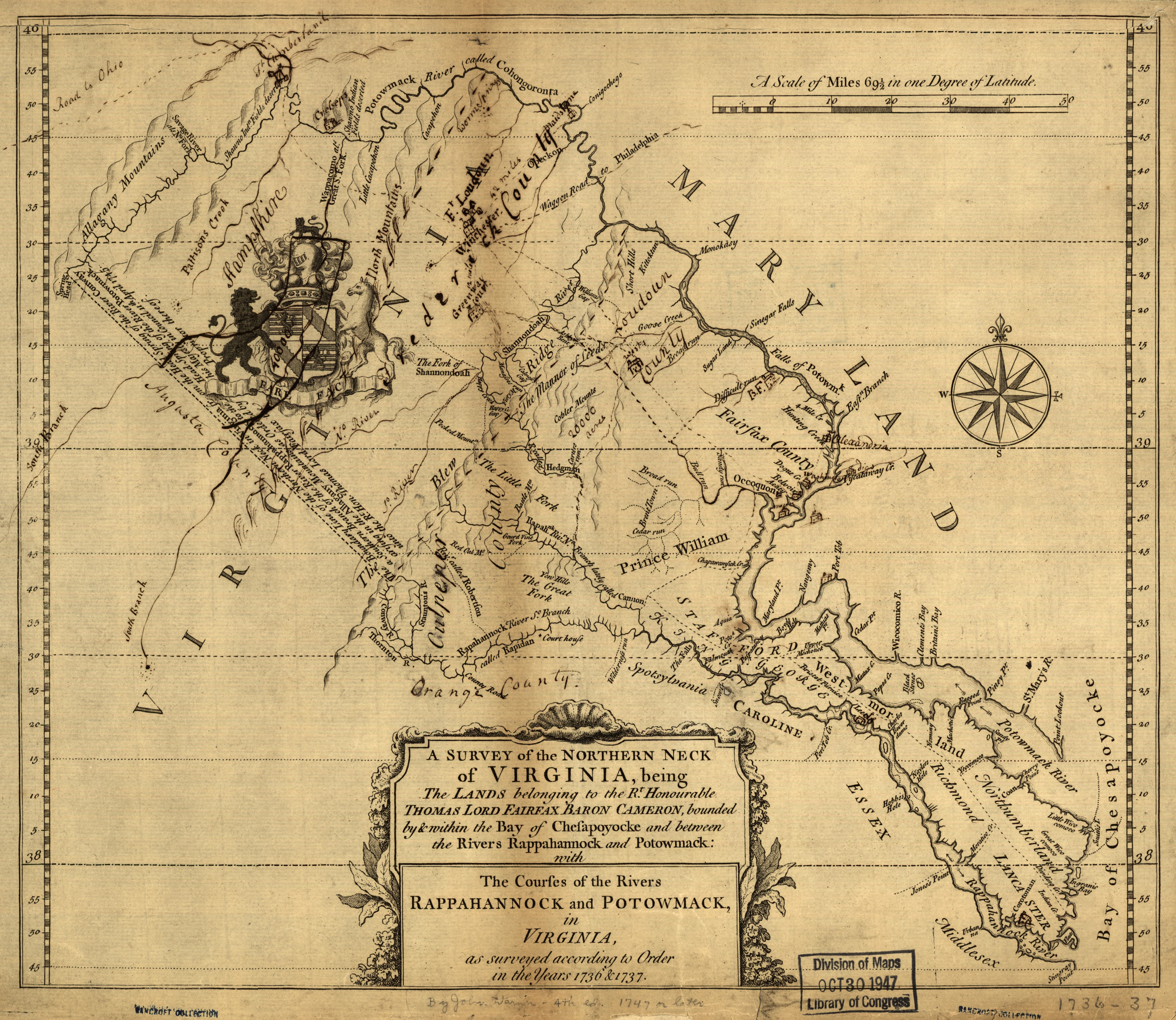
A 1736 map of the Northern Neck Proprietary

The Northern Neck Proprietary – also called the Northern Neck land grant, Fairfax Proprietary, or Fairfax Grant – was a land grant first contrived by the exiled English King Charles II in 1649 and encompassing all the lands bounded by the Potomac and Rappahannock Rivers in colonial Virginia. This constituted up to 5,000,000 acres (20,000 km^{2}) of Virginia's Northern Neck and a vast area northwest of it.

The grant became actual in 1660 when Charles was restored to the English throne. By 1719, these lands had been inherited by Thomas Fairfax, 6th Lord Fairfax of Cameron (1693-1781). By that time, the question of the boundaries of the designated lands had also become highly contentious. It was decided in 1746 that a line between the sources of the North Branch of the Potomac and the Rappahannock River (the "Fairfax Line") would constitute the western limit of Lord Fairfax's lands.

The unsettled portions of his domain were finally confiscated during the American Revolution by the Virginia Act of 1779, and when he died in 1781, the Proprietary effectively ceased to exist. A portion of this estate, however, was later the subject of the landmark Supreme Court case Martin v. Hunter's Lessee (1816).

== History ==
=== 17th century ===
In September 1649, King Charles II of England granted to seven Englishmen all of Virginia between the Rappahannock and Potomac Rivers as a Proprietary. The extent of the grant was hardly recognized by either the King or the grantees because most of it had never even been mapped. The proprietors thought little of their grant since Charles II, due to political struggles in England, was a king without a kingdom.

One of the seven grantees was John Colepeper, 1st Baron Colepeper of Thoresway (1600-1660). Control of the Proprietary came to one man, his son Thomas Colepeper, 2nd Baron Colepeper, who also received a new patent issued by King James II in 1688. Lord Colepeper died the following year. His 5/6th share of the proprietary was inherited by his daughter Catherine Culpeper and her husband Thomas Fairfax, 5th Lord Fairfax of Cameron. While some of the original proprietors' rights had been lost, the collecting of taxes from settlers had been established through the efforts of their agents in Virginia and through Lord Fairfax himself to ensure that the proprietors received their income from their property. After Lord Fairfax died in January 1710, his son Thomas, the 6th Lord, inherited the title and his five-sixths shares in the Northern Neck. In May, his grandmother died leaving the new Lord Fairfax her one-sixth share. Because he was only sixteen years old at the time, the affairs of the Proprietary fell to his mother, Lady Catherine Fairfax. When she died in 1719, the sixth Lord Fairfax came to control all six shares of the proprietary.

As the Virginia government at Jamestown were losing control over a significant portion of Virginia held by Lord Fairfax, the feud between them was significant. The specific issue at this time was the southern and western boundaries of the proprietary. In 1735 Lord Fairfax came to Virginia to see about a survey to settle the matter. The survey was undertaken in 1736, and its results detailed in the Fairfax Stone. The following year, Fairfax returned to England to argue his case before the Privy Council. Before leaving, he rode over much of his domain, and set aside for himself a tract of 12,588 acres (50.94 km^{2}) near Great Falls, in what was to become Fairfax County. A second survey was conducted with great difficulty in 1746. The Fairfax Line established a line between the sources of the Potomac and Rappahannock rivers.

In 1747, Lord Fairfax came back to Virginia, two years after having won his claim before the Privy Council to the most extensive boundaries for the proprietary in exchange for certain land concessions to the Virginia authorities. Virginia had won political control over the proprietary and its inhabitants in the seventeenth century. When Lord Fairfax died in 1781 in Virginia, the proprietary effectively ceased to exist. All the land which had been granted by Lord Fairfax remained in the hands of the grantees; the remainder of ungranted land came under the control of the new Commonwealth of Virginia.

=== Fairfax County ===
Prior to 1649, the entire Northern Neck had been designated by the Assembly as one large county called Northumberland.

In 1653, the majority of the northern portion of Northumberland was named Westmoreland County. In 1664, Stafford County was created from the northern portion of Westmoreland. What is now Fairfax was first in Northumberland, then Westmoreland, and from 1664 to 1730, Stafford.

In 1730, there was a new procedure in which, to create a new county, the Assembly would first create a new parish and then a new county whose boundaries were coterminous with those of the parish. In this manner, Hamilton Parish became Prince William County, Truro Parish became Fairfax County, and Cameron Parish developed into Loudoun County.

The County of Fairfax was created by legislation introduced in May 1742, effective the following December. It was most likely named for Thomas, sixth Lord Fairfax. The dividing line was a line up Occoquan River and Bull Run, and from the head of the main branch of Bull Run, by a straight course to Ashby's Gap in the Blue Ridge. The decision was approved by the council and governor, and it became law 19 June 1742.

The original Fairfax County only lasted until 1757, when the Virginia House of Burgesses passed an act cutting off from it the County of Loudoun. The dividing line between the two counties stood for 41 years, and then in 1798, the General Assembly of Virginia passed an act that provided a new dividing line, one which has remained to the present day as the boundary between Fairfax and Loudoun Counties.

=== 1736 expedition ===
In 1736, three different survey expeditions were organized with all three having representatives of both the Colony of Virginia and of Lord Fairfax. One party was to explore and map the Potomac to its head; this included Major William Mayo and Mr Brookes for the Colony (and King) and Mr Winslow and John Savage for Fairfax. A second party was to explore and map the North Branch of the Rappahannock (Mr Wood, Mr Thomas, Jr) and the final party was to explore and map the South Branches (Rapidan and Conway Rivers) of the Rappahannock (Mr Graeme, Mr Thomas, Sr). All parties consisted of surveyors and commissioners and their works were completed in all three cases.

The work of the three groups and the county surveyors lead to the preparation of a map of the Northern Neck in 1736 and 1737. This map shows the courses of the Potomac and Rappahannock and cites latitudes across the map. What the map does not show, however, is a western boundary line for the grant. A line connecting the head springs of the Potomac with those of the Rappahannock had yet to be surveyed. This was to be the work of Colonel Peter Jefferson and Thomas Lewis — the "Fairfax Line" party — in 1746 and 1747, which finally settled the disputed claims.

==== John Savage ====
John Savage was an 18th-century surveyor who was part of this 1736 expedition. John Savage is the namesake of the Savage River in Maryland.

=== Western Virginia ===
The Fairfax grant extended westward to the boundary with the colony (later state) of Maryland, although much of the western land was unoccupied by colonists at the time. In 1746 surveyors led by Colonel Peter Jefferson (Thomas Jefferson's father) and Thomas Lewis placed the "Fairfax Stone" at the source of the Potomac River, then made an approximately 77-mile line of demarcation known as the "Fairfax Line", extending south-eastward from that Stone to the source of the Rappahannock River. Because the Potomac River initially runs westward from its source, and the state of West Virginia was created during the American Civil War, it now marks the junction of Tucker, Grant and Preston Counties and is in Fairfax Stone Historical Monument State Park.

== See also ==
- Allegheny Mountains
- Diocese of Arlington
