= The Mahogany Tree =

The Mahogany Tree was a weekly literary magazine published from January until December 1892. The magazine was based in Boston.

== Overview ==
The magazine was started by Mildred Aldrich, and it was supposedly "devoted solely to the 'fine arts'." According to a review in The Harvard Crimson its aim was to "give criticisms on books, pictures, music, and acting." It has since been described as "one of the first forums for decadent-aesthetic ideas in the United States."

Contributors comprised Philip Henry Savage, Ralph Adams Cram, Louise Imogen Guiney and F. Holland Day, amongst others. The magazine was the first to publish the work of Willa Cather.
