= George Washington Cable =

American novelist (1844–1925)

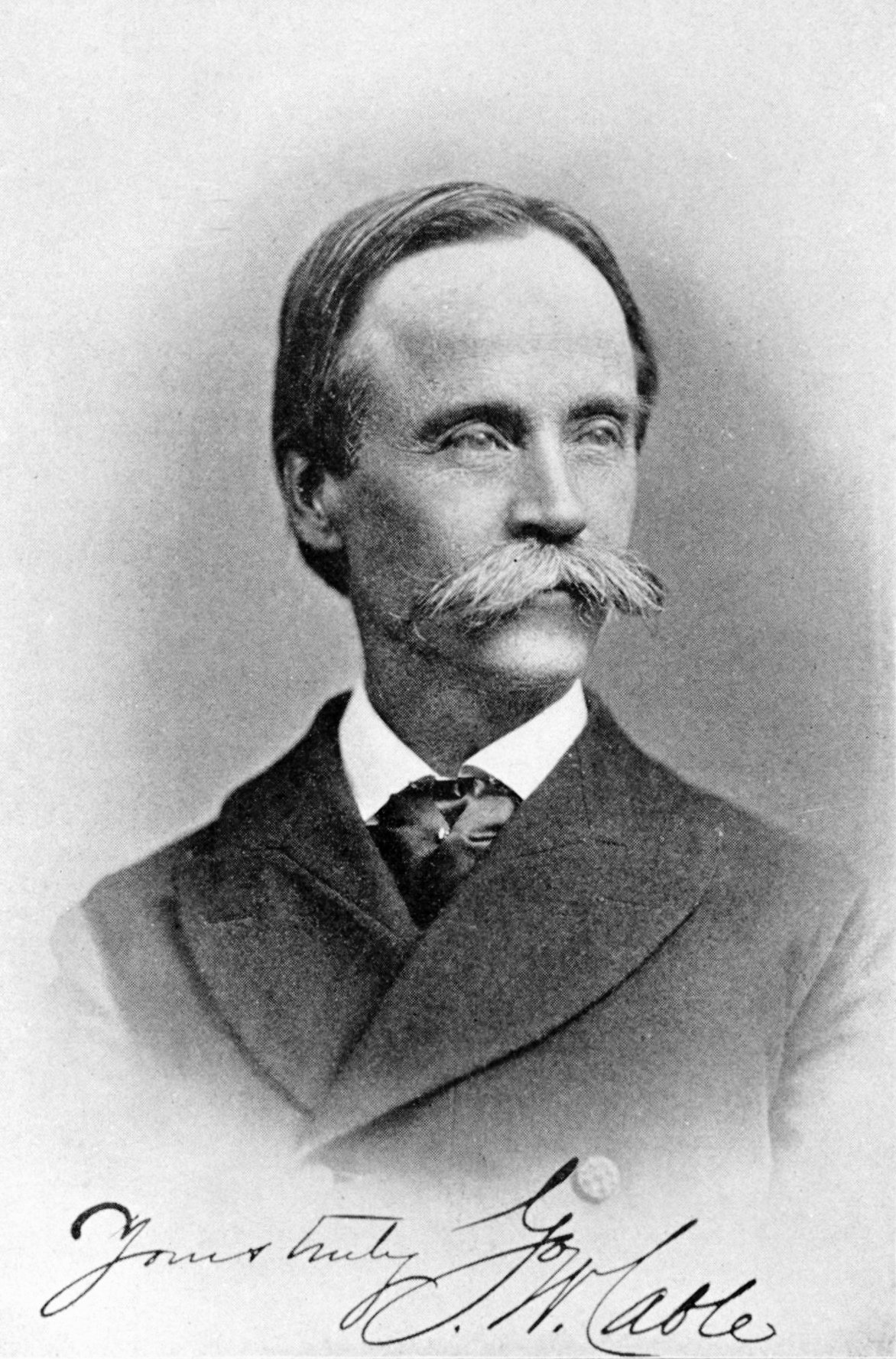
- George Washington Cable in 1903
- Born: October 12, 1844; New Orleans, Louisiana, U.S.
- Died: January 31, 1925 (aged 81); St. Petersburg, Florida, U.S.
- Occupation: Novelist

George Washington Cable (October 12, 1844 – January 31, 1925) was an American novelist notable for the realism of his portrayals of Creole life in his native New Orleans, Louisiana. He has been called "the most important southern artist working in the late 19th century", as well as "the first modern Southern writer". In his treatment of racism, mixed-race families, and miscegenation, his fiction has been thought to anticipate that of William Faulkner.

He also wrote articles critical of contemporary society. Due to hostility against him after two 1885 essays encouraging racial equality and opposing Jim Crow, Cable moved with his family to Northampton, Massachusetts. He lived there for the next thirty years, then moved to Florida.

== Early life ==
George Washington Cable was born in 1844 in New Orleans, Louisiana, to George W. Cable Sr., and Rebecca Boardman Cable. His parents were wealthy slaveholders and members of the Presbyterian Church and of New Orleans society, whose families had moved there after the Louisiana Purchase. First educated in private schools, the younger Cable had to work after his father died young: the elder Cable had lost investments, and the family struggled financially. Young Cable later learned French on his own. Supporting the Confederacy during the American Civil War, he served in the Confederate States Army, enlisting in the 4th Mississippi Cavalry Regiment in October 1863 at age 19.

== Career ==
Cable's experiences changed his ideas about Southern and Louisianan society, and he began writing during a two-year bout with malaria. In 1870, he became a journalist, writing for the New Orleans Picayune. He worked for the newspaper from 1865 to 1879, by which time he had become an established writer. In 1869, George Cable married Louisa Stewart Bartlett, with whom he had several children.

Cable was invited to submit stories to Scribner's Monthly, which published his story "Sieur George" in 1873, a critical and popular success. He published six more stories of Creole life with Scribner's in the following three years. These were collected and published in a book in 1879 as Old Creole Days. While romantic in plot, the stories revealed the multi-cultural and multi-racial nature of antebellum New Orleans society, with ties among French, Spanish, African, Native American, and Caribbean Creoles. He also addressed conflicts that arose following the Louisiana Purchase, when traditional New Orleans Creoles of color had to confront Anglo-Americans — who ultimately asserted their concept of a biracial society, rather than acknowledging the multiracial class of free people of color.

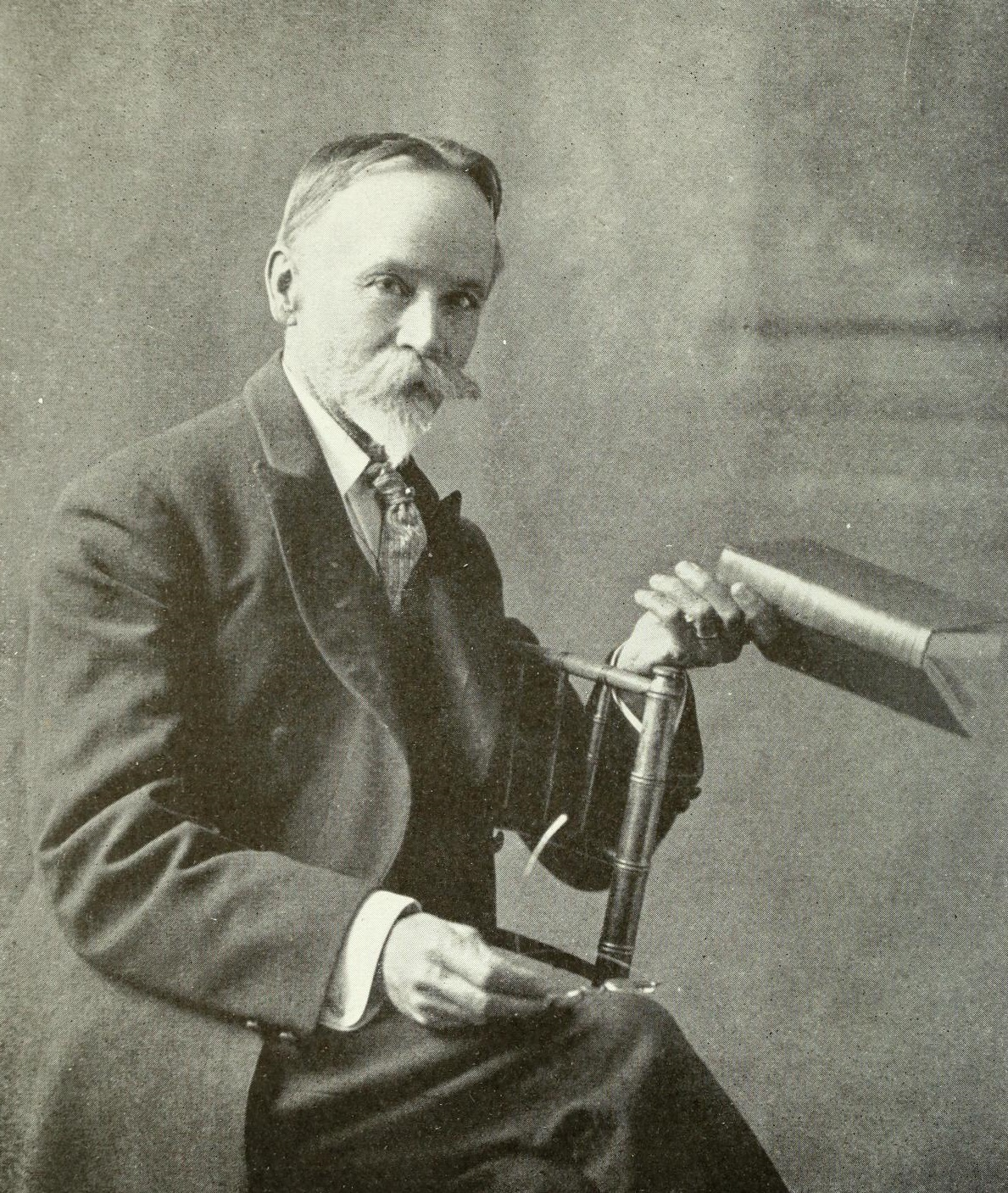
Cable in The Booklovers Magazine, c. 1903

In 1880, Cable published his first novel, The Grandissimes: A Story of Creole Life, portraying multiracial members and different classes of society in the early 1800s shortly after the Louisiana Purchase. It had first been serialized in Scribner's. The plot follows the adventures and romances of several members of the Grandissime family, a French Creole family with mixed-race members. He used this historical romance as a way to explore society and its racial injustice, as he addressed European Creoles, the mixed-race class, plaçage, slavery, and lynchings. In the same year, the United States Census Bureau commissioned Cable to write a "historical sketch" of pre-Civil War New Orleans for a special section of the 10th United States Census' "Social statistics of cities". He submitted a well-researched 313-page history, which was greatly reduced for publication in 1884. A complete edition was not published until 2008.

His novella Madame Delphine (1881), expanded from a short story, featured the issue of miscegenation, in which a woman of partially African descent tries to arrange the marriage of her daughter, who has more European ancestry, to one of the French Creole elite. In 1884 he published a work, Dr. Sevier, on prison reform.

After these works, Cable seemed to split his efforts between romantic novels and non-fiction articles, in which he expressed his support for racial equality and opposition to Jim Crow, such as "The Freedman's Case in Equity" and "The Silent South," both published in 1885. His essays were resented by many white Southerners and generated controversy.

After the end of the American Civil War, white supremacists worked to re-establish political and social supremacy over freedmen and over those who in the antebellum years had been free people of color. The Ku Klux Klan and paramilitary groups practiced racial intimidation and other efforts to dissuade blacks from voting. After Reconstruction, when Democrats regained control of the state legislature, they worked to disenfranchise blacks, and imposed legal racial segregation and other restrictive measures.

So much hostility was expressed against Cable in 1885 that he decided to leave the South. That year, he moved with his family to Northampton, Massachusetts, where he continued to write about the South in novels and critical essays. In 1888, he published Bonaventure, described as an "Acadian pastoral." In total, he published 14 novels and collections of short fiction. His last novel was Lovers of Louisiana (1918).

Cable was elected a member of the American Antiquarian Society in 1888.

Cable's wife Louise died in 1904; and in 1906 he married Eva Stenson. After Eva's death, he married a third time, to Hanna Cowing in 1923. Two years later, Cable himself died, in St. Petersburg, Florida.

== Response and legacy ==
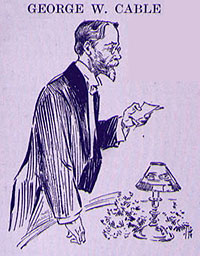
Sketch of Cable in 1905

Cable was friends with Mark Twain, and the two writers did speaking tours together. In 1884 and 1885 they visited Toronto, Canada, twice, on a reading tour known as the "Twins of Genius" tour. Twain said of Cable that "when it comes down to moral honesty, limpid innocence, and utterly blameless piety, the Apostles were mere policemen [compared] to Cable," despite his dark, "indelicate" depictions of society. Twain also mentions Cable in his book Life on the Mississippi:

The party had the privilege of idling through this ancient quarter of New Orleans with the South's finest literary genius, the author of "the Grandissimes." In him the South has found a masterly delineator of its interior life and its history. In truth, I find by experience, that the untrained eye and vacant mind can inspect it and learn of it and judge of it more clearly and profitably in his books than by personal contact with it.

With Mr. Cable along to see for you, and describe and explain and illuminate, a jog through that old quarter is a vivid pleasure. And you have a vivid sense as of unseen or dimly seen things—vivid, and yet fitful and darkling; you glimpse salient features, but lose the fine shades or catch them imperfectly through the vision of the imagination: a case, as it were, of ignorant near-sighted stranger traversing the rim of wide vague horizons of Alps with an inspired and enlightened long-sighted native.

Modern literary historians have said that Cable's treatment of racism in his fiction influenced the later work of William Faulkner and Robert Penn Warren. He has been called "the most important southern artist working in the late 19th century, as well as the first modern southern writer."

In 2008 a new edition of his history of the South, including footnotes and research, was published by Louisiana State University Press under the title, The New Orleans of George Washington Cable: The 1887 Census Office Report, edited and with an introduction by Lawrence N. Powell.

Cable may have coined the term "authors' editor", in his 1910 tribute to his editor Richard Watson Gilder, when he wrote "I think he was peculiarly an authors' editor, and not merely a publishers'."; this is the earliest known use of the term in print.

== Works ==
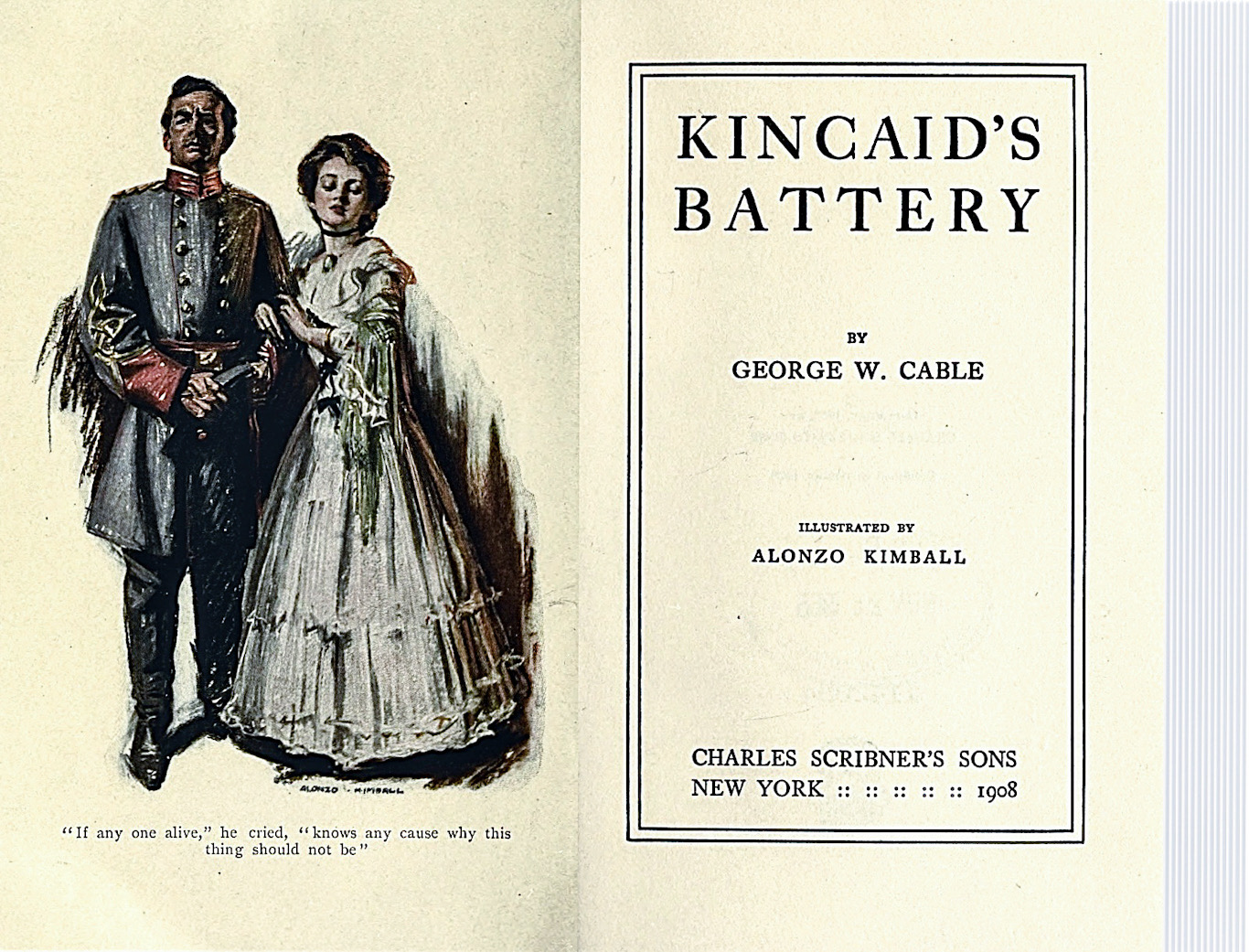
Title page of Kincaid's Battery (1908) with frontispiece by Alonzo Myron Kimball

- Old Creole Days (1879)
- The Grandissimes: A Story of Creole Life (1880)
- Madame Delphine (1881)
- Dr. Sevier (1882)
- The Creoles of Louisiana (1884)
- Bonaventure (1888)
- The Silent South (1889)
- The Negro Question (1890)
- Strange True Stories of Louisiana (1890)
- The Busy Man's Bible and How to Study and Teach It (1891)
- A Memory of Roswell Smith (1892)
- Famous Adventures and Prison Escapes of the Civil War (1893)
- John March, Southerner (1894)
- Strong Hearts (1899)
- The Cavalier (1901)
- Bylow Hill (1902)
- Kincaid's Battery (1908)
- Possen Jone' and Pere Raphael (1909)
- The Amateur Garden (1914)
- Gideon's Band (1914)
- The Flower of the Chapdelaines (1917)
- Lovers of Louisiana (1918)

== See also ==
- George Washington Cable House
- Lyle Saxon, a later Louisiana writer and bon vivant
