= The Fear That Walks by Noonday =

1894 short story by Willa Cather

"The Fear That Walks By Noonday"
- Short story by Willa Cather
- Country: United States
- Language: English
- Genre: Short story

Publication
- Published in: The Sombrero
- Publication type: University yearbook
- Publication date: 1894

"The Fear That Walks By Noonday" is a short story by Willa Cather. It was first published in The Sombrero, a yearbook published by the University of Nebraska in 1894.

== Plot summary ==
A team of football players have a talk before a game against the 'Injuns'. In the previous matchup between the two teams, one of the opposing team players was fatally injured. Once the teams take the field, an unusual coldness comes over the playing field and a number of unexplained events take place. One player, Fred, passes out. Later, at the post-game dinner, a very morose atmosphere hangs over the proceedings. The story ends on a very different note when Reggie yells out McKinley's political victory.

== Characters ==
- Frederick Hurton
- Regiland Harton
- Morrison
- Chum-Chum, a girl.
- The coach
- Policemen

== Allusions to actual history ==
- William McKinley's re-election as Governor of Ohio in 1893 is mentioned.

== Literary significance and criticism ==
- The theme of a football game was suggested to Cather by Dorothy Canfield Fisher.
- It has been described as 'a highly conventional ghost story'.
