= A Son of the Celestial =

- Short story by Willa Cather
- Language: English
- Genre: Short Story

Publication
- Published in: The Hesperian
- Publication type: Student newspaper
- Publication date: January 15, 1893

"A Son of the Celestial" is a short story by Willa Cather. It was first published on 15 January 1893 in The Hesperian.

== Plot summary ==
In San Francisco, Yung and Ponter share their penchant for both Sanskrit and opium. When Yung fails to understand Hamlet by William Shakespeare, Ponter blames the Chinese man for being heathen. As requested, after Yung's death, Ponter sends him back to China.

== Characters ==
- Yung Le Ho, a white-haired Chinese man who lives in San Francisco. Although he was born in Nanking, he moved to India and finally to the United States. He understands Sanskrit and makes opium. He runs a bazaar for a living.
- Ponter, a Professor of Sanskrit. He now works in a boarding-house and as an amanuensis for a lawyer. He likes to smoke opium.

== Allusions to other works ==
- Painting is mentioned through Michelangelo
- Religious texts are mentioned through The Bible, Buddha, Confucius, and Vishnu.
- Plato is also mentioned.
- There is a quotation taken from Horace's Odes.

== Allusions to actual history ==
- The Chinese Treaty of 1880 is mentioned.
