= Richard Kidder Meade (colonel) =

American army officer

Richard Kidder Meade (July 14, 1746 – February 9, 1805) was an American army officer from Nansemond County, Virginia. He served as an aide-de-camp to General George Washington during the American Revolutionary War.

== Early life ==
Born in Prince George County, to the former Susannah Everard and her planter husband David Meade (1700-1787), His maternal grandmother was Susannah Kidder Everard, Lady Everard and her husband Sir Richard Everard, 4th Baronet, was the last Governor of North Carolina under proprietary rule. His great-great-grandfather was Richard Kidder, a noted theologian who was the Bishop of Bath and Wells.

Meade and two of his brothers were educated at Harrow, one of the oldest and most respected schools in England.

== Career ==
In October 1775, Meade was commissioned captain of the 2nd Virginia Regiment. He led a company at the Battle of Great Bridge near Chesapeake, Virginia, arguably the first Revolutionary War battle in the state of Virginia. Meade also raised troops in Brunswick County in the Southampton Military District (later designated as the 4th Virginia Regiment on the Continental Line) who served under Col. William Woodford. In March 1777, General Washington appointed him one of his aides-de-camps, with the rank of lieutenant colonel. Meade was frequently used to deliver important dispatches and orders. Alexander Hamilton did the "head work" for Washington while he did the riding. He was with Washington during all of the major battles between 1777 and 1780, and supervised the execution of Major John Andre. In November 1780, Meade left Washington's staff to get married for the second time. While in Virginia he aided General von Steuben in repelling an attack of British forces under Benedict Arnold.

In the 1780s, Meade bought a large tract of land in then-developing Frederick County near White Post (now in Clarke County), and expanded an existing log cabin into "Meadea." He operated that farm and racing stable using enslaved labor, paying taxes in 1787 on 10 enslaved adults, 7 teenagers, 21 horses, 19 cattle and a 4 wheeled chariot. About 1791, Meade built another house nearby of brick, which he named "Lucky Hit."

== Personal life ==
Meade's first wife was Elizabeth Randolph, a daughter of burgess and patriot Richard Randolph (1721-1786) of Curles Neck Plantation in Henrico County, but she died in 1774 and none of their children survived. On December 10, 1780, Meade married his second wife, Mary Grymes Randolph, the widow of William Randolph of Chatsworth. They had 4 daughters and 4 sons, including William Meade, who became the third Episcopal Bishop of Virginia. His daughter Ann Randolph Meade Page was an Episcopal slavery reformer. Complicating matters, Richard Kidder Meade Jr. (1803-1862), a U.S. Representative from Virginia, was the son of a cousin of the same name, Richard Kidder Meade (1775-1832).

== Death and legacy ==
Meade died in 1805 apparently from the effects of gout and years of military life. Both Meadea and Lucky Hit remain, and are now listed on the National Register of Historic Places.

== See also ==
- Randolph family of Virginia
- First Families of Virginia
