= William Hallifax =

English clergyman and explorer (1655–1721/22)

- Born: 15 August 1655; Springthorpe, Lincolnshire, England
- Died: 1 January 1722 (aged 66)
- Resting place: St Michael's Church, Salwarpe, Worcestershire; 52°15′23.8″N 2°11′06.5″W
- Education: Corpus Christi College, Oxford
- Known for: Translation of Euclid; exploration of Palmyra
- Title: Doctor of Divinity
- Spouse(s): Anne Hill; Mary Davenport
- Children: William Hallifax

William Hallifax was an English clergyman notable for being an early western explorer of Palmyra, a translation of Euclid, serving as Chaplain to the Speaker of the House of Commons and as a benefactor of Corpus Christi College, University of Oxford.

== Personal life and education ==
William Hallifax was the second son of the Revd John Hallifax and his wife, Elizabeth Mabelye. He was born on 15 August 1655 and baptised on 24 September at Springthorpe, Lincolnshire. He was admitted to Brasenose College, University of Oxford as a servitor on 20 February 1670. He was subsequently admitted as a scholar to Corpus Christi College, University of Oxford in April 1674, graduating with a BA in 1675 with an MA in 1678. He was elected a Fellow of Corpus Christi in December 1682, publishing a translation of Les Elemens d'Euclide by Claude Dechales in 1685.

In 1687, he gained a BD and was elected chaplain to the Levant Company in Aleppo, remaining there until 1695, the same year in which he was awarded a DD. He was chaplain to the Speaker of the House of Commons, Paul Foley, from 1695 to 1698. In 1699 he was presented to the living of Oldswinford, Worcestershire by Thomas Foley and, from 1712, held the living of Salwarpe in plurality until he died at the beginning of 1722. He made a generous bequest to Corpus Christi College.

Hallifax was twice married. He and Anne Hill ((c. 1676-14 May 1709); daughter of Revd John Hill) were married at St Michael's, Stoke Prior, Worcestershire on 24 March 1702. There were no children of this marriage and Anne died on 4 May 1709, being buried with a commemorative stone at St Michael's church, Upton Warren, Worcestershire. Hallifax married Mary Davenport (born of Henry Davenport and Elizabeth on 24 March 1674 at Worfield, Shropshire) on 9 February 1710 at Kinver, Staffordshire. There was one child, William Hallifax (baptised 2 December 1714) who was buried at Salwarpe church on 11 April 1721. (Note: Mary Hallifax then married the Revd Prideaux Sutton, rector of Bredon, at St. Michael's in Bedwardine in Worcester on 18 July 1727. She was buried on 28 March 1754 at Salwarpe, expressing the wish that she be placed "as near as may be to the Grave of my former husband Doctor Hallifax and my late Son there". Prideaux Sutton, Mary's second husband, had died on 3 February 1749 and been buried (10 February 1749) at St. Mary's, Elmley Castle with a verbose memorial at St Giles' church, Bredon.)

== Translation of Milliet Dechales's Les Elemens d'Euclide ==
In 1677, Claude François Milliet Dechales published Les elemens d'Euclide expliquez d'une maniere nouvelle & tres-facile, a French translation of Books 1-6 and 11-12 of Euclid's Elements. Two English translations were published in 1685: one dedicated to Samuel Pepys by Reeve Williams (an engraver and teacher who kept a mathematics school, known for navigation); the other credited to William Hallifax. Hallifax's translations ran into seven editions, the last being published in 1726. There is no statement in any edition of his role as translator but it is attested in two near contemporary sources: Anthony à Wood's 1691 Athenæ oxonienses attempts to list all writers and bishops who were Oxford graduates, stating that "He [Hallifax] hath translated from French into English, The Elements of Euclid explain'd, in a new, but most easie method." Thomas Hearne noted that "He [Hallifax] translated De Chale's Euclid, whereof there are two or three impressions." In his preface, Hallifax said of his translation that "[I] voluntary [sic] offer it to the publick, in an Age, whose Genius seems more addicted to Mathematicks, than any that has preceded it." If number of editions is a measure, Hallifax's was the more successful: a copy of the first edition reached the library of Thomas Foley, later to be Hallifax's patron. Further editions were published, finishing with the seventh edition in 1726. (Note: Simpkins states that no copy of the fifth edition has been found. This is incorrect with copies in the Bodelian Library, The Institution of Engineering and Technology Library and Chetham's Library. E-copies are available for the second, third, sixth, and seventh editions.)

== Chaplain to the Levant Company ==
Hallifax was elected chaplain to the Levant Company in Aleppo by ballot (having preached a sermon to the Company in London) on 18 January 1688, arriving in Aleppo in October 1688 and leaving the post on 27 November 1695, returning to London in 1696 via a winter stop in Rome. There was the expected round of religious duties, not always supported by the Company; the Aleppo Consul's request of 27 January 1692 for a contribution to adorning the chapel being turned down by the Company.

The services followed the Book of Common Prayer of 1662 (ie, the revision that took place during Charles II's reign). Observance was not particularly strict: on 5 November 1688, the colony did not observe the Thanksgiving Day (for deliverance from the Gunpowder Plot), "the whole Nation (as it had been their custom, and I presume is still) going abroad and diverting themselves with Hunting and other Pastimes from morning till night." The Consul said that other observances such as the Martyrdom of Charles I were sometimes kept and sometimes neglected. These lax practices would cause Hallifax difficulty later in his career.

Scholarship was also a recognised activity. There was a library from the beginning of the Company's presence in Aleppo, including both theological and non-theological works. with funds allocated from time to time. In Hallifax's time, £20 was granted by the Company to the chaplain for the library (20 August 1689).

Aleppo was well situated for interaction with a number of communities of scholarship (Ottomans, Greeks, Armenians, Jacobites, Copts, and various groups of Jews and Arabs) with a history of manuscript production. A recent predecessor as chaplain to Aleppo, Robert Huntington, had collected manuscripts extensively with many finding their way to the Bodleian Library or Trinity College Dublin, where Narcissus Marsh was Provost. By the time Hallifax was in Aleppo, Huntington had become Provost of Trinity College Dublin and Marsh had become Bishop of Ferns and Leighlin. Nonetheless, March commissioned Hallifax to supply manuscripts to him, and Bodley's Librarian, Thomas Hyde, commissioned him to find a number of specific books (generally without success). Some insight into what Hallifax was able to collect is provided in his will where he bequeathed an Italian Bible "and all other my Books and Manuscripts in that language amongst which some are of Curiosity and also an Alcoran a Manuscript and another small Manuscript in the persian language being a version of part of the Psalms of David".

== Exploration of Palmyra ==
The merchants of the Levant Company "being generally Men of more than ordinary Birth and Education, have not been wanting (as the intervals of leisure from the gainful Traffick would permit) to make Voyages of Curiosity, to visit the celebrate Remains of Antiquity in those Parts, whereby the once flourishing State of the World, under the Roman Empire is abundantly envinced." The first attempt took place in 1678 with a party of "sixteen English" and about twenty-five muleteers and servants. This group included the merchants Timothy Lanoy and Aaron Goodyear and the chaplain, Robert Huntington. The expedition reached Palmyra but was robbed by the inhabitants and, in fear of their lives, had to return to Aleppo.

The successful expedition of 1691 was both better armed and had assurances of safe passage and a guide from the local emir 'Assyne Abbas' (Husayn Abbas). The group numbered about thirty, including servants. Lanoy and Goodyear were part of the group and their report to the Royal Society gives an extensive account of the travelling but little description of Palmyra. Hallifax, as Huntington's successor was in the party and contributed a separate report to the Royal Society. A panoramic view of Palmyra in also given in the Philosophical Transactions, following Lanoy and Goodyear's paper. This view is very similar to a later painting of a panoramic view of Palmyra by G. Hofstede van Essen sent in 1693 to Gisbert Cuper, a historian and politician, in Amsterdam. The similarity of the engraving in the Philosophical Transactions and Van Essen's painting has been taken as possible evidence that Van Essen was in the expedition party.

Hallifax's report in the Philosophical Transactions made two substantial contributions: a description of the main building in the ruins of Palmyra; a record of inscriptions found on some buildings. The architectural descriptions have the virtue of an attempt at a systematic account of the central ruins and the drawback that Hallifax tried to interpret the function of the buildings based in part on reasoning drawn from the Old Testament. The quality of Hallifax's record of inscriptions is a matter of debate. Those published are in Greek – Hallifax stated he also found one in Latin. He recorded only one inscription in the Palmyrene script which was a hinderance to progress in the study of the languages of the region. The transcription of the Greek inscriptions was questioned almost immediately by Edmond Halley. Hallifax had the disadvantage that he did not have the resources of a well-stocked library to aid him in interpreting what he read on stonework in poor condition and that his transcriptions had themselves been copied and circulated before publication, not necessarily with complete accuracy. The inscriptions were further interpreted by Abednego Seller in his history of Palmyra presented to the Royal Society on 14 October 1696. Given the dependence on Hallifax's paper, it is somewhat unexpected that Seller only directly mentions Hallifax once and then to state of inscription sixteen that Hallifax "confesses he is not overconfident that it was rightly taken".

== Chaplain to the Speaker ==
Paul Foley was speaker of the House of Commons from 1695 to 1698. The Foleys were an old puritan family with Paul's brother, Thomas, having the patronage of several livings in north east Worcestershire. Samuel Barton was Chaplain to the Speaker of the House of Commons from 1695 (the year of Paul Foley's election as Speaker) to 1697. Thomas Hearne described Barton as being "a little Puritanically inclin'd". As was customary, Parliament had petitioned the monarch for a preferment for the Speaker's Chaplain at the end of their tenure and Barton was appointed Prebendary of Westminster Abbey. Hallifax was appointed Chaplain in 1697, being described by Hearne as "of the same Puritanical stamp as ye former [ie Barton]". On 8 June 1698, the House of Commons petitioned William III for a preferment for Hallifax. Hearne noted: "tho' the House petition'd for him, yet 'twas his Fortune to get nothing whereas one Galloway, originally of Hart-Hall, who was a most notorious stupid Blockhead, without one Grain of Learning, for being Foley's Chaplain, when Speaker, got to be Prebendary of Worcester; wch to ye scandal of all Worthy men he still enjoys." Barton and Hallifax seem to have been on good terms as Barton left £20 to "my Loving friend Doctor William Hallifax".

== Parish ministry in Oldswinford and Salwarpe ==
William Hallifax was not Thomas Foley's first choice as rector for the wealthy parish of Oldswinford; in June 1699 it had been offered to and refused by George Nelson, at that time holding the livings of Oddingley and Pedmore. Foley moved quickly to offer the living to Hallifax who was installed on 17 August 1699.

The rectory at Oldswinford was in a poor state by 1699. On 12 June 1700, Hallifax was granted a licence to demolish the "old parsonage-house" and build a replacement, 40 feet wide by 34 feet in breadth. The replacement in red brick is of two storeys with five flat-headed windows and a moulded wood doorcase with Ionic columns and open pediment, although somewhat extended in later years.

1700-1701 saw a substantial disagreement about the powers and role of the lower house of the Convocation of the Church of England. This can be broadly summarised as a difference of opinion between the balance of authority and power between the bishops of the Church of England and the clergy. The lower house's role had been restricted thereby denying a voice to the low church (or puritan) interest which advocated a less ritualistic devotion. In December 1700, the Diocese of Worcester elected two proctors to attend the lower house as representative of the clergy. Previous practice had been for clergy to gather for a vote in person although the difficulty of travel in winter together with the distances of travel meant that many clergy did not attend to cast a vote. In 1700, clergy were allowed to vote by proxy with the outcome favouring the more high church faction and alienating those clergy of a more puritan outlook.

Hallifax was soon embroiled in controversy. (Note: There are three surviving documents in this controversy. 1: a letter written by Hallifax entitled To the Reverend Mr. James Stillingfleet, M.A. Rector of Hortlebury; And Mr. William Lloyd. M.A. Vicar of Blockley; Proctors of the Clergy of the Diocese of Worcester, for the ensuing Convocation. This has not survived independently but is reproduced as page 8 of the following publication. 2: A response to Hallifax's letter entitled: A letter to a clergyman in the City, concerning the instructions lately given to the proctors, for the clergy of the diocese of Worcester. 3: A printed sermon given by Hallifax to which is appended: A answer to a late Libel, entituled A letter to a clergyman in the City ....) He had anonymously penned a letter (seemingly on behalf of those gathered in person at the election in 1700) to the Proctors of the Diocese of Worcester purporting to express the wishes of the parochial clergy as to how their proctors should represent them, taking an essentially latitudinarian view. Unsurprisingly, this letter became the focus of discontent about the process and outcome of the election. The low and high church clergy felt they had been disenfranchised by the novel use of proxies in the vote. A truly anonymous pamphlet was published in early 1701 systematically attempting to refute the substance of Hallifax's letter and it is clear from that and from Hallifax's later response in the form of a published sermon that there had been considerable discussion in the Diocese about the use of proxies and the outcome of the election.

Apart from the intellectual arguments, the pamphlet all but identified Hallifax as the author of the original letter: "Since Dr. H------ x is notoriously known to produce it, and has Assurance enough to acknowledge his Delivery of it to the Chancellor. ... However, he's still D. D. and a Rector of a large Parish..." Hallifax preached a sermon on 30 January 1701 (the Martyrdom of Charles I) which was published with a response to the anonymous pamphlet. Hallifax's response gave particular attention to his failure while in Aleppo to observe the days for the Martyrdom of Charles I and Thanksgiving Day (for deliverance from the Gunpowder Plot) suggesting that he had been attacked for his disloyalty to the monarch as head of the Church of England. It was claimed that he favoured the abolition of the observance of the Martyrdom of Charles I and was, it was implied, dismissed from the Levant Company for disloyalty to the monarch. This was made into a serious matter as Hallifax was forced to obtain a statement from the Levant Company to prove that he had not been dismissed from the position of chaplain in Aleppo and, by inference, he had not favoured the abolition of the observance of the Martyrdom of Charles I.

There was no obvious longer term effect of this controversy although Hallifax did not seem to enter into the life of the Diocese in any substantial way thereafter.

William Hallifax was appointed a governor of King Edward VI's School in 1700 in succession to a local resident and Justice of the Peace, Francis Clare.

Hallifax was instituted as rector of Salwarpe (which he held in pluraility with Oldswinford) on 18 July 1713. He chose to bury his son there and to be himself buried there.

== Investment in the South Sea Company ==
The South Sea Company was created to trade with the "South Seas" and South America. The Treaty of Utrecht gave the Company from 1713 the right to trade up to 4,800 slaves (taken from Africa) for up to thirty years. The financial performance of the Company was uneven but, in 1719, its shares became very profitable and, by June 1719, Mary Hallifax was negotiating on William's behalf with her brother, Henry Davenport. They wished to buy shares but could raise only about £250 of the £300 needed for a share purchase. Davenport supplied the balance and the shares were purchased. A dividend failed to be paid at Christmas 1719. Davenport advised the sale of the shares but Hallifax thought otherwise although he then gave Henry permission to sell if he thought that was the best course of action. Davenport sold the shares almost doubling Hallifax's initial investment but South Sea stocks subsequently rose substantially in value leading to recriminations between the Hallifaxs and Henry Davenport. Nonetheless, at his death, Hallifax still owned some of the shares. It is hard to believe that William Hallifax was not aware that the South Sea Company traded slaves but this did not seem to conflict with his understanding of the gospel.

== Death and bequest to Corpus Christi College, Oxford ==
Hallifax died on 1 January 1722 and was commemorated on a stone within the altar rail at Salwarpe church. (Note: The memorial was recorded by Thomas Habington and included by Peter Prattinton in his notes on Salwarpe church. The inscription reads: Subtus iacet | Reverendus admodam Ver Gulielmus Hallifax S.T.P. Parochiarum de Old | Swinford et Salwarp in Comitatu | Wigorn Rector qui hanc vitam Commutavit in Meliorem Kalendis | Januarii Anno Domini 1721. | Anno Aetis sua 66. [Lies beneath Reverend William Hallifax S.T.P. Rector of the parishes of Old Swinford and Salwarp in the County of Worcestershire who changed this life into a better first January 1721 in his 66th year. (The inscription used the then current dating system where New Year's day was officially on Lady Day (25 March).)]). Hallifax's will is quite extensive leaving £5 to the poor of the parishes of Oldswinford and of Salwarpe and rather more generous bequests to some relatives. His gifts to his former Oxford college of Corpus Christi were extensive and drew on items he had acquired while chaplain at Aleppo or in Italy on his way home. He left a Bible in Italian and about forty manuscripts in Italian, a Quran and a manuscript of some of the Psalms of David in Persian. He left coins and medals which have been transferred to the Ashmolean Museum. The major item was the Hallifax Bowl, a seventeenth century silver-gilt bowl with two handles and roundel portraits (made to look like ancient coins) set into the bowl so that both sides can be seen. Some of these roundels are ancient Roman coins while other are later imitations. The whole was probably made in Poland or Lithuania and found its way to Aleppo where Hallifax stated in his will that he had purchased it.

The will provides some insight into Hallifax's beliefs, requiring that he be buried "after the manner of the Established Church of England in the Communion of which Church I <desire and> Steadfastly resolve thro' the Assistance of divine grace to dye esteeming it to Approach the nearest to the primitive Church of Christ of any that is now in the world." (Note: Donald Gray tries to construct an account of Hallifax's religious beliefs based on the bequest in Hallifax's will of "my Hallian Bible in folio and all other my Books and Manuscripts in that language". Gray speculates that Hallifax's "ideal of a primitive church reflects perhaps a response to the impact of German pietism, whose influence had spread across protestant Europe from its centre at Halle". There is no evidence that Hallifax had any books in German; those bequeathed to Corpus Christi College were in Italian. It seems more likely that "Hallian" is an error in the transcription of the will (as held in The National Archives) and the original text read: "my Italian Bible in folio and all other my Books and Manuscripts in that language".)

Hallifax's library was sold at Worcester by James Fletcher of The Turl, Oxford, together with those of William Worth, John Price (who served as the Chancellor of the Diocese of Worcester) and others. The sale took place from 23 September 1754, a few months after the death of Mary Hallifax, his second wife.

== Notes ==
Church of England titles
Preceded by Simon Ford	Rector of St Mary's Oldswinford; 1699 –1722	Succeeded by George Wigan
