= George Wigan =

- Born: 1692; Kensington, Middlesex, England
- Died: 11 November 1776 (aged 82–83); Oldswinford, Worcestershire, England
- Resting place: St Mary's Church, Oldswinford, Worcestershire
- Parent(s): William Wigan, Mary Sonds
- Relatives: John Wigan (physician)

George Wigan (c1692 – 11 November 1776) was a tutor at Christ Church, Oxford then rector of St Mary's, Oldswinford in Worcestershire.

George Wigan was born at Kensington, oldest son of William Wigan and Mary (née Sonds) to survive to adulthood and brother of John Wigan. He was educated at Westminster School and Christ Church, Oxford, matriculating on 9 June 1711 at the age of 18. He was awarded his BA, 1715; MA, 1718; DD (by diploma) 19 June 1749. Wigan was ordained deacon by George Hooper, Bishop of Bath and Wells (20 December 1719).

== Career ==
Wigan remained at Christ Church as a tutor. One of his students was John Wesley who wrote to his mother on 23 September 1723 reporting that “Mr Wigan had resigned his pupils and was retired into the country to one of his livings.” Wesley goes on to note that “The small-pox and fever are now very common in Oxford; of the latter a very ingenious young gentleman of our College died yesterday, being the fifth day from the beginning of his illness. There is not any other in the College sick at present, and it is hoped that the approach of winter will stop the spreading of the distemper.”.

George Wigan was resident rector of Oldswinford, Worcestershire, from 1722 until death and non-resident rector of Ashbury, formerly in Berkshire also from 1722 to death (conferred by Bishop Hooper), the previous incumbent having died of smallpox. Wigan acted as steward at the annual Anniversary of the Sons of the Clergy service at St Paul's Cathedral on 12 December 1723.

The early eighteenth century antiquarian Thomas Hearne attributed a number of publications to George Wigan. In 1722, Hearne attributed the editing of a volume of John Ernest Grabe's Septuagint which included authoring its Prolegomena. Wigan is variously credited with editing volume 3 or volume 4 but there is no indication of his contribution in either volume. (It is more probable that he contributed to volume 3 which was published after Grabe's death.) Hearne also claimed that George Wigan was admitted as Principal of New Inn Hall, Oxford. In fact, it was John Wigan.

George Wigan did not marry, living out his life at Oldswinford and being buried there on 16 November 1776. For part of that time, his unmarried sister, Mary, lived at Oldswinford. She was buried there on 26 July 1763.

Church of England titles
Preceded by William Hallifax	Rector of St Mary's Oldswinford; 1699 –1722	Succeeded by Thomas Foley
