= John Wigan =

John Wigan may refer to:

- John Wigan (physician) (1696–1739), British physician, poet and medical author
- John Tyson Wigan (1872–1952), British politician and army officer
