= Sir Richard Everard, 4th Baronet =

British soldier and colonial official

His Excellency Sir Richard Everard

4th Governor of North Carolina
- In office 17 July 1725 – 25 February 1731
- Monarchs: George I; George II
- Preceded by: George Burrington
- Succeeded by: George Burrington

Personal details
- Born: June 24, 1683 Great Waltham, England
- Died: February 17, 1733 (aged 49) London, England
- Spouse: Susannah Kidder

Sir Richard Everard, 4th Baronet (24 June 1683 – 17 February 1733) was a British soldier and colonial official who served as the fourth governor of North Carolina from 1725 to 1731.

== Early life and career ==
Everard was born on 24 June 1683 at Langleys, Much Waltham (now called Great Waltham) in Essex, the eldest son of Sir Hugh Everard and his wife, Mary Browne. He became a captain in the British Army, and may have taken part in the capture of Gibraltar in 1704. He served in the garrison there for eighteen months before returning to Britain.

In January 1706, following the death of his father, he succeeded to the Everard baronetcy at which point he resigned his commission. On 13 June 1706, he married Susannah Kidder, the daughter and co-heiress of Richard Kidder, Bishop of Bath and Wells. In 1710, in order to clear debts, he sold the family estate at Langleys to Samuel Tufnell. He then bought a more modest house at Broomfield Green.

== Governor of North Carolina ==
Coat of Arms of Richard Everard

The previous governor, George Burrington, had been removed from office in 1725 by the Lords Proprietors, following many complaints by colonists about his behavior (Burrington was known principally for physically threatening other North Carolina officials).

Everard petitioned for the position, was granted it, and sailed for America. He was sworn in on 17 July 1725 as "governor, captain general, admiral, and commander-in-chief of the colony." In November of that year, Everard terminated (prorogued) the session of the Assembly of the Province, but refused to explain his reasons. The assembly then declared their prorogation was illegal and an infringement upon liberty, notifying the Lords Proprietors. They deplored the loss of ex-governor Burrington and expressed concern at the prospect "of so vile an administration". Everard then involved himself in disputes over the character of Rev. Thomas Bailey, who had defended Burrington.

Burrington, who had remained in the colony, nearly came to blows with Everard on 15 November 1725, asking Everard's servants, "Are all you country men such fools as Sir Richard Everard? He is a noodle, an ape...not more fit to be a governor than a hog in the woods."

Burrington again sought out Everard at his home on 2 December 1725, but was refused admittance. "Come out," demanded Burrington, "I want satisfaction of you for saying you would send me to England in irons. Therefore come out and give it me, you Everard, you a Knight, you a Baronet, you a Governor. You are a Sancho Panza, and I'll take care of you, numbskull head." (This episode led to procedures at law in which several depositions were taken.) The Assembly, meeting again in April, 1726, issued a catalogue of grievances, and was promptly prorogued once more by Everard.

Everard also had belligerent episodes with Edmund Porter, Dr. George Allen, and John Lovick. Everard's enemies in England maintained that he was "too much given to intoxication", though the Provincial Council, asked to voice its opinion on the matter, stated that Everard had never been publicly drunk.

Everard's sole accomplishment in office was the settlement of North Carolina's border with Virginia, which had long been disputed.

Everard's rule was even more unpopular than Burrington's had been, and his "pack of rude children who gave offence daily" were a particular sore spot. The Provincial Council complained that Everard had set up a sort of Inquisition in which the servants of the gentry were questioned under oath about whether their masters had made private disrespectful remarks about the Governor.

The Lords Proprietors sold the province to the Crown in 1729, and the Crown appointed Burrington as governor. Everard stayed in office for two more years, until Burrington had qualified. He then retired to London in 1731. Everard died two years later and was buried at Much Waltham, Essex.

== Personal life ==
Sir Richard and Susannah Everard had four children:

- Sir Richard Everard (d. 7 March 1742), succeeded his father to the baronetcy, but died unmarried.
- Sir Hugh Everard (d. 1745), succeeded his elder brother, but also died without issue, at which point the baronetcy became extinct.
- Anne Everard, married George Lathbury, about whom nothing more is known.
- Susannah Everard, married David Meade of Nansemond County, Virginia. One of her children was Richard Kidder Meade, aide-de-camp to George Washington. Another was Everard Meade, who served as aide-de-camp to General Benjamin Lincoln, as well as in both house of the Virginia General Assembly.

Government offices
Preceded by George Burrington	Governor of North Carolina; 1725–1731	Succeeded by George Burrington
Baronetage of England
Preceded by Hugh Everard	Baronet (of Much Waltham); 1706–1733	Succeeded by Richard Everard
