= White Post Historic District =

Historic district in Virginia, United States

- U.S. National Register of Historic Places
- U.S. Historic district
- Virginia Landmarks Register
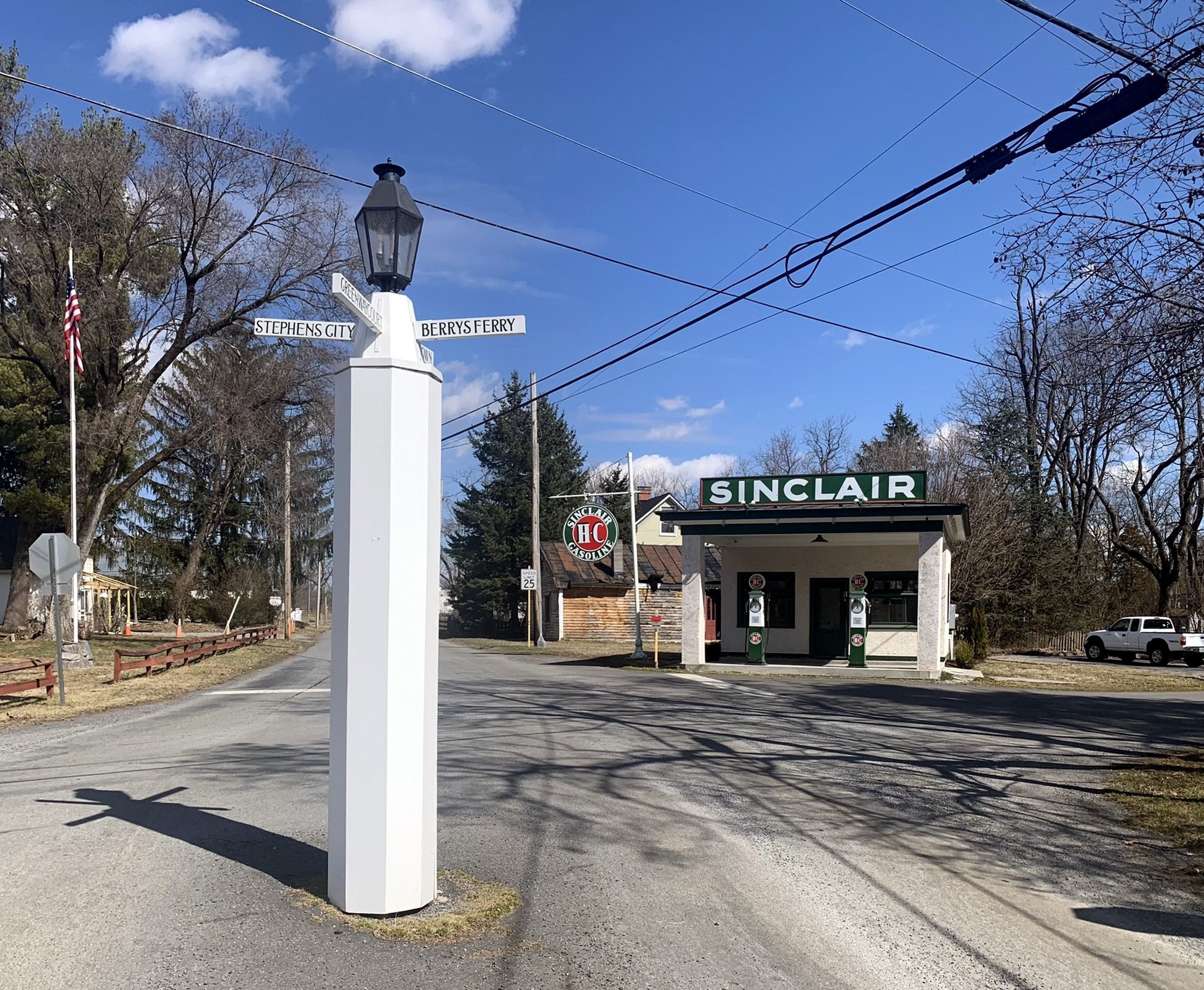
- White Post Historic District, March 2022

- Location within Northern Virginia Location within Virginia Location within the United States
- Location: VA 658 and 628, White Post, Virginia
- Coordinates: 39°3′25″N 78°6′17″W
- Area: 25 acres (10 ha)
- Built: 1875
- Architectural style: Gothic Revival, Queen Anne
- NRHP reference No.: 83003278
- VLR No.: 021-0066

Significant dates
- Added to NRHP: September 29, 1983
- Designated VLR: August 16, 1983

White Post Historic District is a national historic district located at White Post, Clarke County, Virginia. It encompasses 23 contributing buildings and 1 contributing object in the crossroads village of White Post. The contributing object is the white-painted marker which Thomas, Sixth Lord Fairfax, had erected in the 1760s (supposedly erected by then-Col. George Washington) to point the way to Greenway Court, his nearby estate.

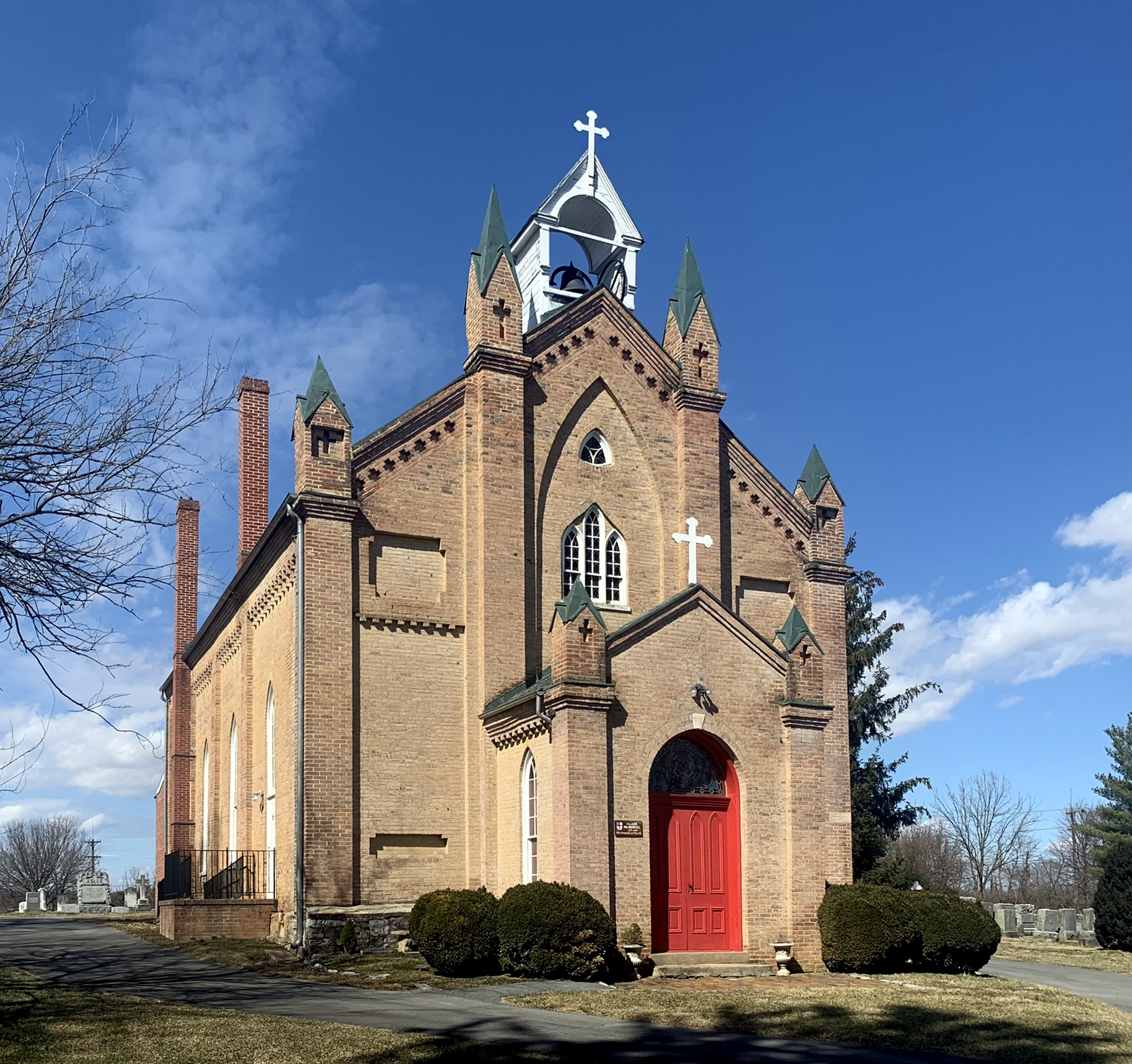
Bishop Meade Memorial Church

The most distinguished building is the Bishop Meade Memorial Church (1875), named for White Post's Bishop William Meade, who grew up at the nearby Lucky Hit plantation. Also located in the district and separately listed is Meadea, the only remaining 18th-century building. The historic district also includes 20 other residences, 3 commercial structures, as well as the Methodist church and parish hall, and an abandoned post office.

It was listed on the National Register of Historic Places in 1983.
