= William Worth (scholar) =

William Worth (1677−1742), was a classical scholar and divine.

== Education and church ==
He matriculated from Queen's College, Oxford, on 14 March 1691−2, but changed college to St. Edmund Hall, graduating BA on 17 October 1695, and MA on 4 July 1698. In 1702, on the nomination of Archbishop Tenison, he was elected a fellow of All Souls' College, Oxford, he was chaplain to the Bishop of Worcester in 1705, and on 14 December 1705 he was collated to the Archdeaconry of Worcester. He proceeded BD in 1705 and DD in 1719.

The value (5l.) of this archdeaconry in the king's books was greater than that of any preferment tenable with his fellowship. The warden of All Souls' College thereupon declared, on 7 January 1706−7, that the fellowship was vacant. Worth appealed to Tenison against the warden's action, but on 12 June 1707 renounced the appeal. Bishop William Fleetwood was led to publish his Chronicon Preciosum on the occasion of this dispute.

Worth retained this archdeaconry until his death in 1742, and combined with it from 17 February 1715−16 the third canonry at Worcester. From 16 July 1707 to 1713 he held the rectory of Halford in Warwickshire. On 9 April 1713 he was collated to the rectory of Alvechurch, and on 11 July following to the rectory of Northfield, both in Worcestershire, and he enjoyed both these benefices, with his canonry and archdeaconry, until his death.

== Writing and Editor ==
Worth edited at Oxford in 1700 ‘Tatiani Oratio ad Græcos: Hermiæ irrisio gentilium philosophorum,’ with his own annotations and those of many previous scholars. Hearne says that "most of the notes, with the dedication and preface, were written by Dr. John Mill" (Collections, Oxford Hist. Soc. i. 40). Worth's notes to the tract of Hermias were included in the edition by J. C. Dommerich, which was printed at Halle in 1764. He greatly assisted Browne Willis in his account of Worcester Cathedral (Survey of Cathedrals, vol. i. p. vi), and extracts from his collections on Worcestershire are embodied in Nash's history of that county. Edward Dechair in his edition of the ‘Legatio pro Christianis’ (1706) of Athenagoras was much indebted to Worth for various readings in manuscripts (preface to edition). A letter from Worth to Potter, afterwards archbishop of Canterbury, on the death of Dr. John Mill is in Lambeth MS. 933, art. 42, and a copy is in the British Library Add MS 4292, fol. 44. It is printed in the Gentleman's Magazine (1801, ii. 587) and in H. J. Todd's Brian Walton (i. 79−81).

== Personal ==
Worth was born at Penryn, Cornwall, and baptised at St Gluvias, its parish church, on 20 February 1676−7, was the second son of William Worth, merchant of Penryn, who died there on 22 January 1689−90, aged 55, by his wife Jane, daughter and coheiress of Mr Pennalerick. He died on 7 August 1742, and was buried in Worcester Cathedral on 11 August. His wife was a Miss Price, and their only daughter, with a fortune of 60,000l., married on 3 March 1740, William Winsmore, mayor of Worcester in 1739−40 (Gent. Mag. 1740, p. 147).

Worth's library was sold at Worcester by James Fletcher of The Turl, Oxford, together with those of William Hallifax, John Price (who served as the Chancellor of the Diocese of Worcester) and others. The sale took place from 23 September 1754, a few months after the death of Mary Davenport, his second wife.
