= William Wigan =

- Born: c. 1640
- Died: 1700 (aged 59–60); Kensington, Middlesex, England
- Resting place: St Mary Abbots, Kensington, Middlesex
- Children: George Wigan, John Wigan (physician)

William Wigan (c.1640–1700) was vicar of St Mary Abbots (1672-1700) and chaplain in ordinary to William and Mary.

== Life ==
William Wigan was probably son of an ale seller at the Harrow in Gray's Inn Lane. He was educated at Westminster School and Christ Church, Oxford, matriculating 21 July 1658. He was awarded his BA on 22 March 1662 and MA in 1664.

William Wigan and Mary Sonds (of Orsett, Essex) were married on 16 February 1687 at Lambeth church. Their children included Mary (buried 26 July 1763), Elizabeth, George (all born before 10 September 1695) and John. William Wigan was ill for five months before his death on 22 April 1700, being buried at St Mary Abbots. Kensington on 25 April 1700.

== Career ==
Wigan's earliest parish appointment was a rector of St Mary and St Peter's, Wennington (then in Essex) on 13 November 1671, resigning on 1 March 1675. He also served as domestic chaplain to Robert Rich, 5th Earl of Warwick, 2nd Earl of Holland (1620–1675). His major appointment was as vicar of St Mary Abbots (31 August 1672 to death) bestowed by the Earl of Warwick.

William Wigan was chaplain to Humphrey Henchman, Bishop of London who appointed him non-resident rector of Orsett, Essex (1 March 1675 to death). He held two prebends of St Paul's Cathedral: Prebend of St Laurence/Prebend of St Pancras (12 March 1672 – 22 December 1674) and Prebend of Cantlers, alias Kentish Town (22 December 1674 until death).

William Wigan was chaplain in ordinary to William and Mary. A sermon preached before the King and Queen on 8 January 1693 was published as was a funeral sermon preached for Elizabeth, Lady Cutts second wife of John Cutts, 1st Baron Cutts.
