= George Hooper (bishop) =

English bishop

The Right Reverend George Hooper
- Bishop of Bath and Wells
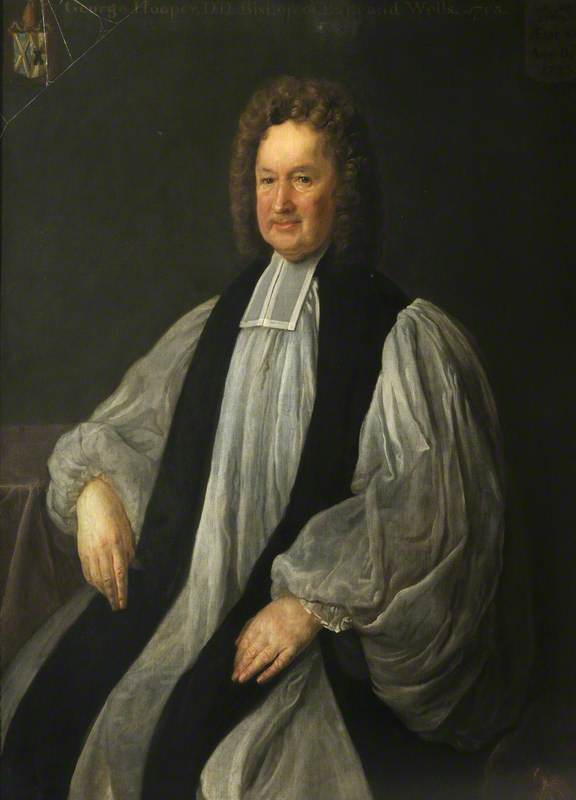
- Hooper by Thomas Hill
- See: St Asaph; Bath and Wells
- Installed: 1704
- Predecessor: Richard Kidder
- Successor: John Wynne
- Other post: Bishop of St Asaph 1703–1704

Orders
- Ordination: 18 January 1668 by Walter Blandford
- Consecration: 31 October 1703 by Thomas Tenison

Personal details
- Born: 18 November 1640 Grimley, Worcestershire, England
- Died: 6 September 1727 (aged 86) Barkley, Frome, Somerset, England
- Buried: Wells Cathedral
- Denomination: Church of England
- Parents: George Hooper, Joan Giles
- Spouse: Abigail Guildford
- Education: Christ Church, Oxford, BA 1660, MA 1663, BD 1673, and DD 1677

George Hooper

Ecclesiastical career
- Congregations: rector of Havant and of East Woodhay, Hampshire, 1672 rector of St Mary, Lambeth, 1675 precentor of Exeter, 1677 dean of Canterbury, 1691
- Offices held: chaplain to Dr Morley, bishop of Winchester, 1673, chaplain to Dr Sheldon, archbishop of Canterbury, 1675 chaplain to Prince of Orange and Princess Mary, 1677 chaplain to Charles II, 1680

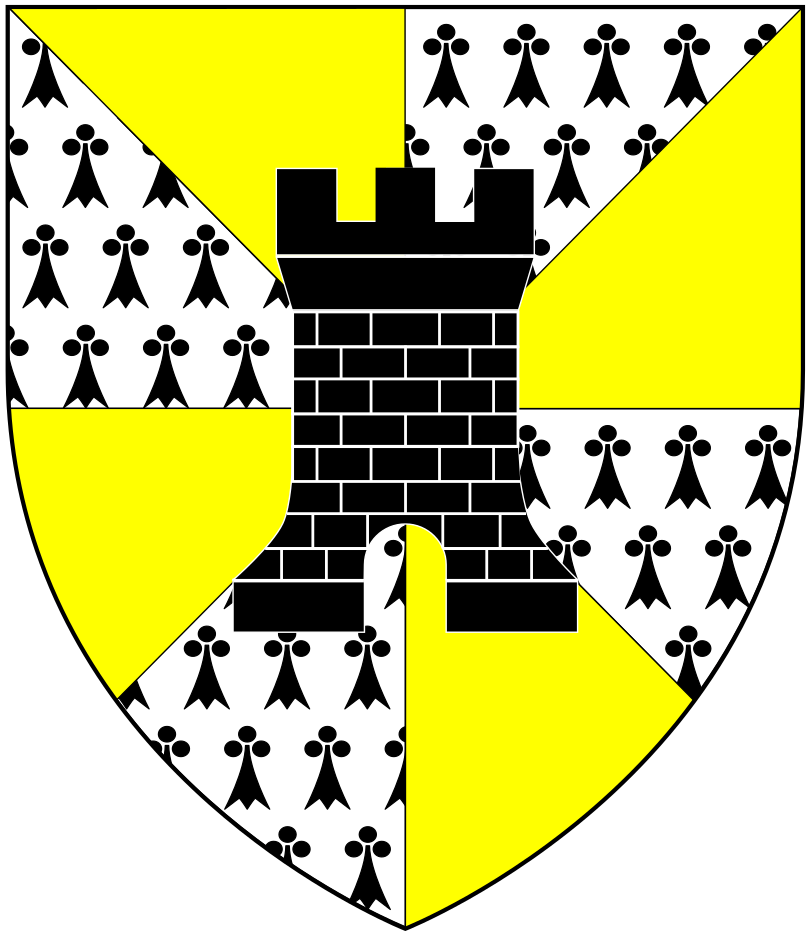
Arms of Hooper: Gyronny of eight or and ermine, over all a castle triple-towered sable

George Hooper (18 November 1640 – 6 September 1727) was a learned and influential English High church cleric of the late seventeenth and early eighteenth centuries. He served as bishop of the Welsh diocese, St Asaph, and later for the diocese of Bath and Wells, as well as chaplain to members of the royal family.

== Early life ==
George Hooper was born at Grimley in Worcestershire, 18 November 1640. His father, also George Hooper, appears to have been a gentleman of independent means; his mother, Joan Hooper, was daughter of Edmund Giles, gentleman, of White Ladies Aston, Worcestershire. From Grimley his parents moved to Westminster. He was elected a scholar of St Paul's School while John Langley was high-master (1640–1657), but then was transferred to Westminster School under Richard Busby, who thought him very promising, and obtained a king's scholarship there.

Hooper as elected to a Westminster studentship at Christ Church, Oxford, in 1657: he graduated BA 16 January 1660, MA 1 December 1663, BD 9 July 1673, and DD 3 July 1677. He remained at Oxford as college tutor until 1672, and made the acquaintance of Thomas Ken. Under Dr. Edward Pococke he became a good Hebrew and Syriac scholar, but also learned enough Arabic to apply it to Old Testament exegesis.

== Clergyman ==
In 1673 Bishop Morley persuaded Hooper to come and reside with him as his chaplain at Winchester. Ken was the bishop's chaplain at the same time. In the same year Morley presented Hooper to the living of Havant, where he seems to have gone into residence at once, and contracted an ague from the dampness of the place. Ken, then incumbent at East Woodhay in Hampshire, then resigned the living to make way for his friend. Hooper was instituted at Woodhay in 1672. Isaac Milles, the exemplary parish priest of the neighbouring village of High Clere, frequently mentioned Hooper as "the one of all clergymen whom he had ever known in whom the three characters of perfect gentleman, thorough scholar, and venerable divine met in the most complete accordance."

Archbishop Sheldon induced Morley to permit Hooper to move to Lambeth Palace to become his own chaplain in 1673. In 1675 he was collated by Sheldon to the rectory of Lambeth, and soon afterwards to the precentorship of Exeter. Morley sent for Hooper to attend him in his last sickness in 1684.

== Royal chaplain ==
On the marriage of the Princess Mary with the Prince of Orange, Hooper went with her to Holland in 1677 as her almoner at the Hague. Here he had a difficult post to fill, since the Prince's views inclined to the Dutch Presbyterians, and the Princess's former chaplain, Dr. William Lloyd, had allowed her to give up the Anglican services. Hooper persuaded her to read in Hooker and Eusebius, and argued with the Prince, to the point of William saying "Well, Dr. Hooper, you will never be a bishop." His daughter, Mrs. Prowse, however, reported that "in this station he was directed to regulate the Performance of Divine Chappel in Her Highness's Chappel, according to the usage of the Church of England, which he did in so prudent and decent a manner as to give no offence."

After about a year at The Hague, Hooper returned home to marry, then afterwards he returned to the Hague for eight months, when he was succeeded by Ken. In 1680 he was made chaplain to Charles II, and in the same year the Regius Professor of Divinity at Oxford, vacant by the death of Richard Allestree, was offered to him: he declined it. In 1685 he was asked by James II to attend the Duke of Monmouth the evening before his execution, and on the following morning was on the scaffold with the Bishops of Ely and Bath and Wells and Dr. Tenison.

At the Williamite Revolution he was one of the few decidedly High churchmen who took the oaths. In 1691, on the promotion of Dean Sharp to the archbishopric of York, Queen Mary offered him the deanery of Canterbury, taking advantage of the king's absence to promote her favourite: William, on his return, expressed displeasure at her conduct. In 1698 the Princess Anne and her husband Prince George of Denmark wanted Hooper as tutor to the young Duke of Gloucester, but the king imposed Gilbert Burnet.

In 1701 Hooper was elected prolocutor to the lower house of the convocation of Canterbury, and defended its privileges of the lower house. About the same time he declined an offer of the primacy of Ireland made by the Earl of Rochester, as lord-lieutenant.

== Bishop ==
Towards the close of 1702 he accepted the bishopric of St. Asaph. In 1703 the see of Bath and Wells fell vacant through the death of Richard Kidder. Queen Anne offered Hooper, but he felt that his friend Thomas Ken, who had been deprived of the see as a non-juror in 1690, was the proper bishop of Bath and Wells. After negotiations, Hooper to filled the vacancy. Ken ceased signing himself "T. Bath and Wells", and dedicated his Hymnarium to Hooper. The queen ordered a pension of £200 a year to be paid to Ken.

Hooper was happy in the see of Bath and Wells, and refused translation, and a seat on the privy council. He was a frequent preacher before royalty. In the "church in danger" debate in the House of Lords in 1705 he maintained that the danger was not, as some supposed, imaginary; in 1706 he spoke against the union between England and Scotland, and advocated in the cause of the Scottish Episcopal church. In 1709–10 he defended Henry Sacheverell, and entered his protest against the vote in favour of his impeachment.

Burnet, who had personal differences with Hooper in Convocation, describes him in 1701 in his History of His Own Time as "reserved, crafty, and ambitious". Other detractors of Hooper were Jacobites and nonjurors who were angry with Ken for resigning his canonical claims to Bath and Wells. Francis Atterbury also calle him ambitious; William Whiston, whom Hooper had rejected from holy communion, expressed a high opinion of his character.

== Family and later life ==
Hooper married in 1678, a lady, Abigail Guildford, to whom he had been engaged before he left England for the Hague. He died, aged nearly eighty-seven, on 6 September 1727, at Barkley, near Frome, a secluded spot in his diocese to which he was wont to retire at intervals to recruit his strength. He survived his wife one year; and out of a family of nine children only one was living at the time of his death, the wife of John Prowse of Axbridge, who was author of an unpublished life of her father. Hooper was buried in Wells Cathedral, and a marble monument was erected to his memory created by Samuel Tuffnell (d.1763).

== Works ==
Hooper's writing, with the exception of his sermons, were published anonymously.

- The Church of England free from the imputation of Popery. c. 1682.

This was a discourse written and published at the request of Henry Compton, bishop of London, about 1682. Another edition was printed in The London Cases in 1694. It was also reprinted by the author at his own expense in 1716, and given to his clergy at his triennial visitation the year following.

- A Fair and Methodical Discussion of the First and great Controversy between the Church of England and the Church of Rome concerning the Infallible Guide, 1689.
- A Discourse concerning Lent, in 2 Parts, 1695.

This is a long, learned inquiry into the meaning and origin of the Lenten fast.

- A Calculation of the Credibility of Human Testimony, first printed in the Philosophical Transactions, October 1699

This is the only printed work of Hooper that is mathematical.

- The Narrative Vindicated,

i.e. the Narrative of the Proceedings of the Lower House of Convocation, 1700-1, by Henry Aldrich: This was answered by White Kennett.

- De Valentiniarnorum Hæresi, quibus illius origo ex Ægyptiacâ Theologiâ deducitur, 1711. (In Latin.)

This was dedicated to John Ernest Grabe. There was added, in the edition of 1757, Emendationes et Observationes ad Tertulliani adverseus Valentinianos Tractatum. Both were intended to accompany a new edition of Tertullian, Adversus Valentinianos which Hooper was preparing for press. Hearing that a new edition of Tertullian's works was being prepared abroad, he sent his notes to the editors, but they were lost.

- Eight Sermons preached on several occasions from 1681 to 1713.
- An Inquiry into the State of Antient Weights and Measure, the Attick, the Roman and the Jewish, 1721.
- De Benedictione Patriarchæ Jacobi, Gen. xlix. Conjecturæ, 1728.

This was published by Hooper's own directions on his deathbed, at Oxford, by Thomas Hunt, who prepared in 1757 an edition in 2 vols. of most of Hooper's works. Another edition was published at Oxford (1855).

Anglican Communion titles
Preceded by John Sharp	Dean of Canterbury; 1691–1703	Succeeded by George Stanhope
Preceded by Edward Jones	Bishop of St Asaph; 1703–1704	Succeeded by William Beveridge
Preceded by Richard Kidder	Bishop of Bath and Wells; 1704–1727	Succeeded by John Wynne
