= Meadea =

Historic house in Virginia, United States

- U.S. National Register of Historic Places
- U.S. Historic district – Contributing property
- Virginia Landmarks Register
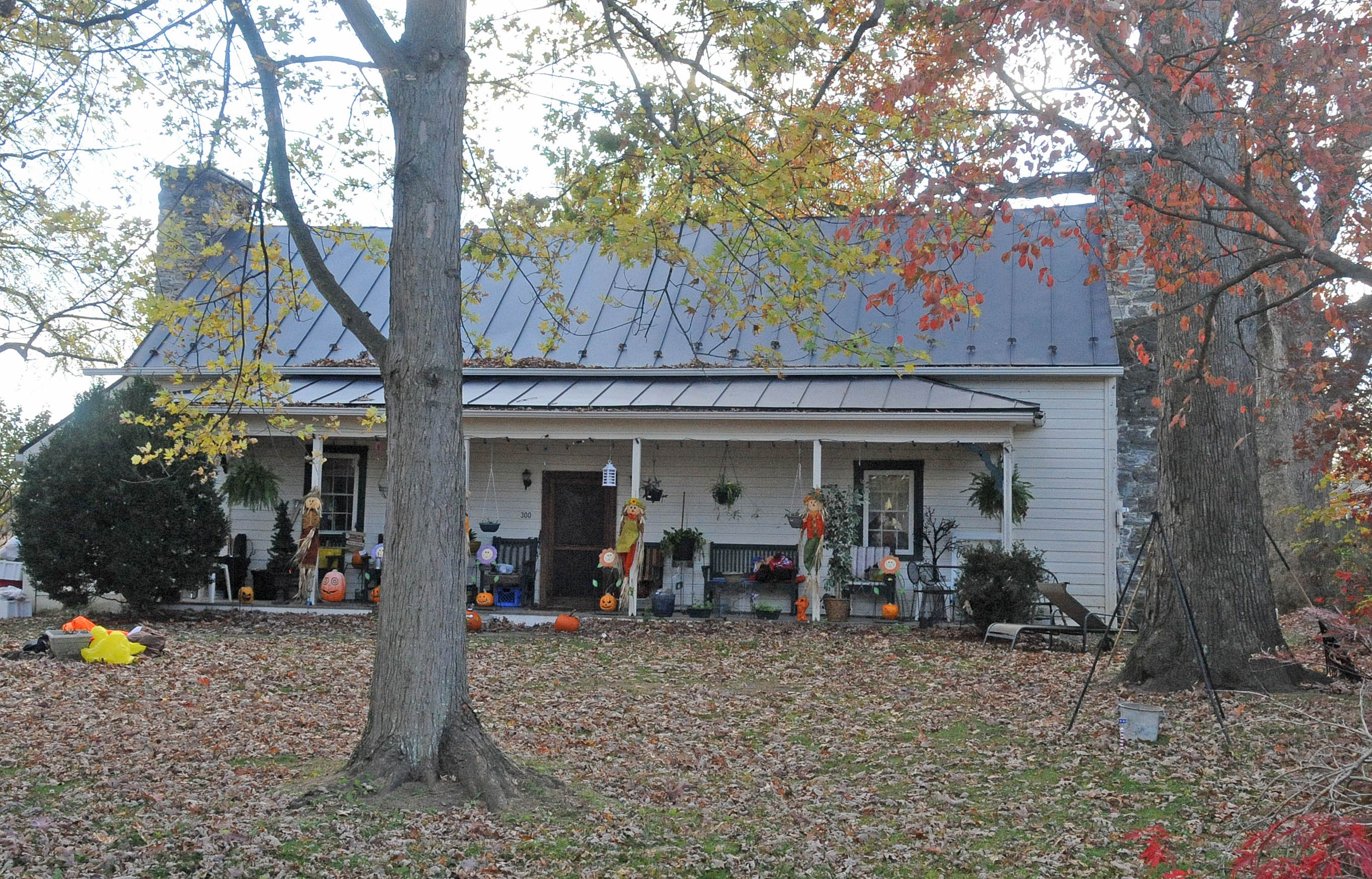

- Location within Northern Virginia Location within Virginia Location within the United States
- Location: 600 ft. E of jct. VA 658 and VA 628, S side, White Post, Virginia
- Coordinates: 39°3′26″N 78°6′8″W
- Area: 1 acre (0.40 ha)
- Built: c. 1784
- Architectural style: Colonial
- NRHP reference No.: 95000022
- VLR No.: 021-0018

Significant dates
- Added to NRHP: February 8, 1995
- Designated VLR: June 16, 1993

Meadea is a historic home located at White Post, Clarke County, Virginia. It was built prior to 1760 consisting of just two rooms and loft. It had a central stone chimney with two hearths, one of which was dedicated to cooking.

An aide to George Washington, Col. Richard Kidder Meade (1746–1805), of the American Revolutionary War, after the war bought a large tract of land in the valley of Virginia on the advice of George Washington.

Meadea, a small frontier cabin at the time, was included in the tract of land . The house was enlarged by adding to the west end of the cabin about 1784, to allow it to be a temporary home for Col. Meade and his family until a larger home (Lucky Hit) could be built. Bishop William Meade was born at Meadea and raised at Lucky Hit.

Since 1784 the Meadea has undergone significant reconstruction and renovation and it is now a 1 1/2-story, three-bay, log dwelling with a gable roof. The side of the house enclosing the cooking hearth was removed leaving it exposed. The hearth remains standing and is visible at the east end of the home. The house rests on a stone foundation and has two attached stone chimneys, one at either end. Descendants of Col. Meade continue to live at Meadea.

Meadea is the only remaining 18th-century log building in White Post. Meadea was listed on the National Register of Historic Places in 1995 located in the White Post Historic District.
