= Farnley (White Post, Virginia) =

Historic house in Virginia, United States

- U.S. National Register of Historic Places
- Virginia Landmarks Register
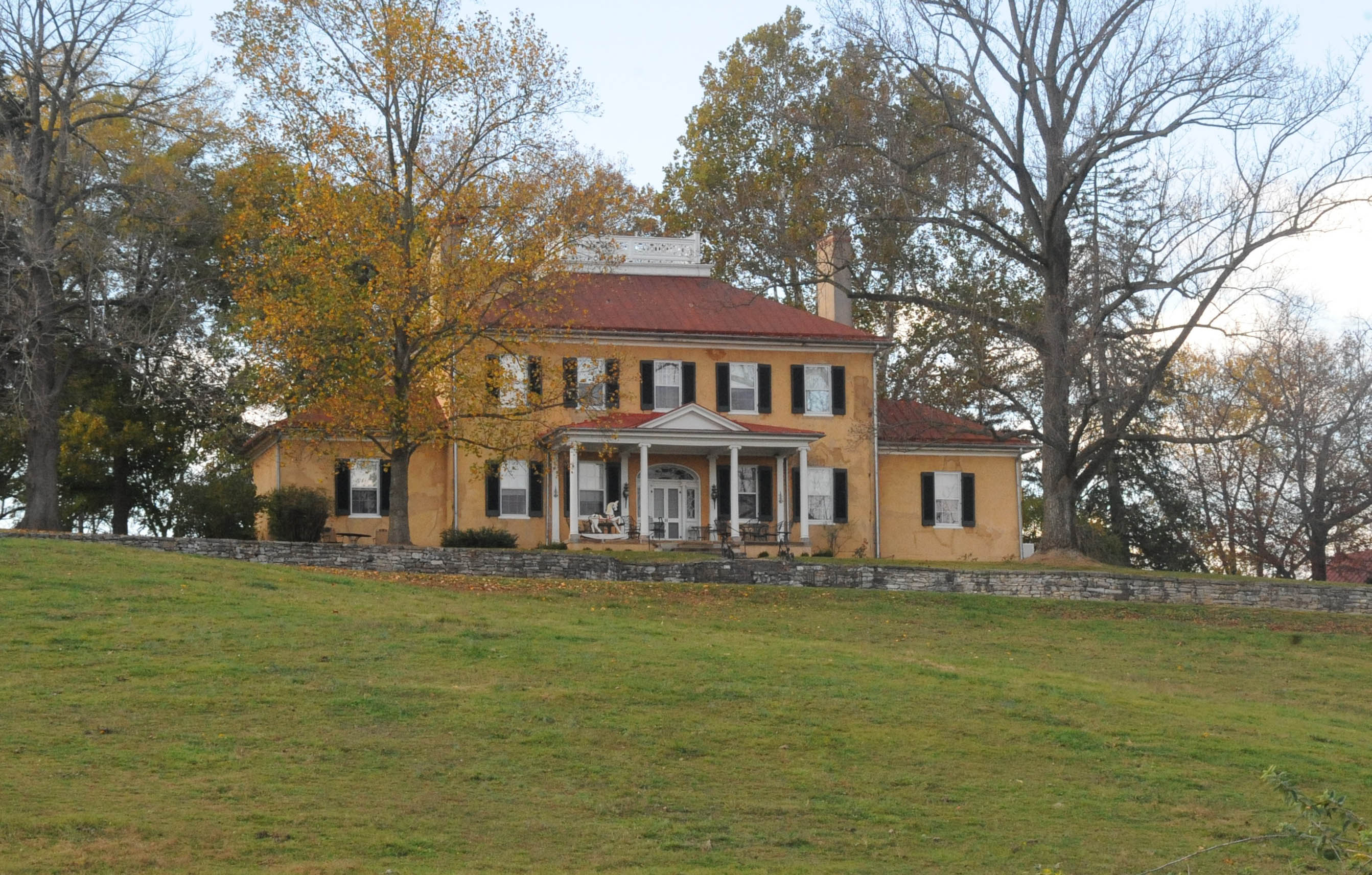

- Location within Northern Virginia Location within Virginia Location within the United States
- Location: VA 658 at VA 622, near White Post, Virginia
- Coordinates: 39°01′41″N 78°06′50″W
- Area: 400 acres (160 ha)
- Built: c. 1815-1820, 1836
- Architectural style: Federal
- NRHP reference No.: 89001914
- VLR No.: 021-0030

Significant dates
- Added to NRHP: November 2, 1989
- Designated VLR: December 13, 1988

Farnley is a property that includes two historic plantation houses and a farm located near White Post, Clarke County, Virginia. The Meadows is a brick I-house built sometime between 1815 and 1820. The focal point of the property, however, is its namesake Farnley, a sophisticated Federal-style residence built about 1836. It has a gable roof with wide interior-end chimneys. Also on the property is an assortment of 19th- and 20th-century farm buildings including a stone slave quarters.

It was listed on the National Register of Historic Places in 1989.
