= Susannah Kidder Everard, Lady Everard =

Colonial First Lady of North Carolina

Lady Everard
- Born: Susannah Kidder; 1683; Essex, England
- Died: 1739 (aged 55–56); Essex, England
- Spouse: Sir Richard Everard, 4th Baronet
- Children: 4
- Parents: Richard Kidder (father); Elizabeth Kidder née Howell (mother)
- Relatives: Richard Kidder Meade (grandson)

Susannah Kidder Everard, Lady Everard (1683–1739) was a British aristocrat, heiress, and society hostess. She was married to Sir Richard Everard, 4th Baronet, who served as the Governor of the Province of North Carolina from 1725 to 1731.

== Biography ==
Lady Everard was born Susannah Kidder in 1683 in Essex to The Rt. Rev. Richard Kidder, who served as the Bishop of Bath and Wells, and Lady Elizabeth Jane Kidder née Howell. Her father died during the Great storm of 1703 after being struck by a falling chimney at the Bishop's Palace.

On 13 June 1706 she married the aristocrat Sir Richard Everard, 4th Baronet, who served as the governor of the Province of North Carolina from 1725 to 1731. They had four children:

- Sir Richard Everard (d. 7 March 1742), succeeded his father to the Everard baronetcy, but died unmarried.
- Sir Hugh Everard (d. 1745), succeeded his elder brother to the baronetcy, but also died without issue at which point the baronetcy became extinct.
- Anne Everard, married George Lathbury
- Susannah Everard, married David Meade of Nansemond County, Virginia. One of her children was Richard Kidder Meade, aide-de-camp to George Washington.

During her husband's term as governor, the family resided in Edenton, North Carolina. They were unpopular with the local gentry. Her husband was removed from the Carolinian governorship in 1731, following the sale of the province from the Lords Proprietor back to the British Crown, and they moved to Nansemond County, Virginia before returning to London.

She died in 1739 in Much Waltham, Essex.
