= Craig's Court =

Courtyard in central London

Coordinates: 51°30′24″N 0°07′36″W

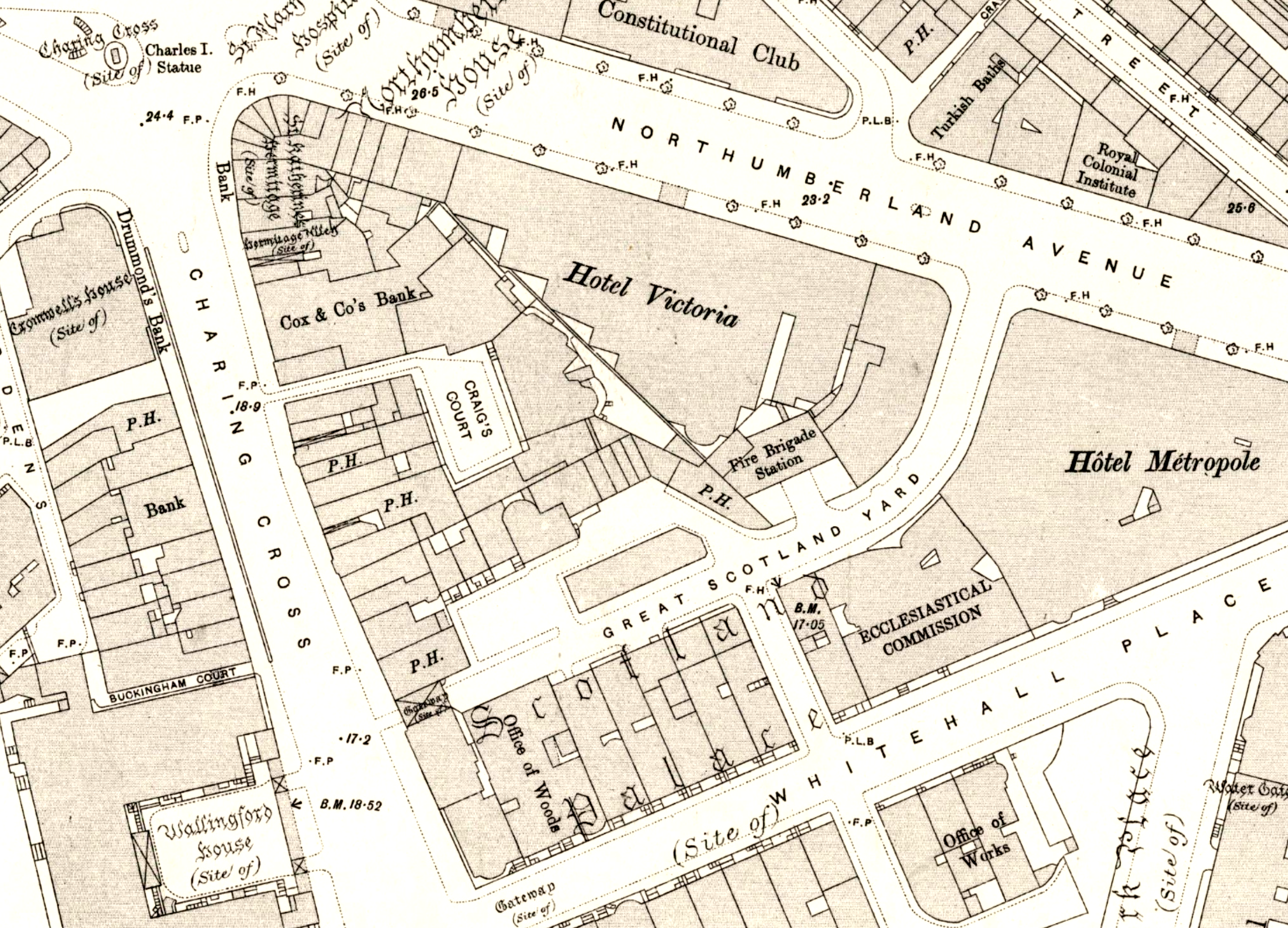
Craig's Court (centre) on an 1895 Ordnance Survey map

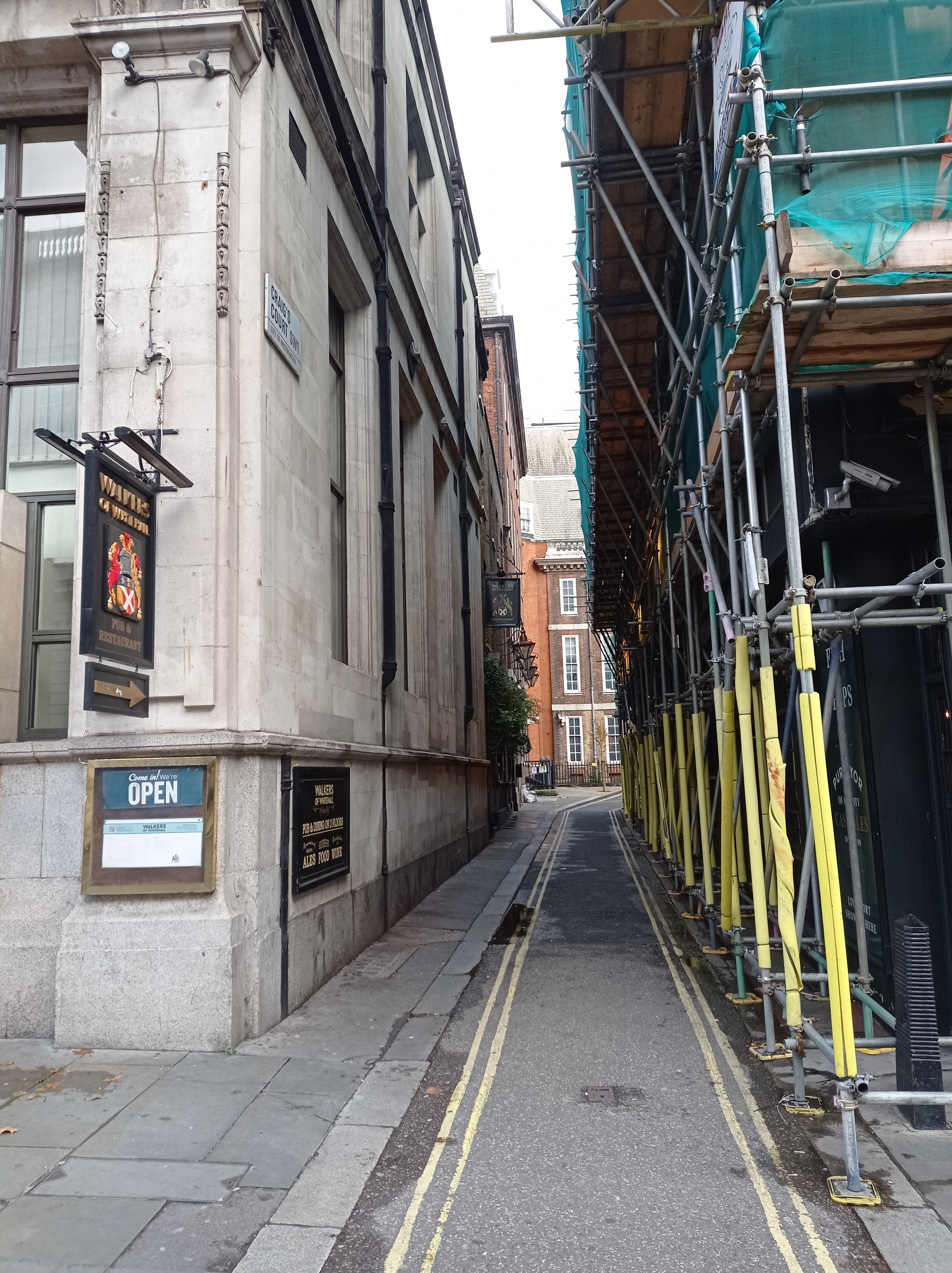
The narrow entrance to Craig's Court

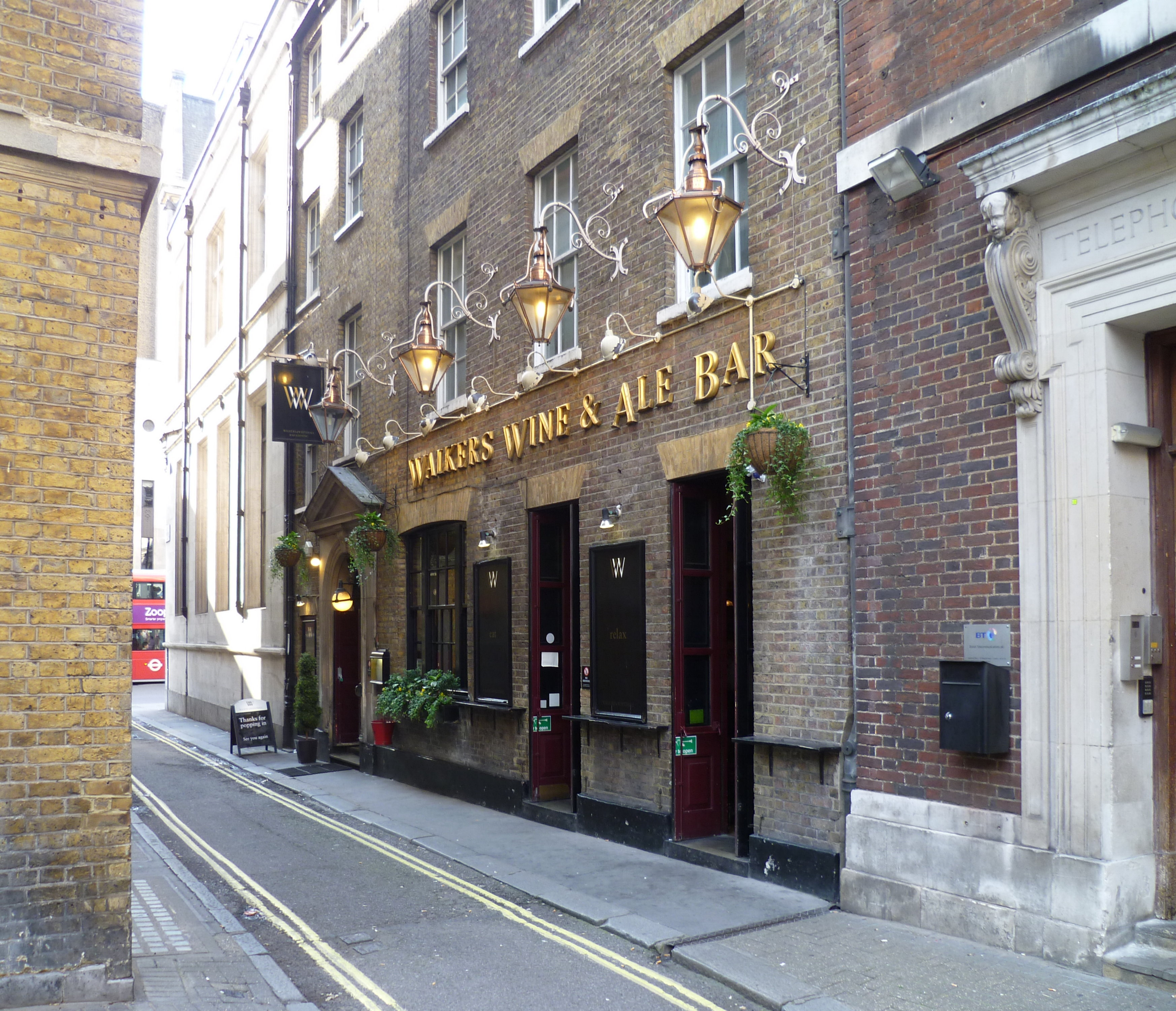
Walkers of Whitehall when it was Walkers Wine and Ale Bar

Craig's Court is a courtyard off Whitehall in central London containing the grade II* listed Harrington House (c.1692), other listed buildings, and the British Telecom Whitehall telephone exchange of which Harrington House forms a part. It was built by Joseph Craig in the late 1690s on land that had once been the location of the Hermitage of St Katherine.

The Court is entered through a narrow single-track road in which the carriage of the Speaker of the House of Commons once got stuck and which is often overlooked by tourists. The Sun Fire Office had offices there from 1726 and army agents Cox & Company were located there for over 150 years. Former residents include the memoirist Teresia Constantia Phillips (1748–49) and the painter George Romney in the 1760s, but the only remaining original building is Harrington House.

== Origins ==
Craig's Court was built towards the end of the seventeenth century by Joseph Craig (died 1711), a vestryman of the London parish of St Martin-in-the-Fields on land that he already owned and other land that was sold to Joseph "Cragg" by William Waad in 1695. The area had earlier been the site of the Hermitage of St Katherine. References to houses in the Court appear in official records from the 1690s. It was originally named Craggs's Court and is labelled Crag's Court on John Rocque's map of 1747. It is labelled Craig's Court on Richard Horwood's map of 1799 which is its current name.

== Buildings ==
The entrance to the Court is a single-track road which is said to have hastened the creation of the Westminster Paving Act when Speaker of the House of Commons, Arthur Onslow's carriage was involved in an accident on entering the Court. On the north side of the entrance is part of the South African High Commission, Walkers of Whitehall public house, and a telephone exchange that replaced numbers 1 and 2. On the south side of the entrance is the grade II listed 25 Whitehall (Craig's Court House), which runs from Whitehall and into the western side of the Court.

The rear of The Old Shades public house, which fronts Whitehall, is in the Court. It is also grade II listed.

== Harrington House ==
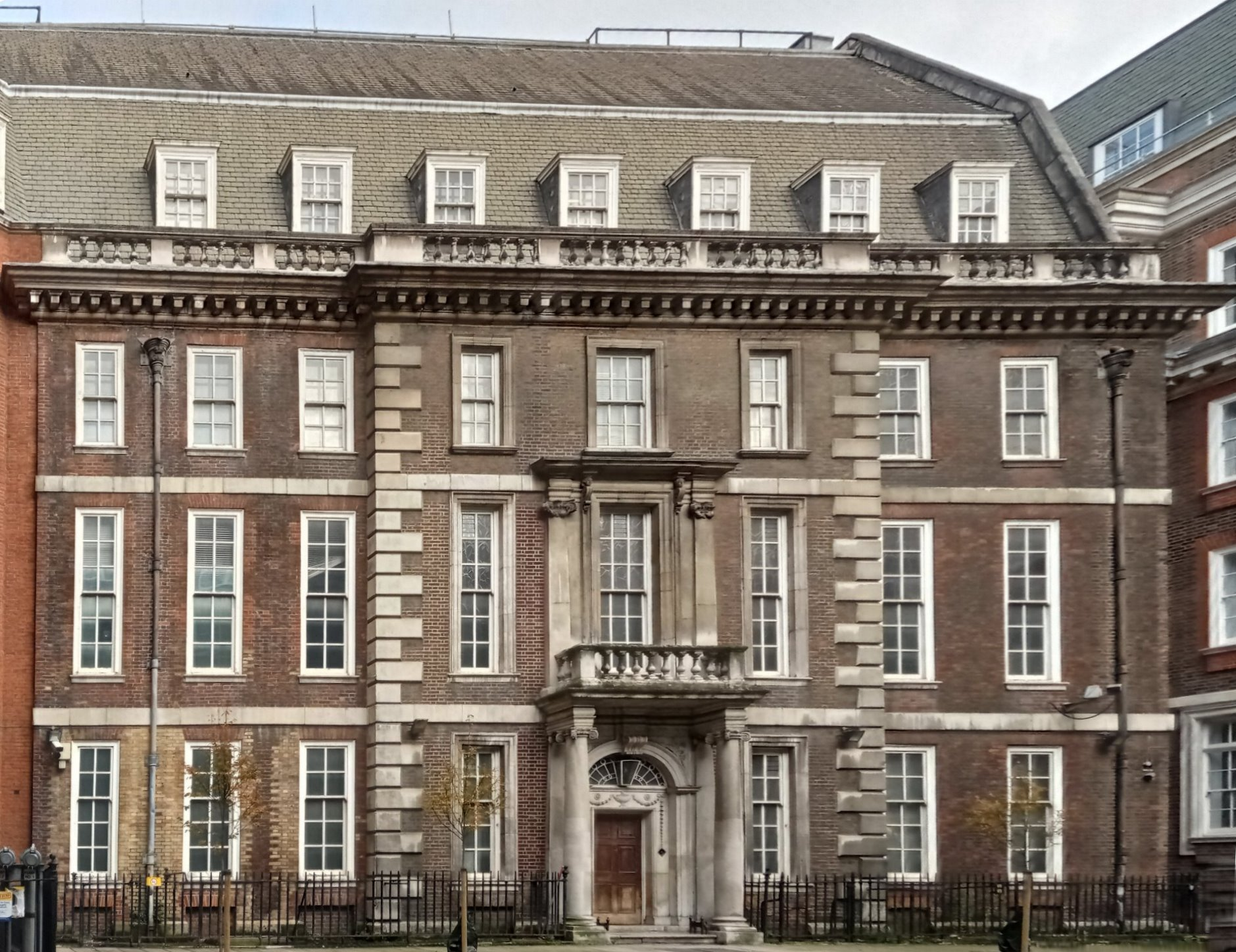
Harrington House

The only remaining building from the original Craig's Court is Harrington House at numbers 3 and 4, built on the east side around 1692, and probably initially occupied by Joseph Craig. It remained in the descent of the Craig family until 1809 and had a succession of mostly aristocratic tenants who occupied the house because it was convenient for Whitehall and their positions in the British government. It became known as Harrington House when Charles Wyndham Stanhope, the 7th Earl of Harrington, moved there in 1867 or 1868 after the building was vacated by the Sun Fire Office, but it is not to be confused with the former residence of the Earls at Harrington House in Stable Yard, St James's. The 7th earl died in the house in 1881.

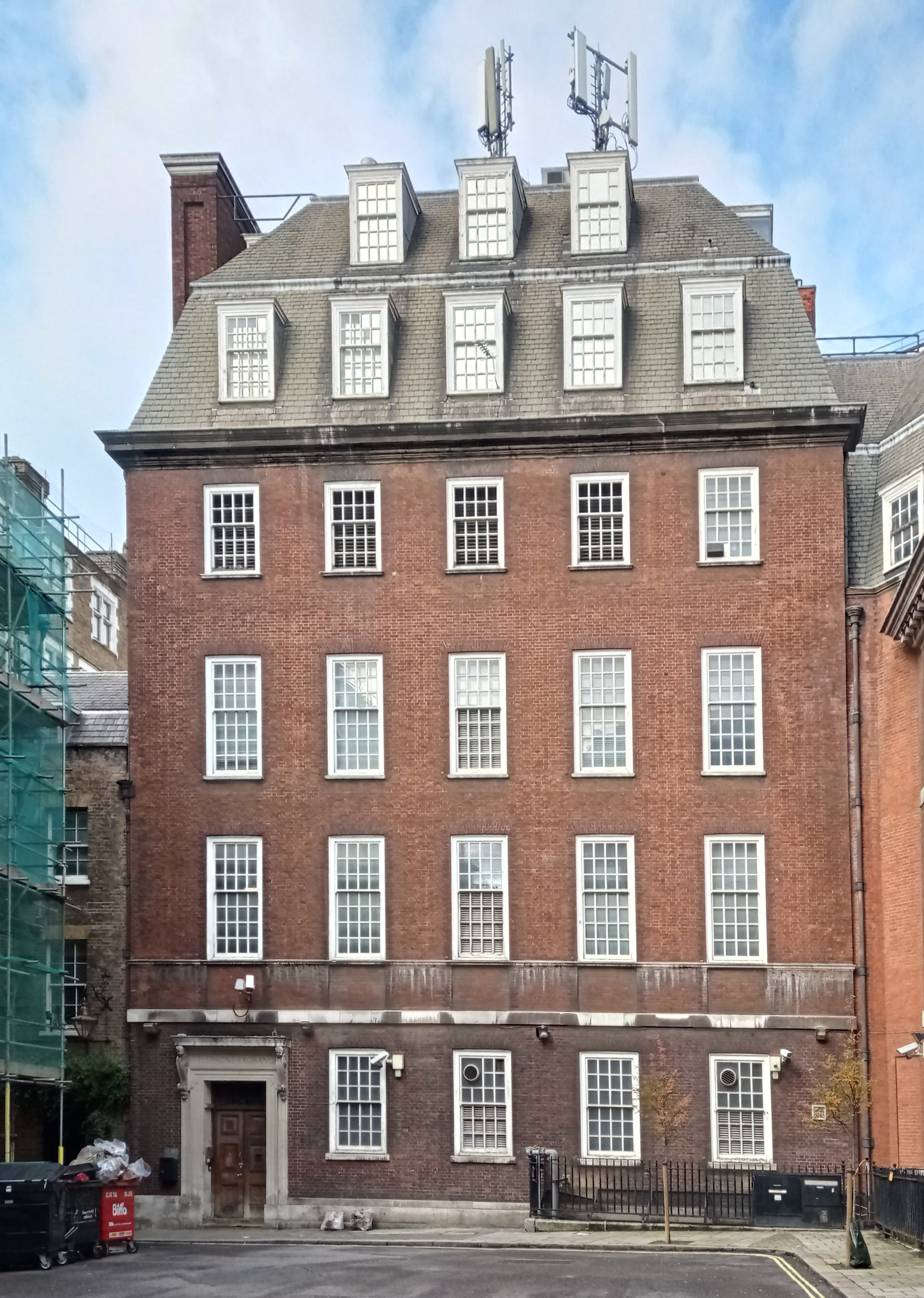
The telephone exchange on the north side that replaced 1 and 2 Craig's Court

In 1917, the building was acquired by the army agents and bankers Cox & Company, and in 1925 was purchased by the Postmaster General who also purchased land adjacent to the north with which it was joined around the same time. It was heightened in the 1950s. The combined buildings are now part of the British Telecom exchange known as Q-Whitehall which contains one of the entrances to the secret government tunnels under central London which date principally to the Second World War and Cold War eras. Harrington House is grade II* listed with Historic England.

== Businesses ==
The Sun Fire Office (established 1710) is first recorded in the Court in 1726, initially at number 9 before moving to Harrington House, as it would later be known, in 1759. The firm moved to Charing Cross in 1867.

The army agents and bankers Cox & Company, founded by Richard Cox in 1758, moved to Craig's Court around 1765 as the firm grew rapidly. It continued to expand in the nineteenth century as it took on the agency of more regiments, causing it to need more office space in the Court. The outbreak of the First World War in 1914 caused a further increase in business and the firm acquired more office space in the Court and adjacent streets, its clerks working day and night shifts, and numbering 4,500 by 1918, but the end of the war brought a rapid decline and the sale of the business in 1923 to Lloyds Bank.

== Former residents ==
- Physician John Wigan lived at number 8 in 1730–31.
- Memoirist Teresia Constantia Phillips lived there in 1748 and 1749.
- The painter George Romney had his first London home there from 1763 to 1767.
- Architects John Henry Hakewill and his brother Edward Charles Hakewill were at number 8 in the 1840s.
