= Lucky Hit =

Historic house in Virginia, United States

- U.S. National Register of Historic Places
- Virginia Landmarks Register
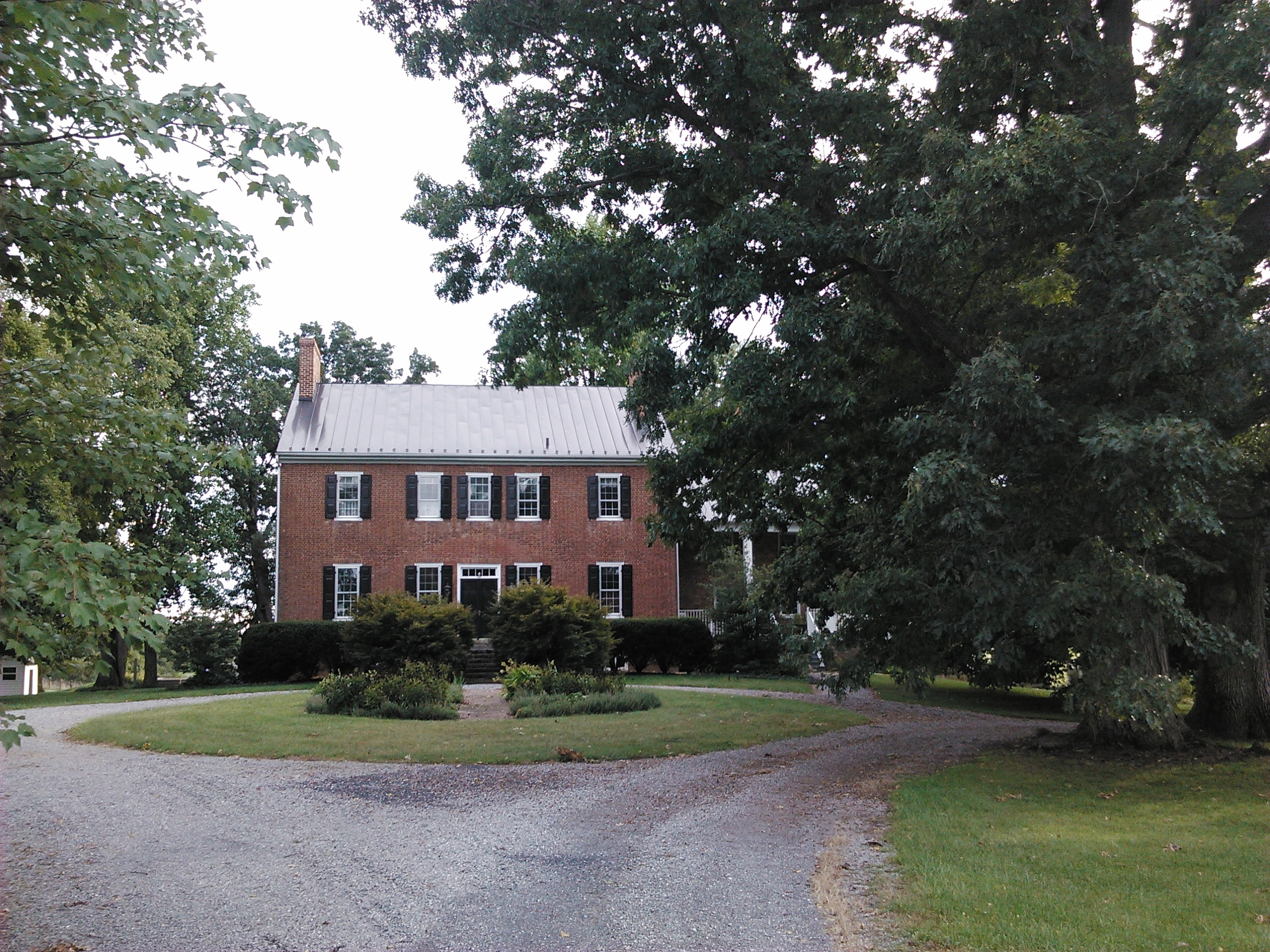
- Historic home of R.K. Meade

- Location within Northern Virginia Location within Virginia Location within the United States
- Location: VA 628 S side, 4500 ft. NE of jct. with VA 658, White Post, Virginia
- Coordinates: 39°3′22″N 78°5′33″W
- Area: 131.5 acres (53.2 ha)
- Built: 1791
- Architectural style: Federal
- NRHP reference No.: 93000834
- VLR No.: 021-0045

Significant dates
- Added to NRHP: August 12, 1993
- Designated VLR: June 16, 1993

Lucky Hit is one of the oldest brick houses in southwestern Clarke County, Virginia. The double-pile (i.e. two rooms deep), central hallway house was built by Colonel Richard Kidder Meade around 1791, and was named by Meade in his belief that he had made a fortunate choice in his property. He previously resided at the log house Meadea. His children, including Bishop William Meade and Ann Randolph Meade Page, who were raised on this plantation established plantations nearby; many of the historic houses remain today. This property stayed in the Meade family until 1869.

It was listed on the National Register of Historic Places in 1993.
