= Thomas Hill (British painter) =

British portrait painter

- Died: Mitcham
- Occupation: Painter

Thomas Hill (1661–1734) was a British portrait painter.

== Biography ==
Hill was born in 1661, first learned drawing from William Faithorne the elder, the engraver. He painted numerous portraits at the beginning of the eighteenth century, some of which were engraved in mezzotint by John Smith and others. Among them were George Hooper, bishop of Bath and Wells, Baron de Ginkel, Sir Henry Goodricke, bart., Lady Goodricke, and a group of three children of the Duke of Leeds. He painted three portraits of Humphrey Wanley: one is in the Bodleian Library, Oxford; another, dated 18 December 1711, is in the collection of the Society of Antiquaries, ‘painted in a peculiarly soft and ornamental manner;’ and a third, painted in 1717, is in the National Portrait Gallery. Hill died at Mitcham in 1734.
