= Samuel Freeman (priest) =

Dean of Peterborough

Samuel Freeman (10 June 1664 – 14 October 1707) was dean of Peterborough from 1691 until his death.

Freeman graduated from Clare College, Cambridge in 1665. He held incumbencies at St. Peter, Stantonbury, St. Peter and St. Paul, Olney, Buckinghamshire, St Anne and St Agnes in the City of London, and St Paul, Covent Garden. He was also a prebendary of St Paul's Cathedral. He received the degree of Doctor of Divinity (DD).

Church of England titles
Preceded by Richard Kidder	Dean of Peterborough; 1691–1707	Succeeded by White Kennett
