= Humfrey Wanley =

English librarian, palaeographer and scholar

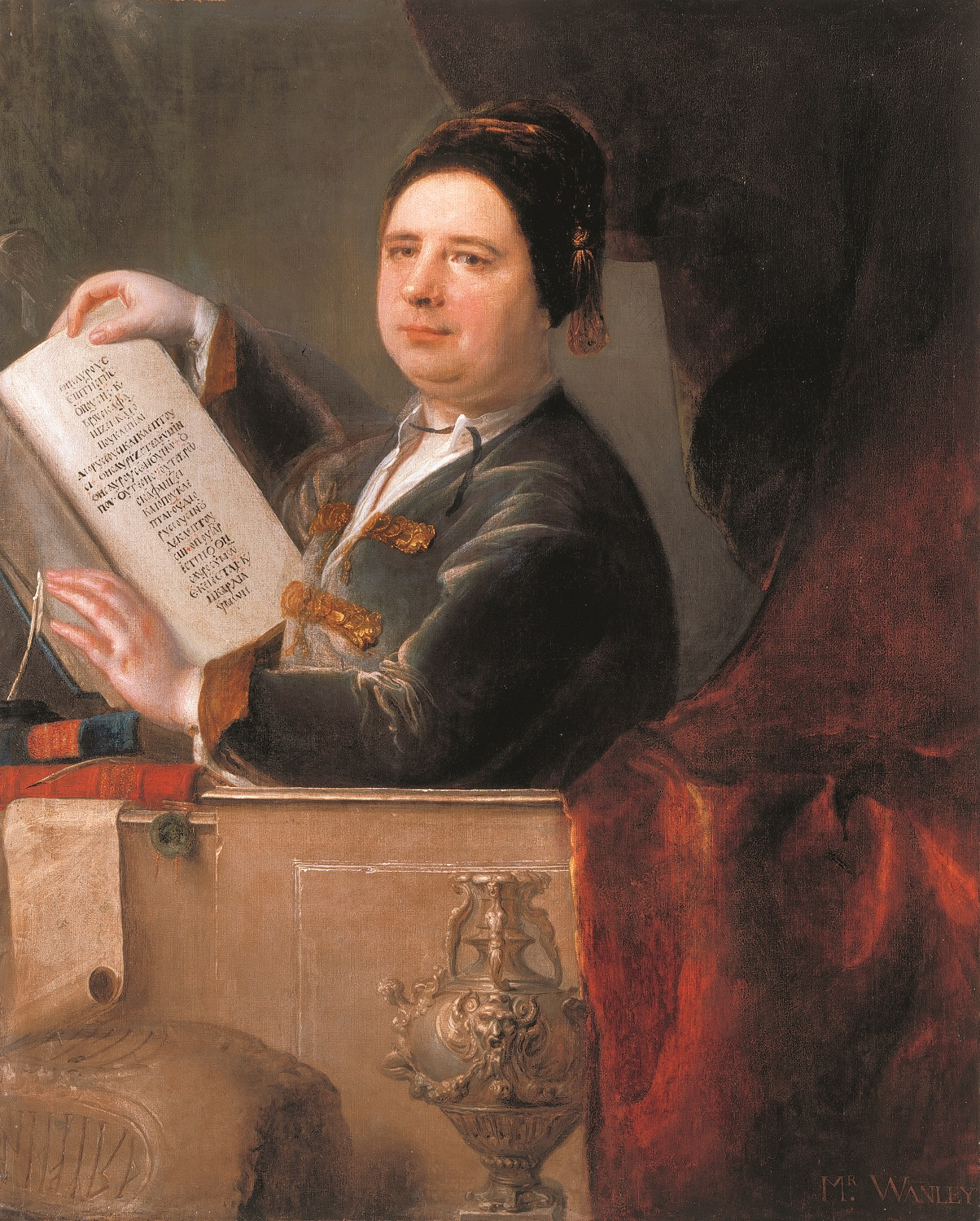
Wanley holding a facsimile copy of a cruciform Greek manuscript (Lectionary 150), painting at the Society of Antiquaries, 1711.

Humfrey Wanley (21 March 1672 – 6 July 1726) was an English librarian, palaeographer and scholar of Old English, employed by manuscript collectors such as Robert and Edward Harley. He was the first keeper of the Harleian Library, now the Harleian Collection.

== Early life and education ==
Wanley was born at Coventry on 21 March 1671/2 and baptised on 10 April, the son of Nathaniel Wanley. Around 1687, he was apprenticed to a draper called Wright at Coventry, and remained with him until 1694, but he spent every vacant hour in studying old books and documents and copying the various styles of handwriting. His studies are said to have begun with a transcript of the Anglo-Saxon dictionary of William Somner.

His skill in unravelling ancient writing became known to William Lloyd, the bishop of Lichfield, who at a visitation sent for him, and ultimately obtained his entrance, as a commoner, at St Edmund Hall, Oxford University, where the theologian John Mill, was principal. He matriculated there on 7 May 1695, but next year moved to University College, on the persuasion of the college master, Arthur Charlett, with whom he lived. He took no degree at Oxford, but gave Mill much help in collating the text of the New Testament.

== Antiquarian career ==
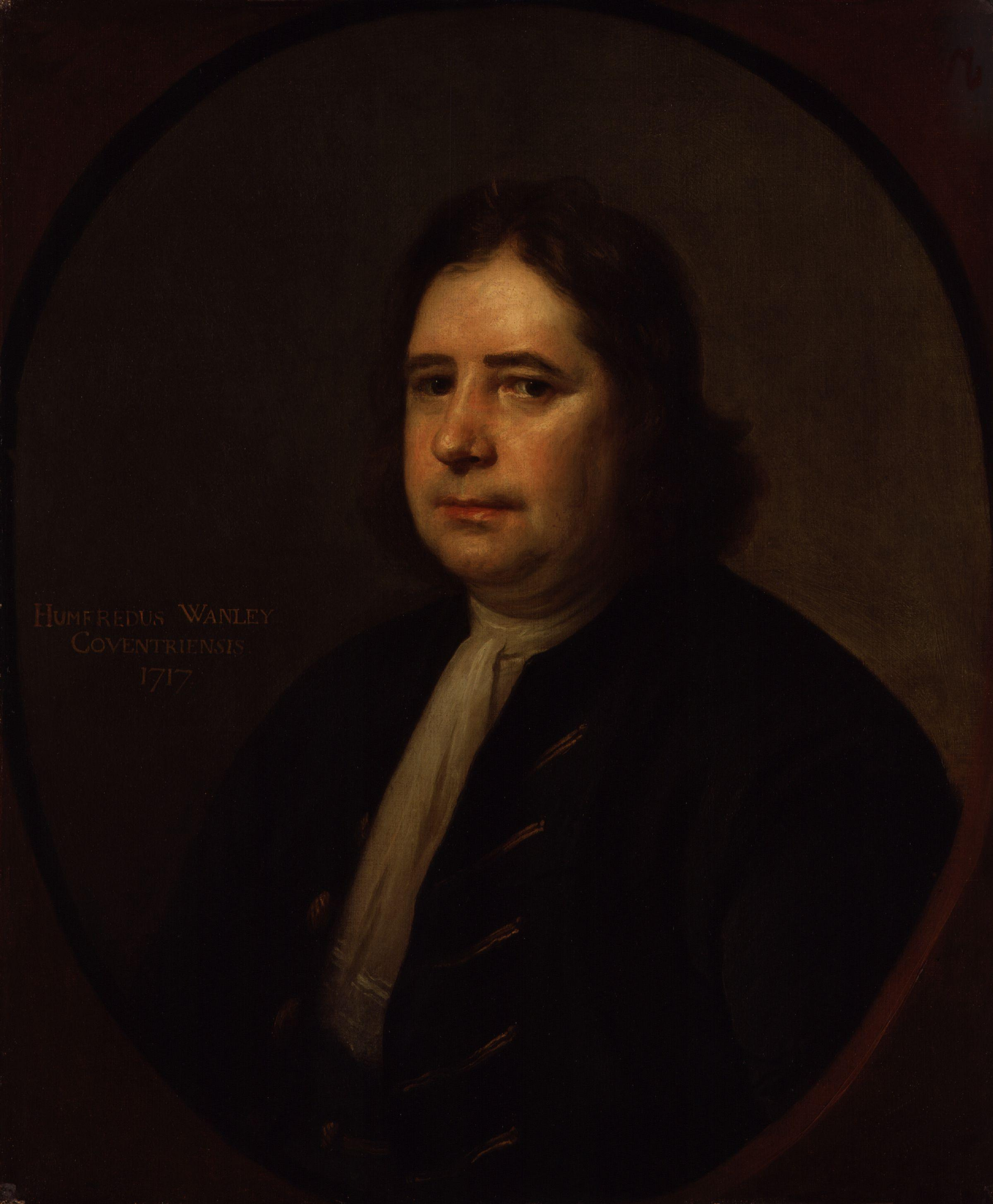
Wanley, 1717, by Thomas Hill. The portrait currently hangs in the upper reading room of the Bodleian Library.

Wanley's talents were first publicly shown, when he was twenty-three, in compiling the catalogues of the manuscripts at King Henry VIII School, Coventry and the Collegiate Church of St Mary, Warwick, which are inserted in Edward Bernard's Catalogue of Manuscript (1697, ii. 33–4, 203–6), and he drew up "the very accurate but too brief" index to that work. In February 1695–6 he obtained, through Charlett's influence, the post of assistant in the Bodleian Library at a salary of £12 per year. At the end of that year, he received a special gift from the library of £10, and, in the beginning of 1700, a donation of £15 "for his pains about Dr. Bernard's books". This second contribution was for selecting from Bernard's printed books such as were suitable for purchase on behalf of the library. The selection led to a disagreement with Thomas Hyde, the head librarian, which was, however, soon reconciled. By 1698 Hyde wished Wanley to be appointed as his successor. But he had no degree, and without one he was ineligible. About 1698, he was preparing a work on diplomacy. The account of the Bodleian Library in Edward Chamberlayne's State of England (1704) is by him.

During 1699 and 1700, Wanley was engaged by George Hickes in searching through various parts of England for Anglo-Saxon manuscripts, and this led to his drawing up the catalogue of such manuscripts published in 1705 as the second volume of the Linguarum Veterum Septentrionalium Thesaurus of Hickes. The dedication (dated 28 August 1704) to Robert Harley, acknowledging the benefits received from him, was written in English and translated into Latin by Edward Thwaites. Wanley had been introduced by Hickes to Harley, on 23 April 1701, with the highest praise for "the best skill in ancient hands and manuscripts of any man, not only of this [...] but of any former age". This introduction and dedication later on procured Wanley's advancement.

Wanley desired in December 1699 to be deputy-librarian to Bentley at the king's library, but this was denied him. The post of assistant to the secretary of the Society for Promoting Christian Knowledge, offered to him through the influence of Robert Nelson, on 16 December 1700, with a salary of £40 per year, was "thankfully accepted". He was promoted on 5 March 1701/2 to be secretary, with an annual salary of £70, and he retained the post until on or about 24 June 1708. Three letters from him relating to the society are printed in John Nichols's Illustrations of Literature, and to promote its objects he translated from the French J. F. Ostervald's Grounds and Principles of the Christian Religion (1704, 7th edit. 1765).

The manuscript report of Wanley, John Anstis, and Matthew Hutton on the state of the Cottonian Library (dated 22 June 1703) is prefixed to a copy of Thomas Smith's Catalogue (1696) of the Cottonian manuscripts in the king's library at the British Museum. It also contains Wanley's manuscript catalogue of the charters in the collection. He communicated to Harley in 1703 the possibility of effecting the purchase of the Simonds d'Ewes collections, and they were bought through his agency in 1706. In 1708 he was employed by Harley to catalogue the Harleian manuscripts, and he then became "library-keeper" in turn to him and his son, the Edward Harley, 2nd Earl of Oxford and Earl Mortimer. By the time of his death he had finished the collation of No. 2407, and the catalogue remains as a monument of "his extensive learning and the solidity of his judgment".

According to biographer William Prideaux Courtney, "Wanley was the embodiment of honesty and industry [and] was also a keen bargainer". He often secured for his patron many desirable blocks of books and manuscripts. His journal, from 2 March 1714–15 to 23 June 1726, is in Lansdowne MSS, 771–2, and contains many amusing entries. The diary has been published by C.E. Wright and Ruth C. Wright under the title, The diary of Humfrey Wanley, 1715-1726 (1966). Memoranda by him of the prices of books are in Lansdowne MS 677, but the opening leaves are wanting. He wrote the account of the Harleian Library in Nicolson's Historical Libraries (1736). Through Harley he became known to Alexander Pope, who used to imitate his ‘"tilted turns of phraseology and elaboration of manner," and addressed two letters to him in 1725. John Gay introduced him, "from thy shelves with dust besprent" into his poem of "Mr. Pope's Welcome from Greece."

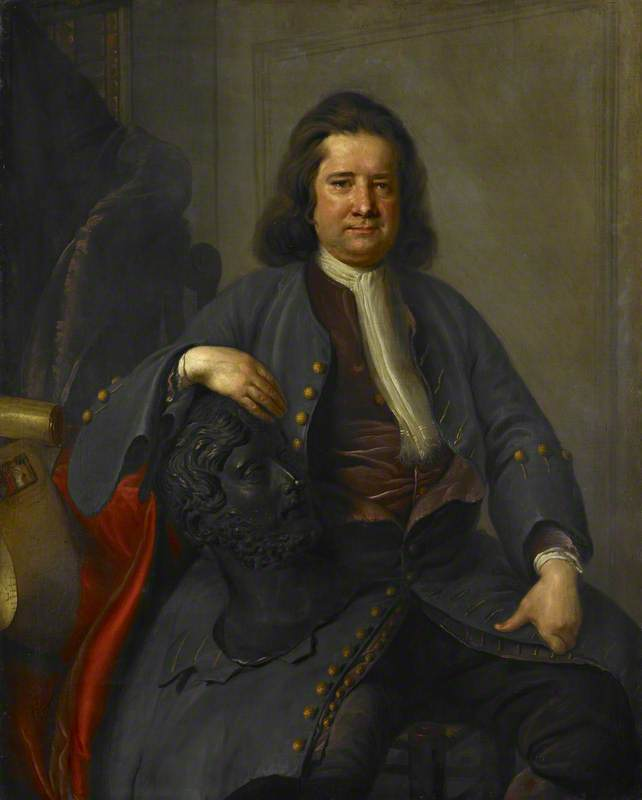
Wanley, 1722, by Thomas Hill.

Wanley's minutes of the meetings of some antiquaries at a tavern in 1707 are in Harleian MS. 7055. This was the germ of the present Society of Antiquaries of London, and on its revival in July 1717 he became an FSA. A communication by him on judging the age of manuscripts is in the Philosophical Transactions (1705, pp. 1993–2008), and his account of Bagford's collections of printing is in the volume for 1707. His statement of the indentures between Henry VII and Westminster Abbey is in the "Will of King Henry VII" (1775). He transcribed from the Cottonian manuscripts for publication, with the patronage of Lord Weymouth, the "Chronicon Dunstapliæ," the "Benedicti Petroburgensis Chronicon," and the "Annales de Lanercost," but Weymouth's death in 1714 put an end to the design. The first two were afterwards published by Hearne, who inserted in the preface to the first work particulars of his life. Hearne at one time hated Wanley, and even accused him of theft. Wanley meditated an edition of the Bible in Saxon, a new edition of the Septuagint, a life of Cardinal Wolsey, and had proceeded some way in a work on handwriting.

Masses of letters to and from Wanley are in the collections of the British Museum and the Bodleian Library. Many of them are in the Pepys' diary, Thomas Hearne's Collections, John Nichols' Literary Anecdotes, Ellis's Original Letters and Letters of Literary Men, Letters from Bodleian Library, and Notes and Queries. His collection of bibles and prayer-books is set out in the Gentleman's Magazine (1816); it was purchased in 1726, shortly before his death, by the dean and chapter of St. Paul's. Several volumes at the British Museum have copious notes in his handwriting; his additions to Anthony Wood's Athenæ Oxonienses are contained in a copy in the library of the Royal Institution.

Three portraits of Wanley were painted by Thomas Hill; one, dated 18 December 1711, belongs to the Society of Antiquaries; another, dated September 1717, was transferred in 1879 from the British Museum to the National Portrait Gallery, and the third remains in the students' room in the manuscripts department of the British Museum. A fourth portrait is at the Bodleian, showing a countenance, says Dibdin, "absolutely peppered with variolous indentations". Engravings after Hill were executed by John Smith and Abraham Wivell.

== Personal life and death ==
Wanley often suffered from ill-health, and died of dropsy at Clarges Street, Hanover Square, London, on 6 July 1726. He was buried within the altar-rails of St Marylebone Parish Church, and an inscription was put up to his memory. He married, at St Swithin, London Stone, on 1 May 1705, Anna, daughter of Thomas Bourchier of Newcastle upon Tyne, and widow of Bernard Martin Berenclow. She was buried at St Paul's, Covent Garden, on 5 January 1721–2. Of their three children, one was stillborn and the other two died in infancy. His second wife was Ann, who afterwards married William Lloyd of St James's, Westminster, and was buried in Marylebone church, a monument to her memory being placed against the north wall at the eastern end. Administration of Wanley's effects was granted to her on 3 November 1726.

== Legacy ==
Wanley contributed much to the scholarship of Old English literature. His 1705 catalogue of Anglo-Saxon manuscripts, Antiquae literaturae septentrionalis liber alter. Seu Humphredi Wanleii ... cum totius thesauri linguarum septentrionalium sex indicibus, was of paramount importance in the field. According to Neil Ripley Ker, Wanley was a "great paleographer....His catalogue of Anglo-Saxon manuscripts is a book which scholars will continue to use, or neglect at their peril."
