= Guilford (White Post, Virginia) =

Historic house in Virginia, United States

- U.S. National Register of Historic Places
- Virginia Landmarks Register
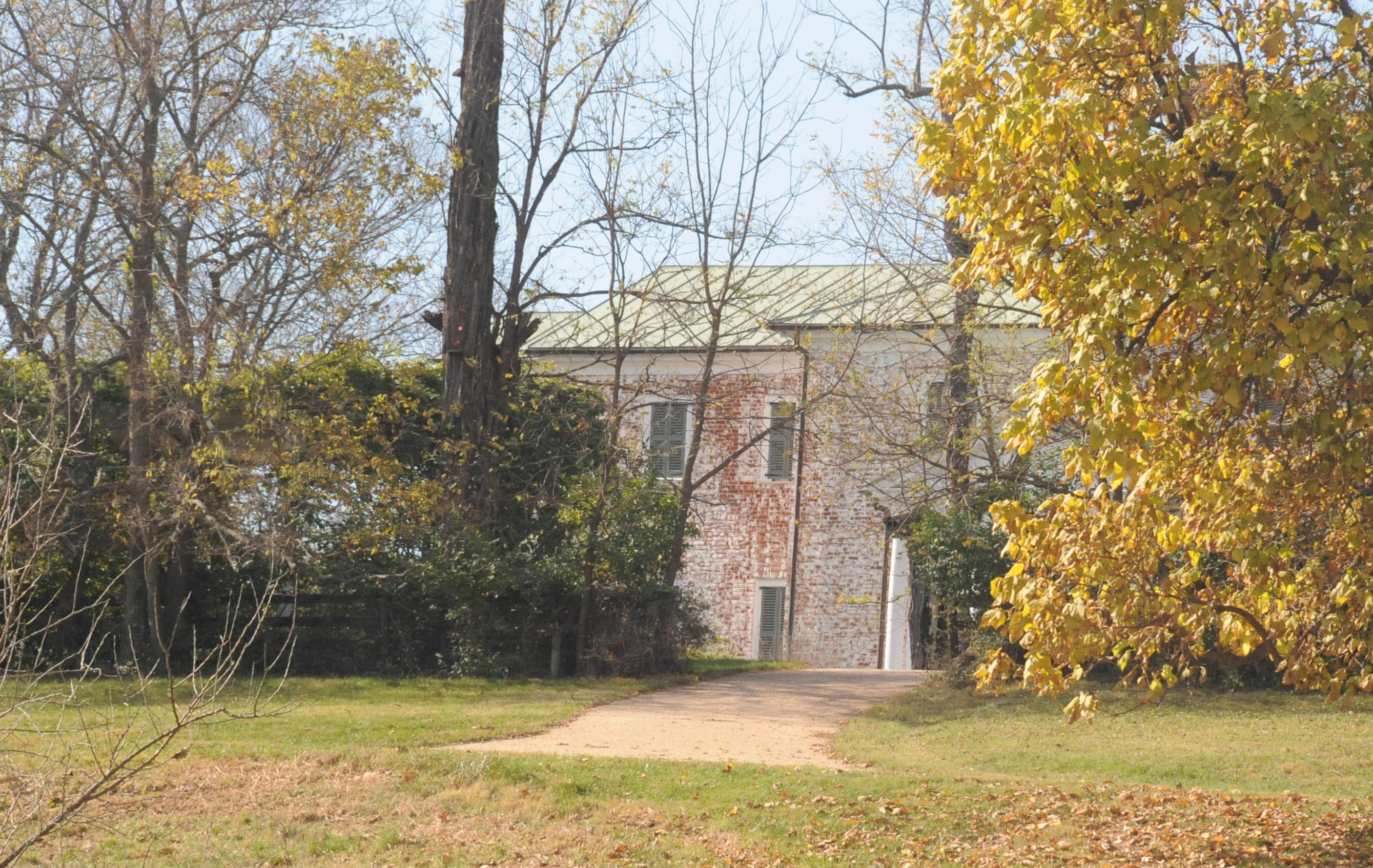

- Location within Northern Virginia Location within Virginia Location within the United States
- Location: VA 644 S side, 0.5 mi. W of jct. with VA 658, near White Post, Virginia
- Coordinates: 39°00′57″N 78°05′58″W
- Area: 123 acres (50 ha)
- Built: c. 1812-1820
- Architectural style: Greek Revival, Early Classical Revival
- NRHP reference No.: 93000004
- VLR No.: 021-0039

Significant dates
- Added to NRHP: February 4, 1993
- Designated VLR: December 9, 1992

Guilford is a historic plantation house and a farm located near White Post, Clarke County, Virginia. It was built between 1812 and 1820, and is a two-story, nearly square, brick dwelling with a hipped roof in the Greek Revival style. The front facade features a full-height, three-bay, pedimented portico with monumental Greek Ionic order columns. Also on the property is a contributing brick slave's quarters.

It was listed on the National Register of Historic Places in 1993.
