= Bethel Memorial Church =

Historic church in Virginia, United States

- U.S. National Register of Historic Places
- Virginia Landmarks Register
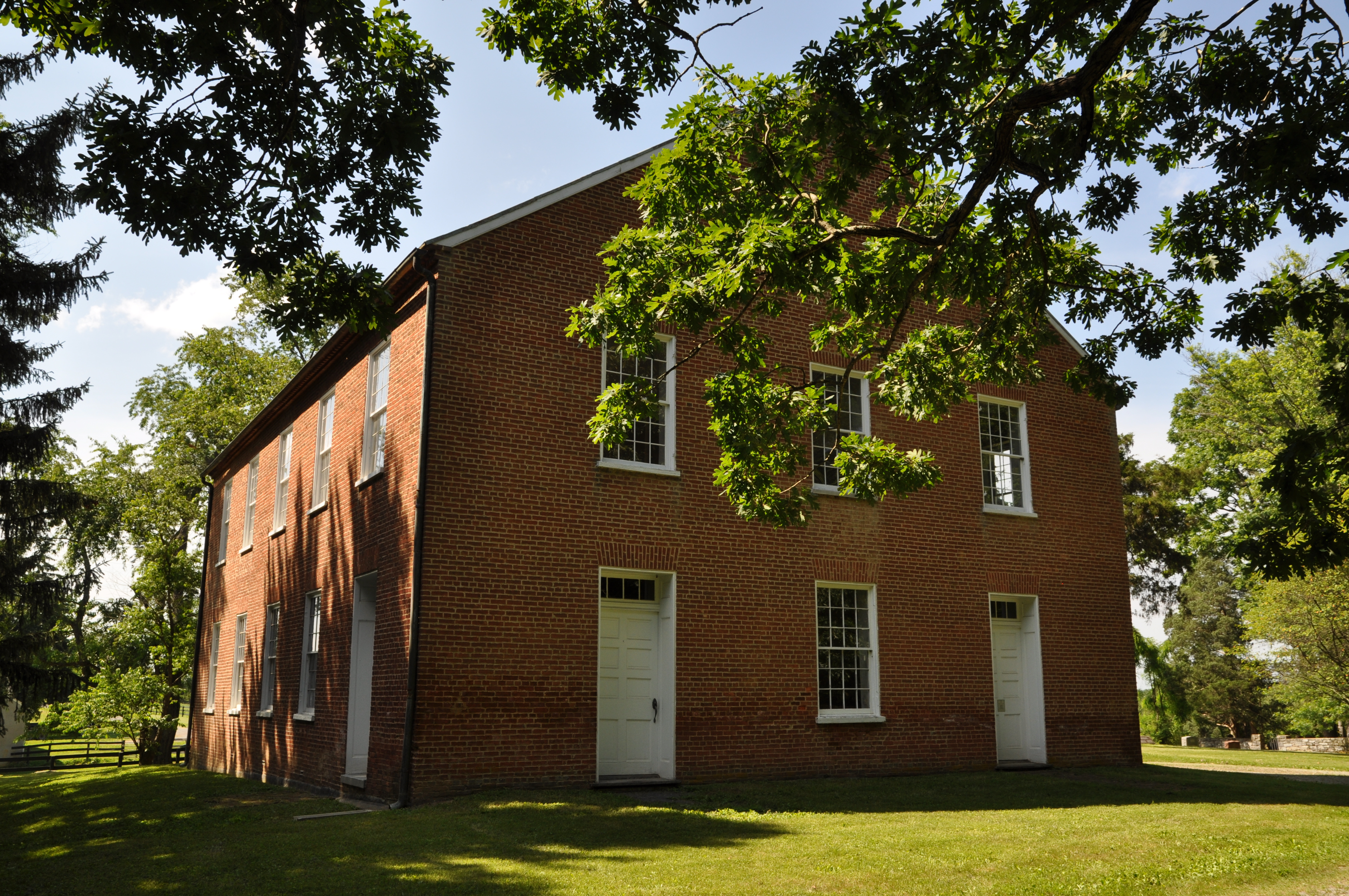

- Location within Northern Virginia Location within Virginia Location within the United States
- Location: Co. Rt. 622, White Post, Virginia
- Coordinates: 39°1′44″N 78°2′49″W
- Area: 1.4 acres (0.57 ha)
- Built: 1833-1836
- Architectural style: Federal
- NRHP reference No.: 89001927
- VLR No.: 021-0035

Significant dates
- Added to NRHP: February 7, 1991
- Designated VLR: April 18, 1989

Bethel Memorial Church, also known as Bethel Baptist Memorial Church, is a historic Baptist church building located at White Post, Clarke County, Virginia. It replaced an earlier log Quaker meeting house, used by the Baptist congregation from 1808. Bethel was built between 1833 and 1836, and is a two-story, rectangular brick church in the Federal style. It has a front gable roof. The interior features many well-preserved elements including oil lamps installed in 1874 and grain painted pews. The front of the church features separate entrance doors for men and women. Also on the property is a contributing church cemetery.

It was listed on the National Register of Historic Places in 1991.
