= John Wigan (physician) =

British physician and author (1696–1739)

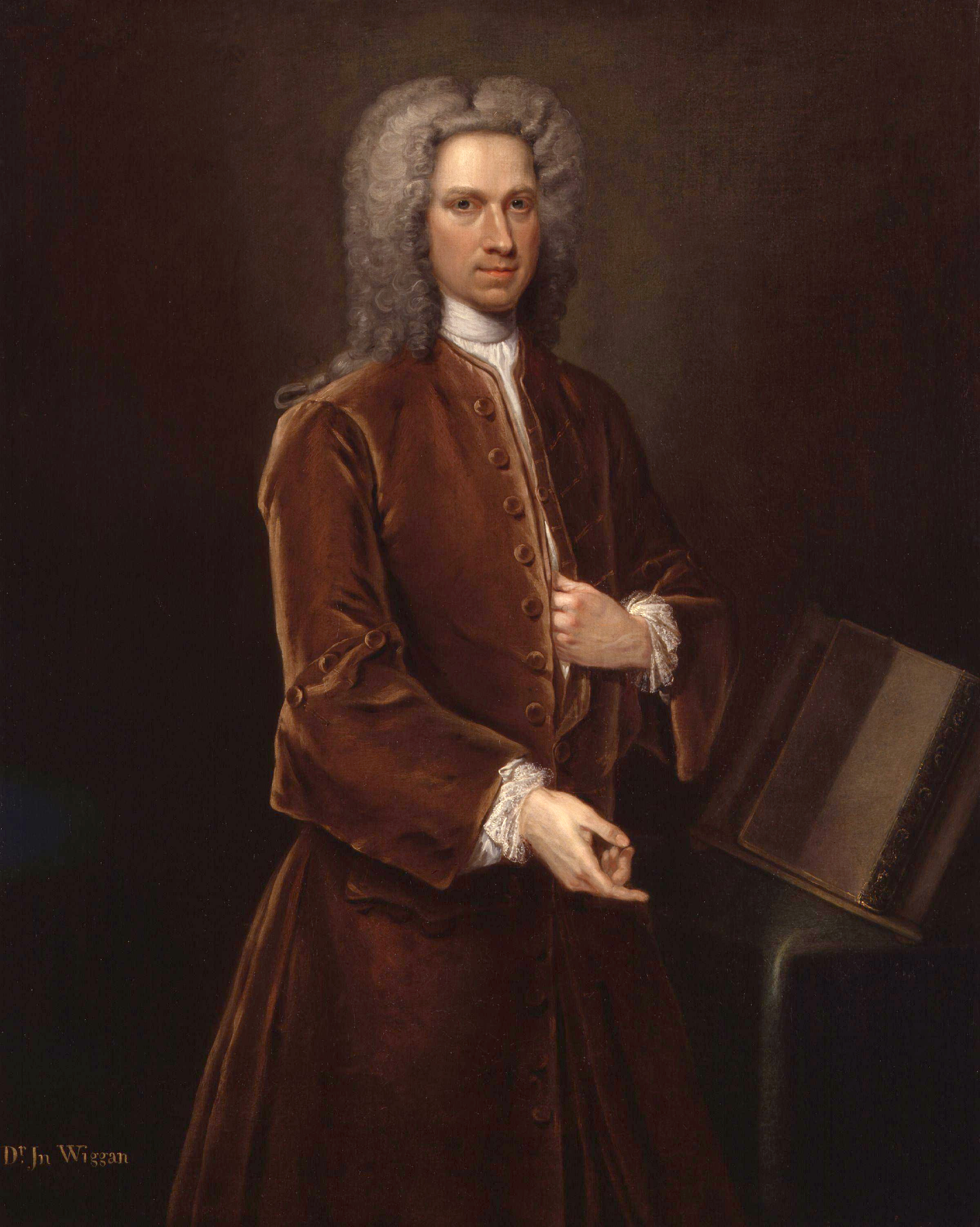
- John Wigan, circa 1726-1739
- Born: 31 January 1696; Kensington, Middlesex, England
- Died: 5 December 1739 (aged 43); Spanish Town, Jamaica
- Resting place: St Catherine's Church, Spanish Town
- Occupation: Physician
- Parent(s): William Wigan, Mary Sonds
- Relatives: George Wigan

John Wigan (/ˈwɪɡən/; 31 January 1696 – 5 December 1739) was a British physician, poet and author of the early eighteenth century whose writings and translations were popular and widely referred to during the period. He served as principal of New Inn Hall at Oxford University between 1726 and 1732 and was physician of Westminster Hospital between 1733 and 1738. In 1738 he travelled to Jamaica with Edward Trelawny and died there a year later in December 1739.

== Career ==
John Wigan was born in 1696, the son of William Wigan, rector of Kensington and Mary (née Sonds). At 14, Wigan was admitted to Westminster School and from there moved to Christ Church, Oxford where he obtained his BA, MA and MD. In 1726, during his final year of studies he was made principal of New Inn Hall and was already a celebrated writer on medical topics and poet. His 1723 translation of the works of Aretaeus of Cappadocia was widely remarked on and was used as the basis of Herman Boerhaave's work on the same topic. His poetry was well received and was published in the "Carmina quadragesimalia" and elsewhere.

In 1731, Wigan was admitted to the Royal College of Surgeons and moved to Craig's Court in London. In 1733 he was elected to the post of physician at Westminster Hospital which he retained until 1738, when he travelled to Jamaica with old friend Edward Trelawny. Trelawny settled in Spanish Town, and Wigan married Mary Wheeler, daughter of planter John Douce soon afterwards. The couple had one daughter. In late 1739, Wigan died at Spanish Town and was buried under a black marble slab at St Catherine's Cathedral Church.
