= Springthorpe =

Village and civil parish in the West Lindsey district of Lincolnshire, England

Coordinates: 53.396790°N 0.6844°W

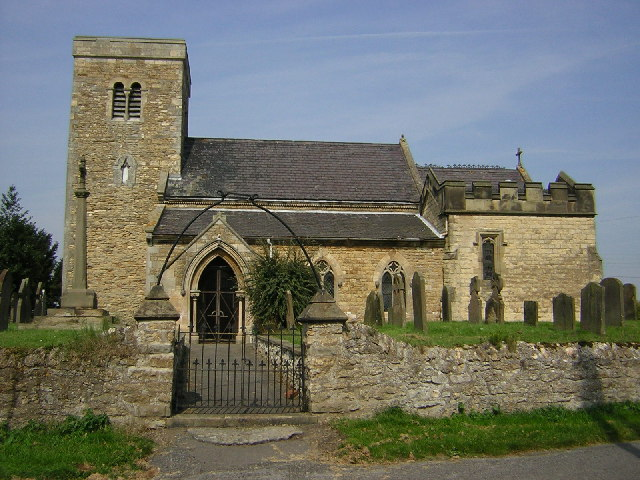
- Church of St Lawrence and St George, Springthorpe

- Location within Lincolnshire
- Population: 138 (2011)
- OS grid reference: SK875896
  - London: 135 mi (217 km) S
- District: West Lindsey
- Shire county: Lincolnshire
- Region: East Midlands
- Country: England
- Sovereign state: United Kingdom
- Post town: Gainsborough
- Postcode district: DN21
- Police: Lincolnshire
- Fire: Lincolnshire
- Ambulance: East Midlands
- UK Parliament: Gainsborough

Springthorpe is a village and civil parish in the West Lindsey district of Lincolnshire, England. The population of the civil parish at the 2011 census was 138. It is situated approximately 4 miles (6 km) east from the town of Gainsborough.

Springthorpe is listed in Domesday Book as "Springetorp", consisting of 21 households and a church.

The limestone parish church, which is dedicated to Saint Lawrence and Saint George, is a Grade I listed building dating from the 11th century, and restored in 1865. The font is 13th-century.

The deserted medieval village of "Sturgate" or "Stourgate" was in the parish, and was documented from the end of the 12th century.
