= White Post, Virginia =

Unincorporated community in Virginia, United States

- Unincorporated community
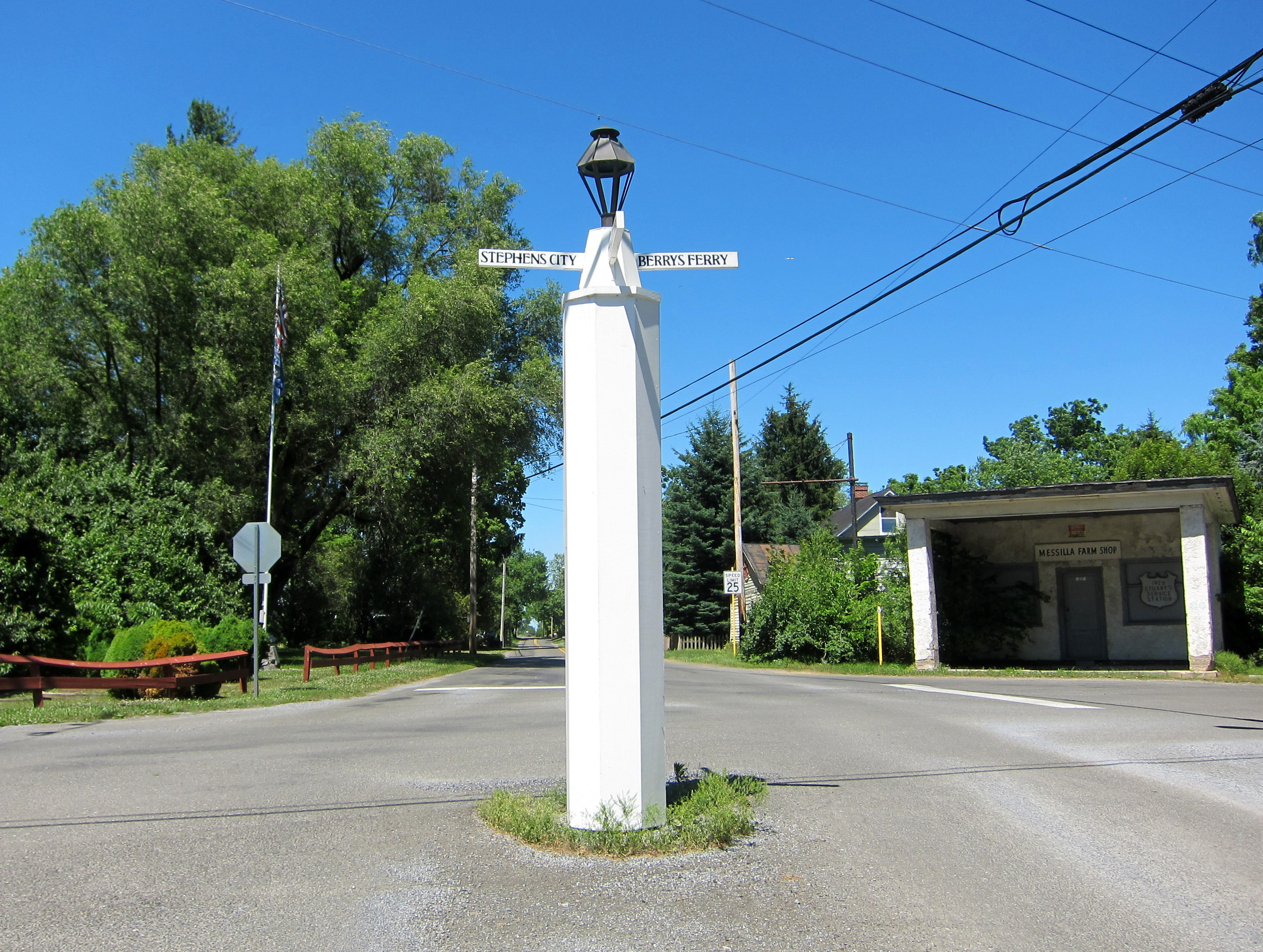
- The "White Post" in the intersection of White Post Road and Berrys Ferry Road

- Location within the Commonwealth of Virginia White; Post (Virginia) White; Post (the United States)
- Coordinates: 39°3′25″N 78°6′13″W
- Country: United States
- State: Virginia
- County: Clarke
- Time zone: UTC−5 (Eastern (EST))
  - Summer (DST): UTC−4 (EDT)
- ZIP codes: 22663

White Post is an unincorporated community in Clarke County, Virginia, United States. White Post is located at the crossroads of White Post Road and Berrys Ferry Road off Lord Fairfax Highway (U.S. Route 340).

In the 1730s, Thomas Fairfax, 6th Lord Fairfax of Cameron (1693–1781), the major landowner in the lower Shenandoah Valley through an inheritance from his mother Catherine Culpeper, Lady Fairfax, settled here and built his "Greenway Court" manor home. According to a tradition currently inscribed on a bronze plaque affixed to the post, then Col. George Washington set the original post to guide travelers to Lord Fairfax's residence. Greenway Court plantation was unusual in that Lord Fairfax was titled and residing in the colony. Ethnic German and Scots-Irish subsistence farmers, many of them recent immigrants, settled in the area, as well as the Meade, Randolph and Burwell families, which were among the First Families of Virginia. Although the original Anglican church for the community was at Old Chapel several miles away, by the late 19th century, Meade Memorial Church (Episcopal), a Methodist church and Masonic Lodge were all established near the intersection that gave the community its name.

In addition to Greenway Court, the Bethel Memorial Church, Farnley, Guilford, Lucky Hit, Meadea, The Tuleyries, and the White Post Historic District are listed on the National Register of Historic Places.
