= John Ernest Grabe =

German Anglican divine (1666–1711)

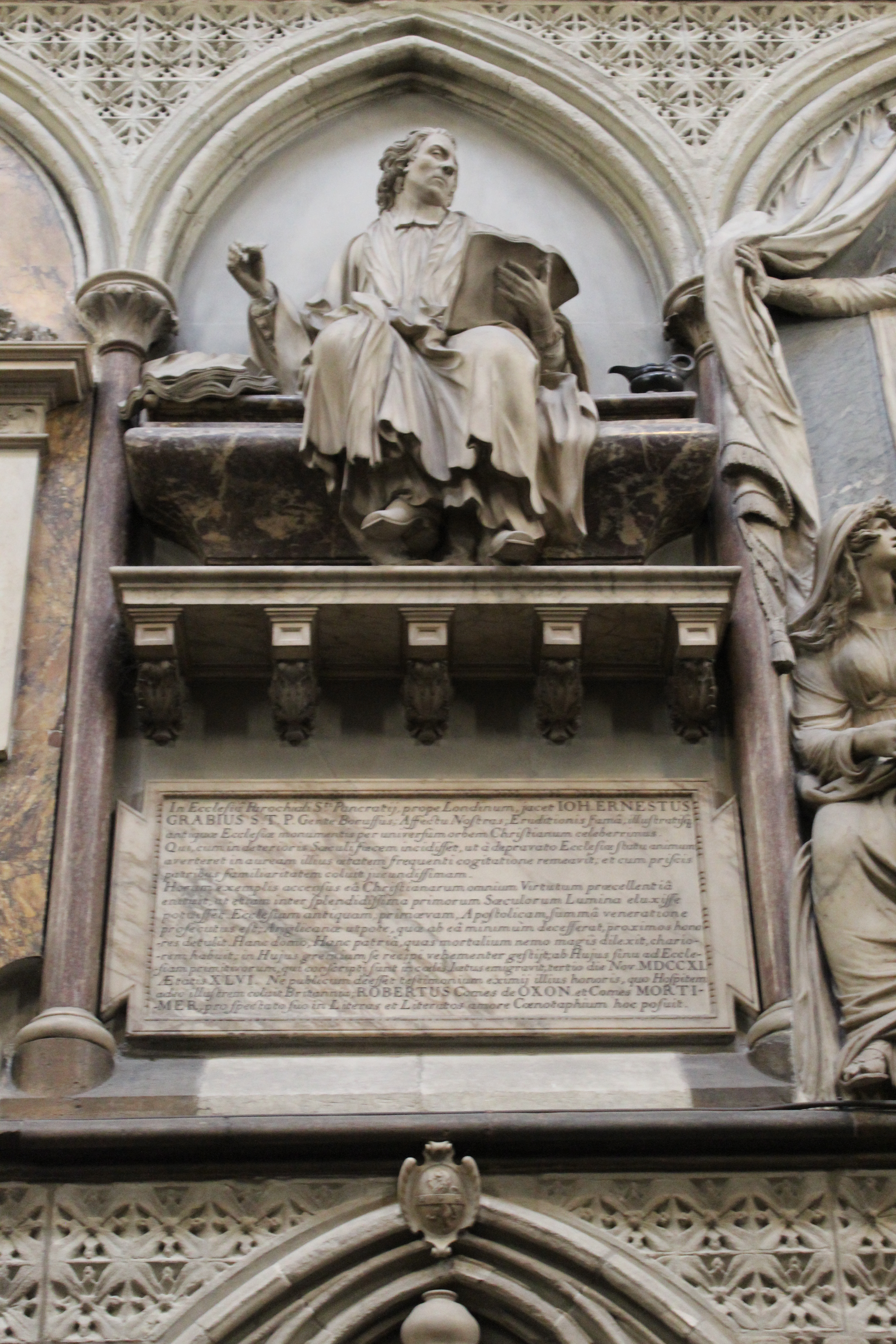
Monument to John Ernest Grabe, Westminster Abbey

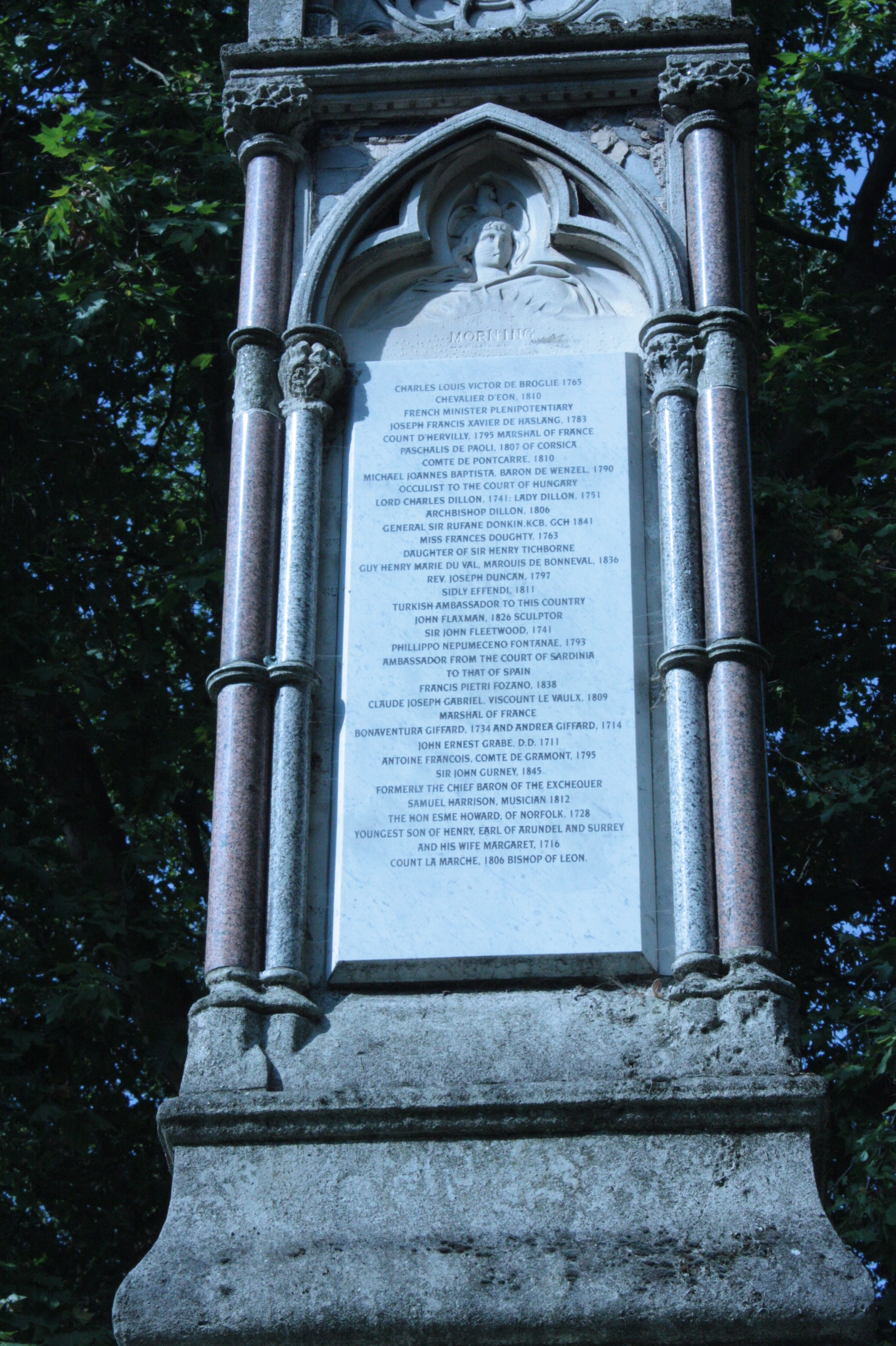
Grabe's name listed on the south face of the Burdett Coutts memorial

John Ernest Grabe (10 July 1666 – 3 November 1711), Anglican divine, was born at Königsberg, where his father, Martin Sylvester Grabe, was professor of theology and history.

== Life ==
In his theological studies Grabe succeeded in persuading himself of the schismatical character of the Reformation, and accordingly he presented to the Lutheran consistory of Samland in Prussia a memorial in which he compared the position of the evangelical Protestant churches with that of the Novatians and other ancient schismatics. He had resolved to join the Church of Rome when a commission of Lutheran divines pointed out flaws in his written argument and called his attention to the English Church as apparently possessing that apostolic succession and manifesting that fidelity to ancient institutions which he desired.

He came to England, settled in Oxford, and made heavy use of the Bodleian Library. He was ordained in 1700, and became chaplain of Christ Church. His inclination was towards the party of the Nonjurors. The learned labours to which the remainder of his life was devoted were rewarded with an Oxford degree (DD) and a royal pension.

He died on 3 November 1711. He was buried in St Pancras Old Church, London on 9 November 1711. His name is listed on the Burdett Coutts Memorial as one of the important graves lost. In 1726 a monument by Francis Bird was erected to him by Edward Harley, Earl of Oxford, in Westminster Abbey.

Some account of Grabe's life is given in Robert Nelson's Life of George Bull, and by George Hickes in a discourse prefixed to the pamphlet against William Whiston's Collection of Testimonies against the True Deity of the Son and of the Holy Ghost. Dr George Smalridge (who also granted him his degree) wrote a biography of Grabe.

== Works ==
His works, which show him to have been learned and laborious but somewhat deficient in critical acumen, include a Spicilegium SS. Patrum et haereticorum (1698-1699), which was designed to cover the first three centuries of the Christian church, but was not continued beyond the close of the second. A second edition of this work was published in 1714.

He brought out editions of:

- Justin Martyr, Apologia prima (1700)
- Irenaeus, Adversus omnes haereses (1702)
- Bishop Bull's Latin works (1703).
- Septuaginta interpretum. tomus 1. Oxford 1707

His edition of the Septuagint was based on the Codex Alexandrinus; it appeared in four volumes (1707–1720), and was completed by Francis Lee and by George Wigan.
