= Richard Kidder =

English bishop (1633–1703)

- Bishop of Bath and Wells
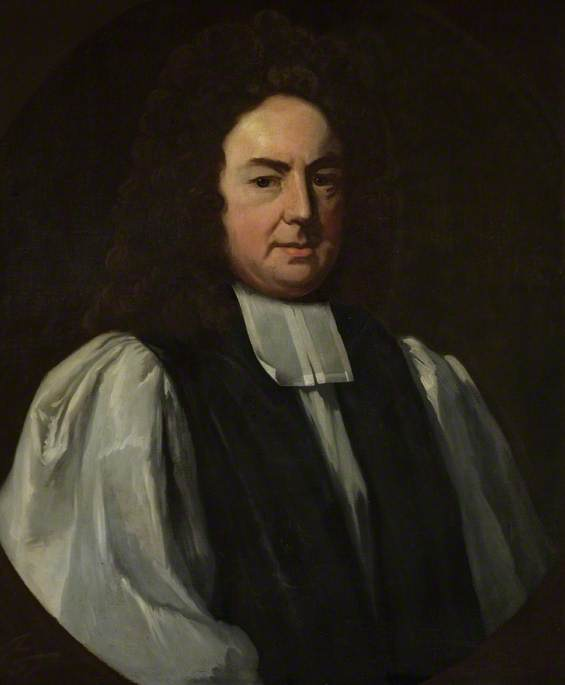
- Kidder by Mary Beale
- Church: Church of England
- Province: Canterbury
- Diocese: Bath and Wells

Orders
- Ordination: November 1658 by Ralph Brownrigg
- Consecration: 30 August 1691 by John Tillotson

Personal details
- Born: 1633
- Died: 26 November 1703 (aged 69–70) Wells, England, Kingdom of England
- Buried: Wells Cathedral
- Denomination: Anglicanism
- Residence: Bishop's Palace, Wells
- Spouse: Elizabeth Jane Kidder née Howell
- Children: Susannah
- Education: Emmanuel College, Cambridge

Richard Kidder (1633 – 26 November 1703) was an English Anglican churchman, Bishop of Bath and Wells, from 1691 to his death. He was a noted theologian.

== Biography ==
He was educated at Emmanuel College, Cambridge, where he was a sizar, from 1649, graduating 1652. He became a Fellow there in 1655, and vicar of Stanground, Huntingdonshire, in 1659. He was deprived in 1662.

He was rector of Rayne Parva, Essex, from 1664 to 1674, having conformed to the Act of Uniformity 1662. He was later vicar of St. Martin Outwich, London, and in 1689 a royal chaplain, and dean of Peterborough.

His A Demonstration of the Messias has been identified as a significant influence on the librettist Charles Jennens, in writing the words for the Messiah of Handel. This book also took up suggestions of Joseph Mede on multiple authorship of the Book of Zechariah.

He was killed in the Great Storm of 1703, on 26 November (7 December in today's calendar); he was in bed with his wife in the episcopal palace at Wells when the chimney fell on both of them.

== Works ==
- The Christian sufferer supported (1680)
- A Demonstration of the Messias. In which the Truth of the Christian Religion is Proved, Against All the Enemies Thereof; But Especially Against the Jews. In Three Parts (1684, 1699, 1700)
- A sermon upon the resurrection (1694)
- A Commentary on the Five Books of Moses: With a Dissertation Concerning the Author Or Writer of the said books and a general argument to each of them (1694)
- The life of the Reverend Anthony Horneck, late preacher at the Savoy (1698)
- The holy Bible, containing the Old and New Testaments (1715)
- A Discourse Concerning Sins of Infirmity, and Wilful Sins, with Another of Restitution (reprint, 2010)

== Notes ==
Church of England titles
Preceded by Simon Patrick	Dean of Peterborough; 1689–1691	Succeeded by Samuel Freeman
Preceded by Thomas Ken	Bishop of Bath and Wells; 1691–1703	Succeeded by George Hooper
