= Christ Episcopal Church (Winchester, Virginia) =

Church in Virginia, U.S.

Coordinates: 39.184893°N 78.168145°W

Christ Episcopal Church, Winchester
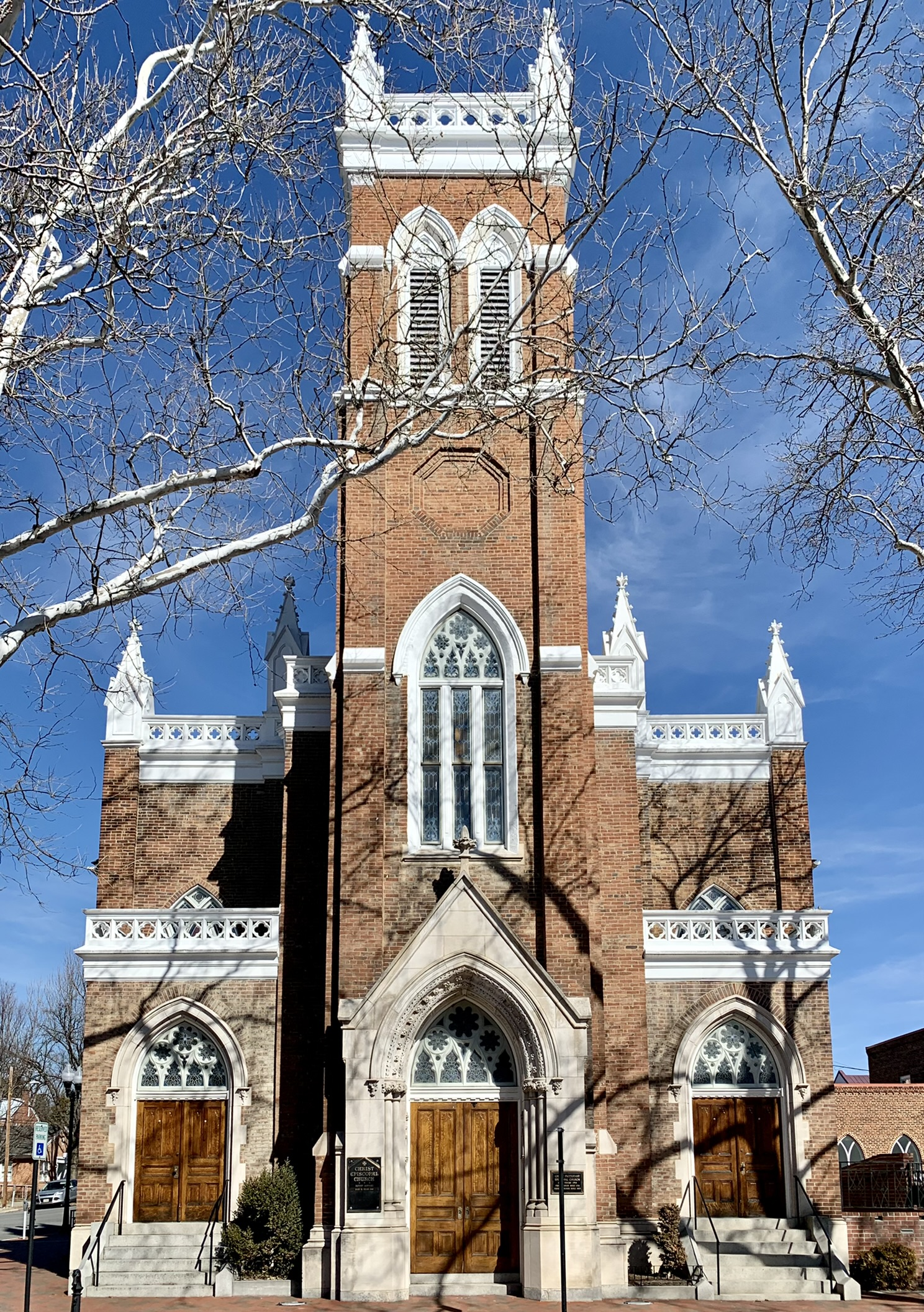
- Christ Episcopal Church, February 2022
- Christ Episcopal Church, Winchester
- Location: 140 W. Boscawen St (at Washington St) Frederick County, Virginia
- Country: U.S.
- Denomination: Anglican
- Churchmanship: Broad church
- Website: christchurchwinchester.org

History
- Founded: 1738
- Dedication: Christ
- Consecrated: 1829

Architecture
- Functional status: Active
- Heritage designation: Winchester Historic District contributing property
- Designated: pre-1980
- Architect: Robert Mills
- Architectural type: Church
- Style: Gothic
- Completed: 1828
- Construction cost: $5,300

Specifications
- Length: 65
- Width: 45

Administration
- Diocese: Episcopal Diocese of Virginia
- Parish: Frederick

Christ Church, or Christ Episcopal Church, is an Anglican church in Winchester, Frederick County, Virginia. The church was founded in 1738, with its first vestry elected in 1742. It is the seat of Frederick Parish, Diocese of Virginia, which once covered half of the Shenandoah Valley and western Virginia, including what became West Virginia. The current church building, the parish's third, was designed by Robert Mills (who also designed the Washington Monument and Monumental Church in Richmond, Virginia) - it was completed in 1828, and is the oldest church building continuously used for religious purposes in the county. It is a contributing building in the local Historic District which predates the National Register of Historic Places, and which has been expanded three times since 1980.

The early organizational history of Christ Church differs significantly from that of the Episcopal Church in Frederick, Maryland, the nearby and similar gateway parish during colonial era settlement in Maryland, although the two churches had similar experiences of expansion and during the American Civil War, and remain prominent both architecturally and socially in their historic towns. Christ Church is now one of five Anglican churches in the historic Virginia gateway city. The other churches are: historic St. Paul African Methodist Episcopal (founded in 1867, one of the first AME churches and also a contributing building to the historic district), St. Paul's on the Hill (which began as a mission of this church at the city's outskirts in 1966 and became an independent parish in 1996), St. Michael Anglican Church (founded by a British movement and using the 1928 Book of Common Prayer) and Winchester Anglican Church (founded as a mission of the Anglican Church in North America circa 2010).

== History ==
=== Parish founding ===
King Charles II of England made a large land grant to Lord Culpeper in 1664, which was mapped in the next century. By 1690, the Shawnee had a settlement at the northern end of the Shenandoah Valley, Shawnee Springs, so a trading post was established. Lord Fairfax succeeded to the land grant in 1710 by marrying Lord Culpeper's daughter, but legal title for the land between the "first heads" of the Rappahannock and Potomac rivers was unclear. Alexander Hollingsworth, a Quaker from Maryland, became the first documented settler when he in 1729 built a cabin near the Shawnee village. By the end of the next decade, Lord Fairfax won the legal dispute and allowed construction of the first houses in what became Winchester. By that time emigrant Quakers had set up the first house of worship Hopewell Meeting in what today is Frederick County. Soon so did Lutheran immigrants from Germany via New York and Pennsylvania led by Jost Hite, as well as Scots-Irish Presbyterians who in 1736 requested ministers from Donegal presbytery in Pennsylvania to visit them.

At the outset, all the Shenandoah Valley was considered part of Orange County, Virginia and the established parish was St. Mark's. However, no record exists that Anglican clergy visited the valley in that era, nor that that parish vestry handled social service work expected of the established church. In fact, Governor William Gooch, upon receiving a letter from the Presbyterian Synod in Philadelphia about how they worshipped according to the established forms of the Church of Scotland, assured them they would be allowed to worship publicly in their own way in Virginia so long as they followed the terms of the English Toleration Act 1688 and registered their ministers and places of worship with the local county court.

In 1738, Virginia's General Assembly created two new counties from the western area of Orange County: Frederick County in the northwest and Augusta County in the southwest were named after the Prince and Princess of Wales respectively. In 1744, the local Frederick County justices (the court being organized in late 1743) wrote Governor Gooch, who authorized election of 12 vestryman. The vestry elected as churchwardens James Wood Sr. (who had first come to the area as Lord Fairfax's surveyor) and Thomas Rutherford (who was also the county's first sheriff and lived in what later became Berkeley, West Virginia). Wood set aside some of his land near the Shawnee Spring as a town which would become the county seat, selling 22 lots to individuals and reserving lots for a courthouse, jail, parish church and cemetery. While the trading post had been established nearby at Opequon, also known as Frederick's Town, Wood named the new town Winchester after his native English city.

The parish's first wooden church was partly built by the end of the 1740s, amidst controversy concerning use of the funds allocated to build several chapels of ease in the still-huge parish. Plus, the first minister, the Rev. John Gordon, realized that his salary was far lower than those of ministers in Virginia counties where tobacco grew (the annual salary was 16,000 pounds of tobacco, but since Frederick and Augusta counties grew little tobacco, legislation allowed payment in cash as a rate of three farthings a pound, or only £74 in 1747). The first chapels were probably McKay's Chapel (near Front Royal in Warren County), Cunningham Chapel in what later became Clarke County, Morgan's Chapel at Bunker Hill in what later became Berkeley County, West Virginia, and Mecklenburg Chapel near Shepardstown in what later became Jefferson County, West Virginia. In 1752, Virginia's General Assembly dissolved the Frederick Parish vestry for misappropriating £1,570 levied to build the structures, perhaps because vestryman Andrew Campbell had fled to Carolina rather than turn over that year's levy for the building, clergy salary and social service duties.

The new 1752 vestry included Lord Fairfax, his nephew Thomas Bryan Martin, Gabriel Jones (the attorney who had prosecuted Campbell) and Captain John Ashby (all of the established church) as well as Quakers James Cromley, Lewis Neill (the sheriff) and Isaac Perkins (all of whom had initiated the complaint against the initial vestry), plus Major John Hite (son of Jost Hite, who may have been still Lutheran), merchant Robert Lemon and Captain John Lindsay (of unknown religious affiliation but also on the County Court). Lord Fairfax in 1753 donated land as a glebe to support the minister, which remained parish property until the legal divisions of 1770. Also in 1753, the House of Burgesses decided that Gordon and his Augusta Parish counterpart, John Jones, should each receive a cash salary of £100.

The following year brought hostilities with the Indians and the French. Probably the vestry helped fleeing refugees or made provision for orphans and widows, although those parish records are lost. Records show that Virginia militia colonel George Washington arrived and set up camp in September 1755 and that with the assistance of vestryman Charles Smith, he was elected to represent Frederick County in the House of Burgesses in 1758, as well as that three of Gordon's horses were conscripted for the war effort. Gordon probably died in April, 1757, and his place was taken by the Rev. William Meldrum, who had arrived earlier that year and contracted to share ministerial duties with Gordon. By 1760, Meldrum had joined with Jones to petition the Burgesses for their salaries, since King George II repealed the act setting clergy salaries at £100, perhaps not realizing that the default was then only £50 (although in 1767 the legislature fixed clergy salaries at £91).

At the war's end, the westernmost section was split off as Hampshire parish (although it had problems organizing as well as attracting clergy), and the Frederick parish vestry allocated funds to repair McKay's Chapel. It also decided to replace the wooden church in Winchester with a stone church and build a poorhouse. Three vestryman and two other partners built the new church as well as a parish poorhouse by 1766. This church was considered the town's finest building until the Evangelical Lutheran congregation built a larger stone church and steeple (completed in 1772). Meldrum gave up his position, presumably at least in part over ongoing salary disputes, but while the vestry searched for a rector, he farmed nearby and was occasionally paid for clerical services, as were lay readers. A parishioner, Benjamin Sebastian, wanted to become ordained and agreed to serve as rector, but a year later accepted a position at St. Stephen's Church far to the east in Northumberland County. The vestry next hired Walter MacGowen, who had tutored George Washington's stepchildren, but after ordination he accepted a position in Maryland.

The vestry then hired the Rev. Charles Mynn Thruston, who had served in Col. William Byrd's regiment during the French and Indian War. Thruston was inducted in 1768 and served until the American Revolutionary War, despite complaints since 1770 that he was neglecting his preaching duties. Meanwhile, the vestry built two more chapels of ease, only to have the parish split once again. Virginia's legislature created Norborne Parish to cover the area which much later became Berkeley County, West Virginia, and Beckford Parish was created to serve Dunmore County (later Shenandoah County, Virginia) (after this parish had encouraged Rev. Peter Muhlenberg to move from Pennsylvania to serve those chapels because of his proficiency in German, which many Valley immigrants spoke).

=== American Revolutionary War and Alexander Balmain years ===
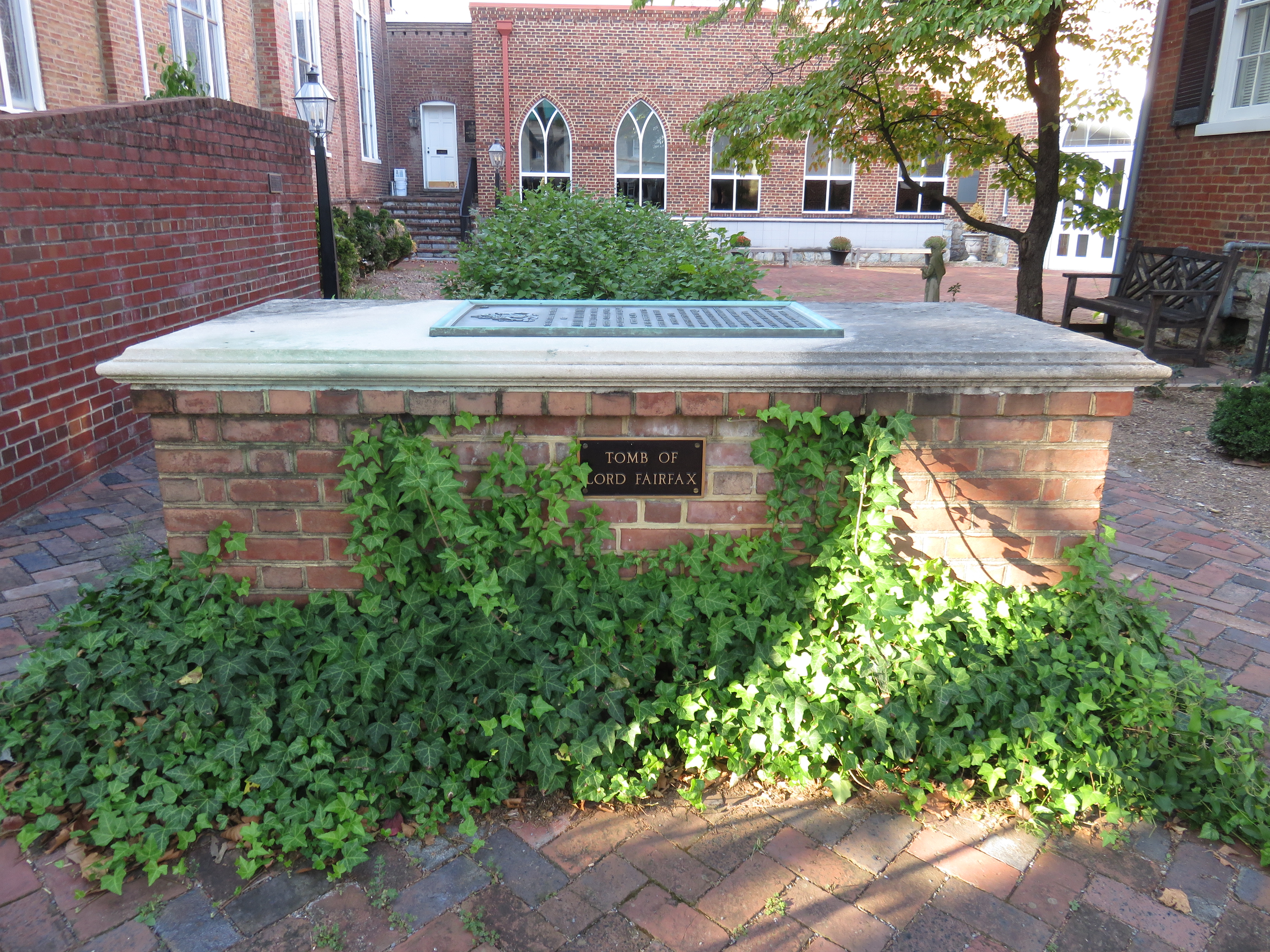
Tomb of Lord Fairfax at Christ Episcopal Church

The somewhat circuit-riding pastor, Charles Mynn Thruston, resigned in 1777 to join Virginia forces during the American Revolutionary War (as did all other 14 Valley rectors). He returned to farm near Winchester after losing an arm as a result of a battle wound, and continued a political career (which according to new Virginia laws was not permitted for clergymen). He and vestryman James Wood represented Frederick County in Virginia's Revolutionary Convention and the new General Assembly. Religious dissent had grown, as Baptists and Methodists now arrived in the valley to join the Presbyterians, Lutherans and Reformed. After Jefferson's religious freedom bill became law and established Virginia clergy no longer were paid from taxes, the newly elected county Overseers of the Poor took over the old vestry book, and lay readers probably held some services. Meanwhile, another long-term vestryman, the elderly Lord Fairfax (who had remained, though a Loyalist) died at his Greenway Court home in 1781, and was buried in the chancel of the Winchester church, the service being read by Rev. James Thomsom, rector of Leeds Parish (also within the aristocrat's lands).

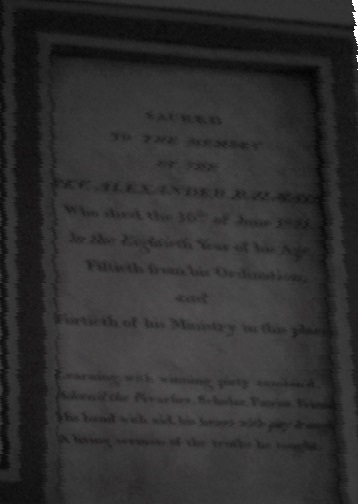

In 1785, the Rev. Alexander Balmain (or Balmaine, 1740-1821), a Scotsman who had studied to become a Presbyterian minister at St. Andrew's before becoming successively tutor to the family of Richard Henry Lee, understudy to Jones and then rector of Augusta Parish and later chaplain to the 13th Virginia Regiment of the Continental Army and finally Muhlenberg's First Virginia Brigade, became Frederick Parish's rector. Balmain arrived in Winchester after marrying Lucy Taylor (1757-1841) of Orange. In addition to his meager military pension, he secured subscriptions from parishioners to pay for his services, as well as lived extremely frugally (limiting his wintertime fireplace use and renting out the glebe lands and giving the proceeds to the poor). Balmain attended the organizational convention of the Diocese of Virginia presided over by the Rev. James Madison (who later became a bishop) and served Frederick Parish over four decades (the longest of any rector to date) until his much-mourned death in 1821. He mentored several clergy, including parishioner William Meade, who decided to become a priest, and then served as rector of Cunningham Chapel Parish for 27 years, as well as later became the third Episcopal Bishop of Virginia.

Thus, despite Virginia's disestablishment of the Church of England (reestablished as the Episcopal Church at that postwar convention, but which also soon lost its church lands), Frederick Parish (including parishioners living at the remaining outlying chapels of ease now including Berryville, where several more Balmain subscribers lived) was one of only about a dozen parishes to survive disestablishment relatively intact. One of Balmain's last acts was to help form a missionary society for the Shenandoah Valley in 1820. Balmain also convince his cousin John Bruce to immigrate from Scotland. Vestryman Bruce also established the Winchester Academy and helped bring a railroad to Winchester before his death in 1855.

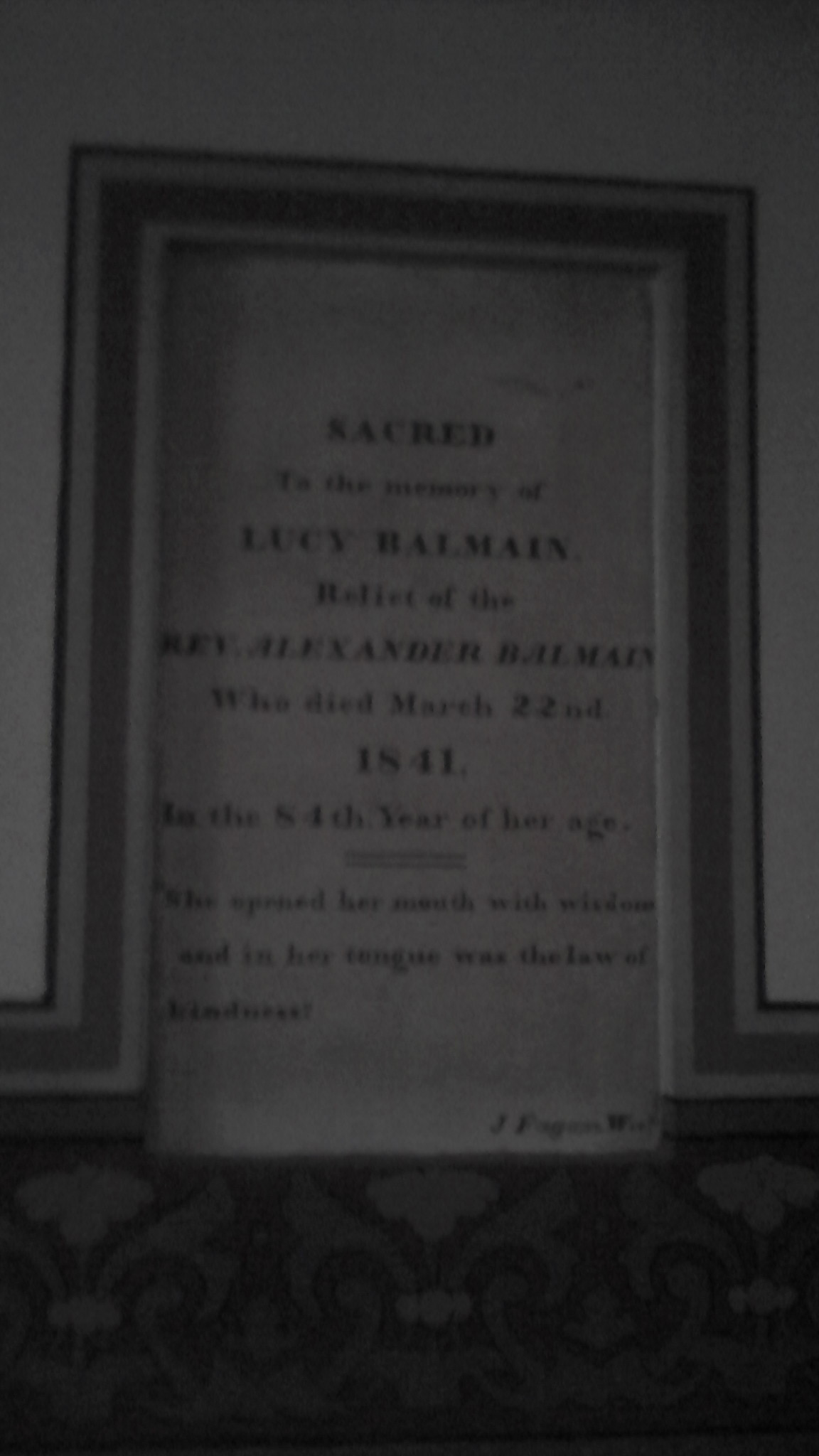

Balmain was also, like his protege Bishop Meade, active in the American Colonization Society. Also, McKay's Chapel (where he occasionally held services) had been founded by a Quaker between the Hopewell and Crooked Run meetings, and before the Revolutionary War, the lay reader was John Lloyd, an African American (although the McKays supposedly became Baptist after the Quakers refused to allow their members to own slaves). Balmain's last will and testament gave his wife Lucy the power to emancipate their slaves (whom Meade remembered them treating as their children) in her life or own last will (unlike Dolley Madison, Lucy Balmain did emancipate all her slaves when she died in 1845).

=== Meade years ===
After Balmain's death, Meade effectively served as the parish's priest-in-charge until 1845, although he was consecrated as the Rt. Rev. Channing Moore's assistant bishop (and probable successor) in 1829. Meade traveled and evangelized extensively, but continued to live near Cunningham Chapel. He engaged other priests to serve at Winchester, Bunker Hill and the Wickliffe chapel (consecrated 1819 and rebuilt and consecrated in 1846) as his assistants, as well as helped plant many congregations in Virginia, especially near the new railroad stations. In Virginia's diocesan convention of 1827, this parish was formally recognized as Christ Church, rather than as the Winchester Episcopal Church or Frederick Parish (which name stayed with Meade's parish for a while, until Clarke County split from Frederick and the two Berryville churches jointly took that parish name). As 1827 ended, Christ Church's vestry voted to tear down the old building and build a bigger brick and stone building in the Gothic Revival style then fashionable, following the design of noted architect Robert Mills (whose wife Eliza was born outside Winchester and kin to many active parishioners). John Bruce served as construction superintendent. The parish also acquired a new cemetery from the heirs of vestryman James Wood. As his first official act as newly consecrated assistant bishop of Virginia, Meade consecrated the new brick Christ Church on October 30, 1829. In 1830, the diocese held its annual convention in the new church (which proved to set the style for Winchester churches for decades).

The parish (and the Episcopal Church's Domestic and Foreign Missionary Board) sent its first overseas missionaries, the Rev. John Jacob Robertson and his wife, to Greece in 1830. They helped set up a school in Athens, and were soon joined by Mary Briscoe Baldwin of Frederick County (but sent by Augusta Parish in Staunton, where she had moved after her parents' deaths). In 1836, Clarke County was formally split from Frederick County, and in 1853 Old Chapel became part of Clarke Parish along with the new Grace Church in Berrywille, but that parish too split 1868, with the churches in Berryville (the county seat) taking the county name and Old Chapel and Christ Church Millwood collectively renamed Cunningham Chapel Parish. Meanwhile, in 1837, Meade consecrated St. Thomas Chapel at Middletown, Virginia, which Christ Church had planted and which remains today as a historic site as well as active parish.

The following year, Winchester was prospering and the Commonwealth's eighth largest town. The parish erected a parsonage, but its rector since 1824, the Rev. Edward Jackson, left for Kentucky in 1842, as did his successor, the Rev. William Yates Rooker in 1847. The parish's next rector (and first Virginia native), the Rev. Cornelius Walker, expanded the congregation as well as added a belltower to the church in 1855–56. However, he too soon left Winchester, to accept a call from Christ Church in Alexandria together with a professorship at his alma mater, Virginia Theological Seminary.

=== American Civil War ===
During the American Civil War, Winchester changed hands dozens of times and was the site of three major battles. Christ Church's new rector, the Rev. William Meredith, quickly enlisted as a private in the 4th Virginia Cavalry, and after a year became the regimental chaplain. Meredith also officiated at the funerals of the first parishioners to die in the war: four soldiers, two of whom died at the First Battle of Manassas (long a major road and by then a railroad ran between the cities). Meredith oversaw the training of John Bell Tilden Reed, whom Meade ordained as a deacon on March 17, 1861, and who took care of the parish's spiritual needs in Meredith's absence, with the help of visiting clergy including the Rev. Henderson Suter of Grace Church in Berryville, the Rev. Thompson B. Maury and several other Confederate chaplains. Deacon J. B. T. Reed, already a mature man and active Mason as well as son of a Methodist minister, was never ordained a priest, but at the war's end initiated young Union Major William McKinley into Winchester's Hiram Lodge of Masons, as well as himself served as a missionary in various nearby churches before his death at age 89 in 1895. The parish's wardens were both Confederate sympathizers and law partners, Philip Williams and David Barton. The former was arrested by the Union army in 1864 and imprisoned in Wheeling, West Virginia. The latter lost three of his six sons who enlisted in the Confederate cause before dying himself in 1863. The Rev. Joseph R. Jones of Cunningham Chapel was also arrested for reading a prayer for Jefferson Davis.

The Christ Church building survived the war with relatively little structural damage compared to other Winchester churches, perhaps due to the vestry's accommodations. Nonetheless, parishioners were appalled that the wardens allowed it to be used by Episcopal Union chaplains, and conducted their own services in private homes on Sundays and Wednesdays, or attended Lutheran or Presbyterian services to avoid seeing Union worshipers. Union Generals Philip H. Sheridan and George A. Custer were attended Christmas services at Christ Church in 1864. The building did suffer smashed windows, since it was used as a jail at least once (for captured Confederates, as were the Lutheran and Presbyterian churches), and perhaps as a hospital by both armies. Religious services were relatively rare. By 1864, of 96 communicants, at least 77 were women. Moreover, during the war at least 1400 soldiers who died at hospitals in town were buried in the relatively new Episcopal cemetery at Mt. Hebron (the cemetery itself starting as a Lutheran cemetery though when that church burned down in 1853 four additional denominations including Presbyterians and Episcopalians established adjacent cemeteries there).

=== Reconstruction through the Progressive Era and World Wars ===
After the war, the Rev. William Meredith resumed his duties as rector, and worked diligently to repair the parish's finances (drowning in red ink) and those of less fortunate Virginia congregations before his death on November 1, 1875. Although many of the Union dead were moved out of the Episcopal section of the Mt. Hebron cemetery by federal burial teams into the new National Cemetery at Winchester (adjacent to Mt. Hebron) or to their home towns), the Episcopal Church Women helped establish the Stomewall Cemetery section of Mt. Hebron.

Meredith also spearheaded building a lecture room for Sunday school classes (finished 1872, and the host of the diocesan council the following year). The parish's women also conducted many fundraising dinners and other drives to balance the parish books, as well as led efforts to establish a Confederate cemetery (the Stonewall Cemetery section at Mt. Hebron). Also another former Confederate chaplain, the Rev. James Avirrett (the son-in-law of vestryman Philip Williams) began a girls' school, Dunbar Seminary, in Winchester, which he ran from 1864 until accepting a transfer to the Diocese of Maryland in 1870.

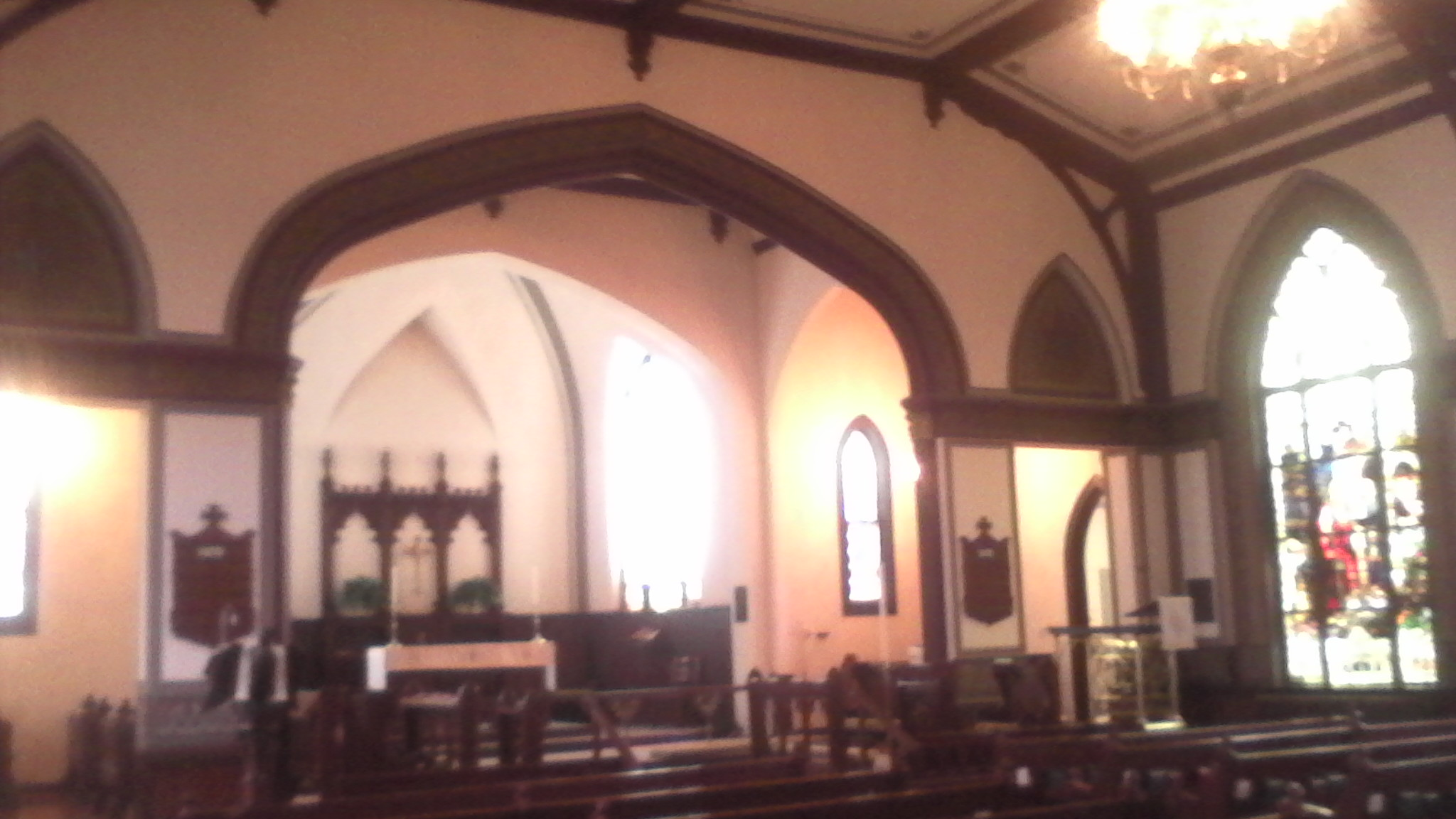

In 1874, Winchester citizens led by vestryman Frederick W.M. Holliday ("one-armed hero of the Shenandoah valley" elected Virginia's governor in 1877) established the Episcopal Female Institute (later Stuart Hall School) in Winchester, with the Rev. James C. Wheat as its principal until 1886. The school expanded under A. Magill Smith from 1895–1902, but closed in 1909, although an Episcopal girls' school of the same name run by J. E. B. Stuart's widow in Staunton continued. Christ Church parish also sent Emily Lily Funsten Ward, daughter of a local lawyer and previously active in the Daughters of the King movement, as a missionary to China in 1894, where she taught until succumbing to a fever in 1897. In 1920, the parish called the Rev. Robert A. Goodwin, a former missionary to China and of a missionary family, as rector, but his term proved short as he returned to China for a year and then like his predecessor of nearly a century earlier, became professor and dean at the Virginia Theological Seminary (although he ultimately retired in Winchester).

The Rev. Robert Burwell Nelson, a clergyman's son and from families long resident in Frederick County, served as the congregation's rector for 25 years, 1921–1946, the longest of any rector since Balmain. The parish dedicated a renovated and enlarged sacristy in Parson Nelson's memory.

== Architecture ==
The church consecrated in 1829 was a 1-story brick Gothic Revival building with a gable roof, three bays and carved stone detailing. Before the Civil War, a 3-story (48'), central tower or belfry was added.

Christ Church's windows and war damage were repaired after the Civil War. It had its next major renovation in 1882–84, under the Rev. James R. Hubbard. This included re-roofing, as well as installation of stained glass windows. Renovations inside the church were consistent with the Oxford Movement (against which Virginia's bishops Johns and Whittle continued to rail). However, Bishop Whittle was pleased to confirm 41 people on March 24, 1884, and the parish hosted the diocesan convention two months later. A side entrance was added in 1895, in addition to further repairs, and the rectory received a new porch and kitchen. The church was wired for electricity in 1906, and a parish house constructed as a memorial to a parishioner. A 1983 renovation removed a wooden organ and replaced it with a smaller modern instrument, creating a small chapel in that space.
