= Alexander Balmain =

American Episcopal minister (1740–1821)

Reverend Alexander Balmain
- Church: Episcopal
- Diocese: Virginia

Personal details
- Born: 1740 Scotland
- Died: June 10, 1821 (aged 80–81) Winchester, Virginia
- Denomination: Presbyterian-Anglican
- Education: St. Andrew's

Alexander Balmain (1740 – June 10, 1821) was an American Episcopal minister and teacher in Winchester, Virginia. He ministered Christ Episcopal Church, as well as serving as rector of Frederick Parish, for four decades, the longest of any rector in the parish. He was married to a cousin of President James Madison, whose marriage to Dolley Payne Todd he would also go on to consecrate.

Originally from Scotland, and trained as a Presbyterian, Balmain traveled to Virginia to become teacher to the children of Richard Henry Lee. He was later ordained as a minister and served under the rector of Augusta Parish at Trinity Episcopal Church in Staunton. On the eve of the American Revolutionary War, he chaired the local Committee of Safety and drafted the Augusta Resolves. During the war, he served as a chaplain under Peter Muhlenberg. After the war, he settled in Winchester where he became rector of Frederick Parish, with William Meade as his understudy.

Apart from his duties in the clergy, Balmain also helped George Washington map the most convenient route from the Potomac to the Ohio.

Balmain's ledger still exists and contains genealogical information from his time, such as marriage and funeral records.

== Early years ==
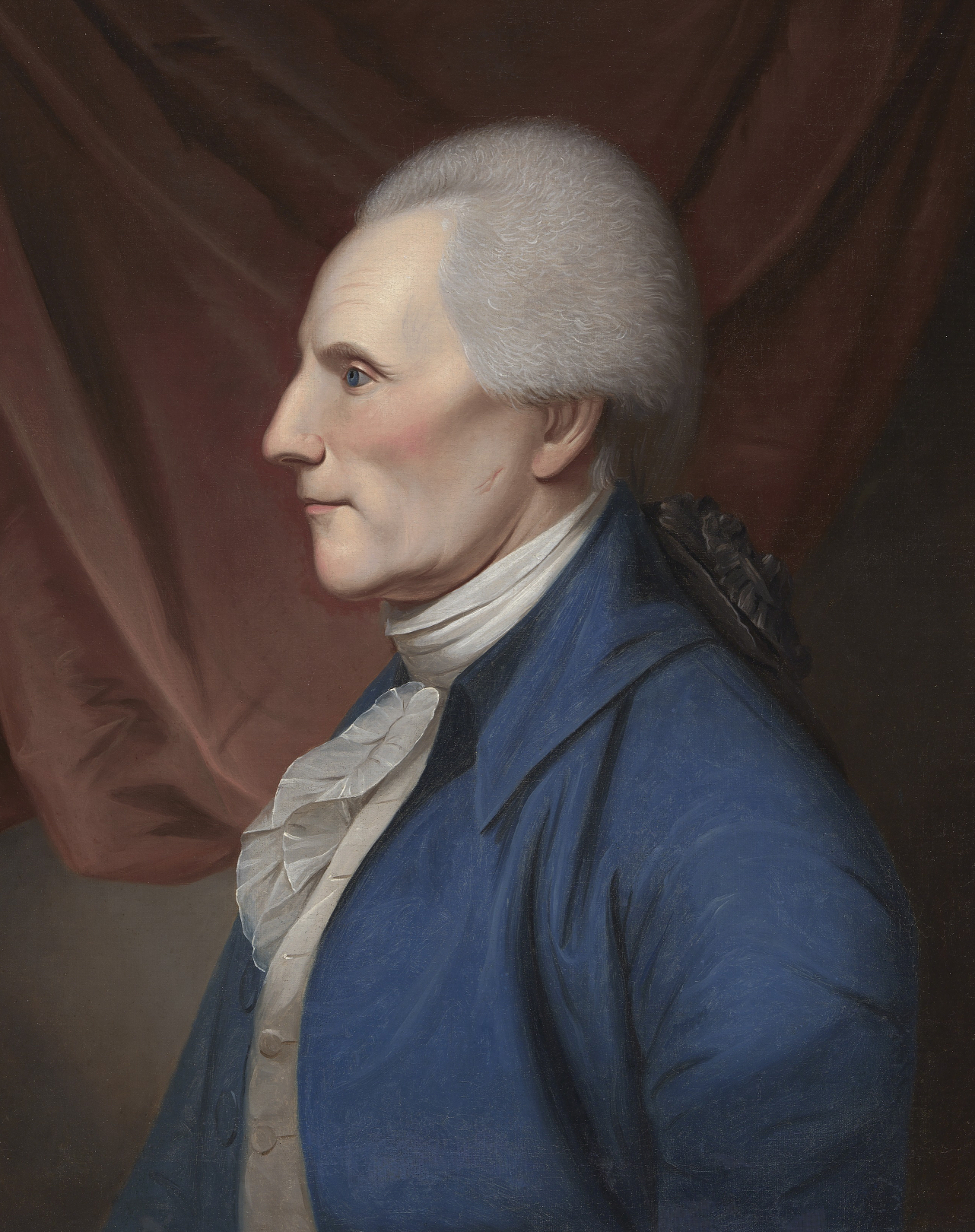
Balmain traveled to America to tutor the children of Richard Henry Lee (pictured)

Born and raised in Scotland, Balmain went on to study to be a Presbyterian minister at the University of St Andrews, receiving a Master of Arts in 1758. He also studied theology with Dr. Robert Hamilton at the University of Edinburgh.

=== Traveling to America ===
During the Stamp Act controversy in 1765, Balmain and his brother sided with the American colonists leading to difficulties, for Balmain, in obtaining employment, and as a result, he moved to London, England. There he met Arthur Lee, who recommended him as a tutor for the children of his brother, Richard Henry Lee in Westmoreland County, Virginia; Balmain accepted the position and departed for America in 1767. In 1772, after a brief return to England, he was ordained as a minister, and, in 1773, had become curate to Rev. John Jones, the "seriously incapacitated" rector of Augusta Parish in Staunton, earning 100 pounds a year.

=== American Revolution ===
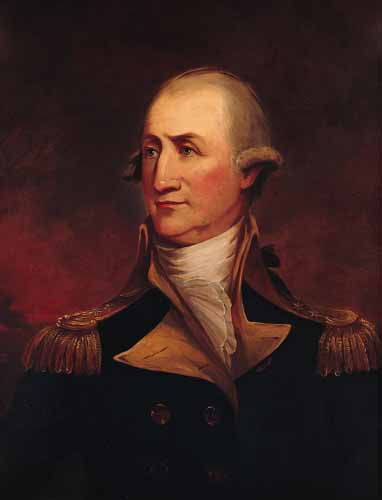
Balmain served as Peter Muhlenberg's (pictured) chaplain during the American Revolution.

On the eve of the American Revolutionary War, Balmain was chair of the Augusta County Committee of Safety. In "the first patriotic meeting of the people of Augusta County" on February 22, 1775, Balmain likely wrote the instructions to the delegates of the Colony Convention in Richmond, known as the Augusta freeholders statement or the Augusta Resolves:

"Many of us and our forefathers left our native land and explored this once savage wilderness to enjoy the free exercise of the rights of conscience and of human nature. These rights we are fully resolved, with our lives and fortunes, inviolably to preserve, nor will we surrender such inestimable blessings, the purchase of toil and danger, to any Ministry, to any Parliament, or any body of men upon earth, by whom we are not represented, and in whose decisions, therefore, we have no voice."

In June 1775, Balmain served on a diplomatic mission to negotiate with Indians at Fort Dunmore (Pittsburgh).

By 1777, he was chaplain to the 13th Virginia Regiment of the Continental Army and, on May 22, 1778, became chaplain to Gen. Muhlenberg's Brigade, serving until at least June 1780. One consequence of the revolution was that his salary no longer came from tax proceeds, but from voluntary donations given by parishioners. "This revolution, however important in its effects, has been fatal to the Clergy of Virginia." wrote Balmain to his brother in Scotland.

During the war, Balmain came into contact with James Wood, who would later become governor of Virginia. Shortly after the end of the war, on September 6, 1784, George Washington met with Balmain and noted his account of the distance from Staunton to the Sweet Springs.

== Winchester ==
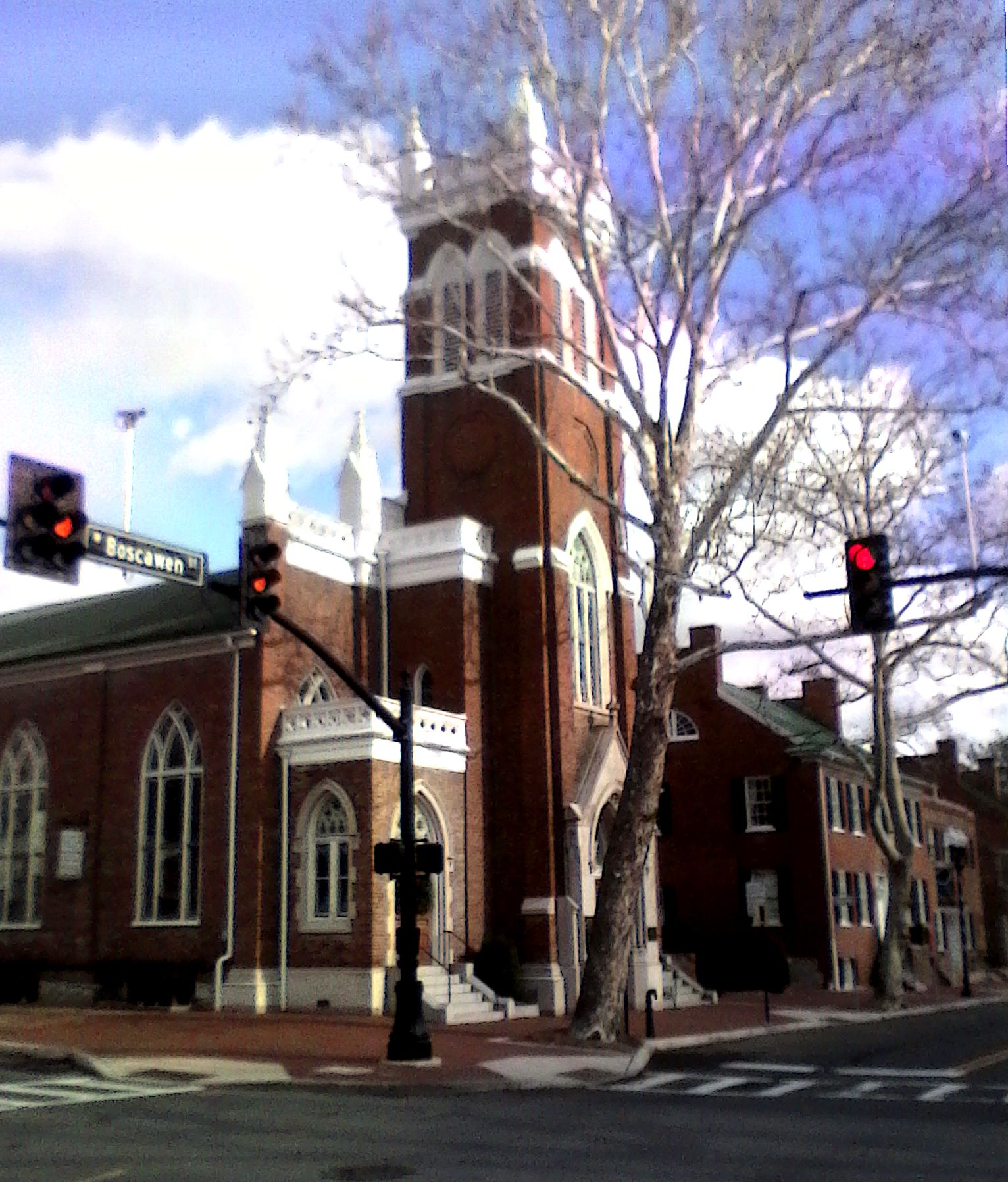
Christ Episcopal Church as it looks today.

After end of the war in 1783, Rev. Balmain settled in Winchester, Virginia, where he served Christ Episcopal Church, as its minister, and also as rector of Frederick Parish. He mentored several clergymen, including parishioner William Meade, who also become a priest and later served as rector of Cunningham Chapel Parish for 27 years as well as becoming the third Episcopal Bishop of Virginia. Balmain also attended the organizational convention of the Diocese of Virginia presided over by Rev. (later Bishop) James Madison.

The state of Virginia later disestablished the Anglican church, although it was re-established as the Episcopal Church at the post war conference but would nonetheless lose its lands. Frederick Parish was one of about a dozen parishes, including outlying ones such as Berryville, to survive disestablishment relatively intact.

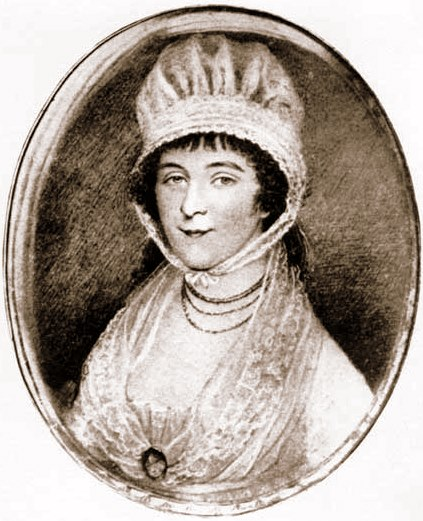
Balmain married James and Dolley Madison (pictured).

Balmain lived a frugal life as his primary source of income was a meager military pension for his service during the war supplemented by subscriptions from his parishioners and rent from leases of the glebe lands, which were generally donated to the poor. Apart from his religious duties, Balmain also taught, and performed marriages, notably the marriage of James and Dolley Madison at Harewood on September 15, 1794.

An unusual exercise of his faith was Balmain's attempt to exorcise the Wizard Clip ghost of Middleway.

=== Family ===
According to one account, Balmain came to Winchester "in debt and in love". In 1786, he married Lucy Taylor (1757–1841), a relative of future presidents James Madison and Zachary Taylor, from Orange County.

Alexander Balmain Bruce was a relative by marriage. Balmain's sister Margaret married George Bruce. Balmain convinced his nephew John Bruce to immigrate from Scotland. Vestryman Bruce also established the Winchester Academy and helped bring a railroad to Winchester before his death in 1855. John's son was the artist Edward Calledon Bruce.

=== Death and legacy ===
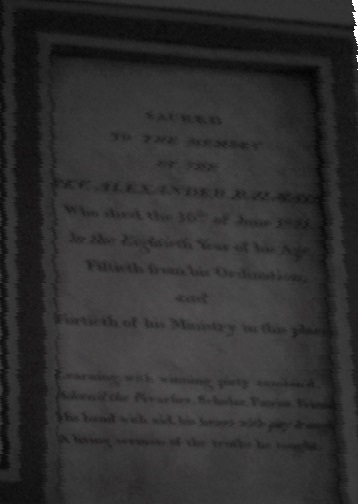
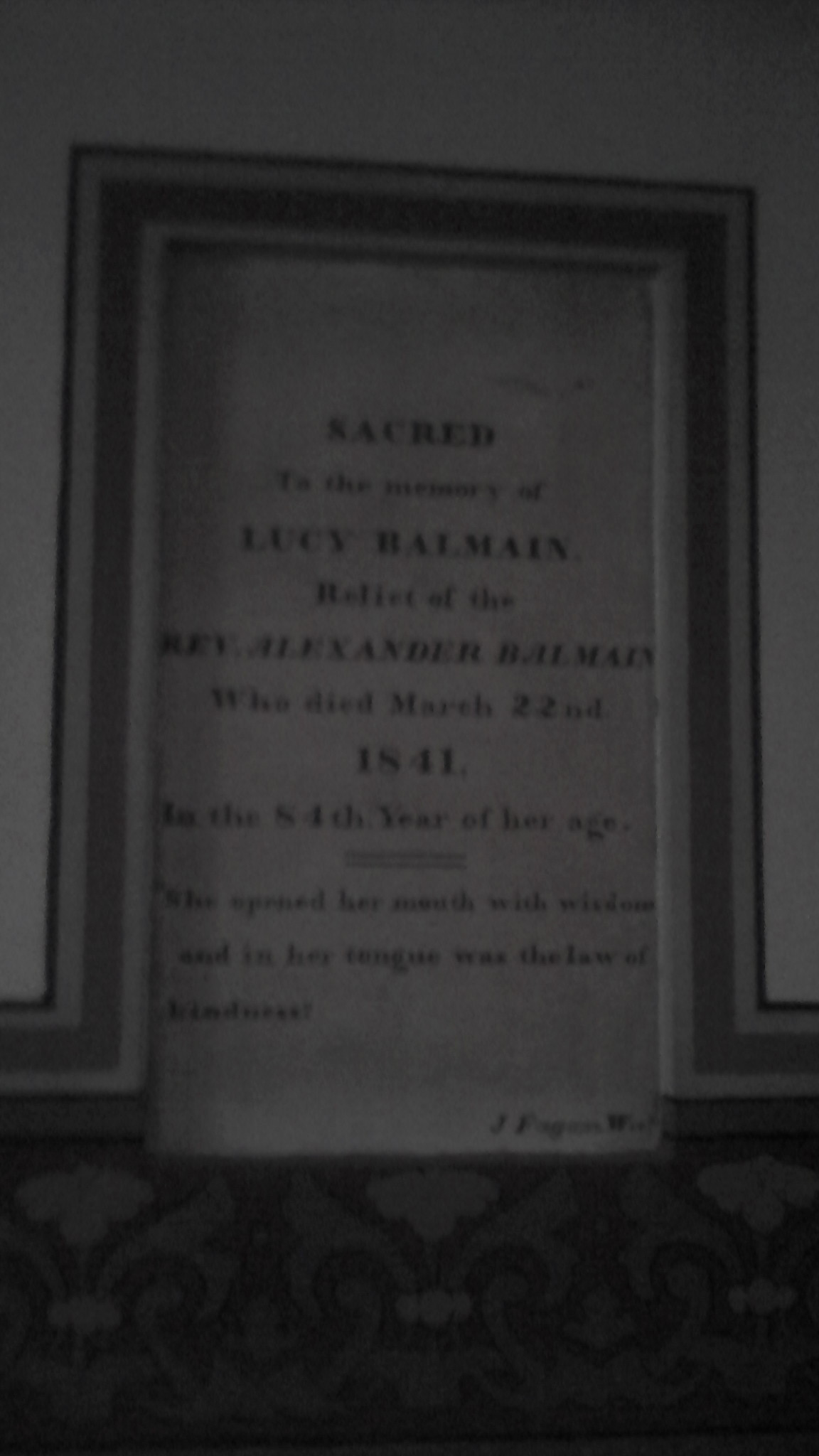
Balmain and wife's tombstone, in the wall of the church.

Balmain served Frederick Parish for over four decades, the longest of any rector to date, until his much-mourned death in 1821. One of Rev. Balmain's last acts was to help form the Episcopal Society of the Valley, a missionary society for the Shenandoah Valley, in 1820.

Rev. Balmain, like his protege Bishop Meade, was highly active in the American Colonization Society. Balmain's last will and testament gave his wife Lucy the power to emancipate their slaves, whom Meade remembered them treating as their children, during her life or as part of her last will.

He was buried in the cemetery of the old stone church. When the present brick church was built in 1828, the headstones were installed in the west wall of the nave, where they remain.

Balmain kept a large manuscript journal, which still survives, providing much information about the life of a rector in that period. It includes personal and household accounts, those who subscribed to his salary from 1787 to 1797, paid mostly in wood, wool, and beef, the marriages and funerals he conducted, a list of his books, information about his Revolutionary land warrants, prayers, and copied newspaper articles from the politics of the day.
