= Meade Memorial Episcopal Church =

Episcopal Church in Virginia, U.S.

Coordinates: 38.8085°N 77.0488°W

Meade Memorial Episcopal Church, 2022

Meade Memorial Episcopal Church is a predominantly Black Episcopal Church in Old Town Alexandria, Virginia. Founded in 1870, the church today is supported by a congregation that includes descendants of the original founders of this parish. Meade Memorial belongs to the Episcopal Diocese of Virginia, whose members continue to serve the community and the Episcopal Church by participating in regional and Diocesan activities.

The church building itself was moved in 1873 from the northern edge of Alexandria to the more centrally located Black neighborhood of Uptown. (Note: For more on the historic Black neighborhoods of Alexandria, see Courageous Journey, page 15ff.) At this time it was designated a "colored Episcopal chapel".

== History ==
=== Establishment of mission church ===
Meade Chapel was originally established in 1870 as an outreach mission of Christ Church Alexandria, ministering to new migrants to the town following the dislocations of the Civil War. The initial site of the chapel was on the NE corner of Montgomery and Columbus Streets, on a parcel which the church had negotiated with the Alexandria Canal, Railroad and Barge Company. This location was easily accessible for parishioners, both Black and White, who were settling on the northern edge of the town. A chapel large enough to seat 150 worshippers and more was constructed on the site, and regular services at the chapel were led by White seminarians from Virginia Theological Seminary under the supervision of the rector of Christ Church.

As part of its mission, Meade Chapel established and ran a "colored Sunday School" under the direction of John J. Lloyd. This school was part of a movement across the South to provide education to Black children and adults by religious and benevolent societies. The laws of Virginia had prohibited the education of Blacks for the 30 years before the Civil War, and there was a tremendous pent-up demand by African-Americans for learning at all levels. A bell, cast in 1871, called parishioners to worship and also served as the school bell for the neighborhood Black children who attended the day school at the chapel. This same bell still hangs in front of Meade Memorial Episcopal Church on Alfred St.

=== Meade becomes Black Church ===
It was through his contacts at the school that Mr. Lloyd was able to report to the Christ Church Vestry in 1872 that "quite a number of colored persons had expressed a desire that [Christ Church Vestry] would furnish a suitable place to be used as an Episcopal Church for colored persons". It was this expressed wish for self-segregation by members of the Black community that led to the Vestry resolution that "Meade Chapel be placed at their disposal for one year, provided the signatures of not less than fifty persons of the age of sixteen years and over can be obtained, promising to make that their regular place of worship, and provided further that they will pay for the fuel &c". Within 6 months the required signatures had been gathered, and on April 16, 1873, the Alexandria Gazette was able to report, "Meade Chapel, in which it is proposed that the colored Episcopalians shall worship, will remain under the control of the rector and trustees of Christ Church." (Note: Meade Chapel was one of 10 Black churches founded in Alexandria following the Civil War to support freed African Americans as they formed new communities and associations. These include Zion Baptist, 1864; Shiloh Baptist, around 1863; Third Baptist Church, 1865; Meade Memorial, 1869; Ebenezer Baptist, 1881; Good Shepard Episcopal Chapel, 1883; Mt. Jezreel, 1890; and Oakland Baptist, 1891.)

In the same year, 1873, the Christ Church Vestry resolved to move the actual building from the north edge of town further south on Columbus St. A lot was donated on the corner of Princess and Columbus Streets as a new site for the existing Chapel building; this would make it more accessible to the residents of the Black neighborhood of Uptown. It was not uncommon to move existing buildings to new locations as the town expanded; however, moving this building, a wooden hall which could hold 150 people and more, south down Columbus St. was an ambitious project. The Gazette reported on April 23, 1873, that the "building known as Meade Chapel was put on rollers yesterday, [and] moved into Columbus street" under the supervision of the contractor Mr. B. F. Price. The move did not go without problems. Neighbors of the proposed new site complained, and the progression of the building down Columbus St. was halted. Within a week the complaints concerning the new location of this "colored Episcopal chapel" had been resolved, and the contractor continued with the relocation. While the White parishioners of the northend chapel moved their worship to Christ Church, the first service at Meade Chapel (colored), now situated in its new location on the corner of Columbus and Princess Streets, was held on 18 May 1876.

=== Pastoral care ===
For the next three years John J. Lloyd, who had presented the original request of Black Episcopalians to the Christ Church Vestry, remained active and supportive of the Meade community. Schooling remained a priority for children in the Black Uptown neighborhood. The Sunday School enrolled between 50 and 90 children during these early years. Under Lloyd's direction, a "parish [day] school for colored children" was also established, with an enrollment of about 100 young scholars.

Services at Meade Chapel were led for the most part by White seminary students from the segregated Virginia Theological Seminary under the supervision of the rector of Christ Church. In 1876 the first Black minister, the Rev. John H. M. Pollard, was hired for Meade Chapel. While Pollard only stayed at Meade for a few years, it was the beginning of an influential career for this Black Episcopalian priest, who went on to become an archdeacon in North Carolina. Following Rev. Pollard's departure in 1881, the charge of Meade returned to the care of the White seminarians at VTS. They could now also draw from the new African-American Bishop Payne Divinity School, established in Petersburg, Virginia, in 1878, to bring in Black seminarians and deacons to minister at Meade.

The Rev. William P. Burke was one of the first of the Bishop Payne graduates who came to Meade Chapel in November 1889 as a deacon. Within months, in February 1890, the Rev. Burke was ordained as a priest in the Episcopal Church, and as such was able to celebrate the Eucharist in his parish. Now that Meade was able to support a priest of its own, the parish applied to the Christ Church Vestry to leave their mission status under the care of Christ Church, and become an independent parish church in the diocese of Virginia. With this, the parish was committing to be financially self-supporting and was also able to select its own clergy; in May 1890 Meade Chapel became officially Meade Memorial Church. When the Rev. Burke left in 1892, the parish reverted to mission status, pastored by seminarians. In 1907 the Rev. Joseph F. Mitchell began his ministry at Meade and remained there for 11 years.

By this time the condition of the actual Meade worship hall raised concern; originally built in 1870, the wooden structure was showing its age. It was decided that the ‘dilapidated’ building needed to be replaced, and a building fund was started by the Episcopal churches in Alexandria and Washington, DC. to raise the $10,000 needed for a new church building. In 1911 the site on Princess and Columbus was sold, and a larger property a few blocks up in the Uptown neighborhood was purchased. The following year construction on the new building was started, and in February 1913 the congregation was able to celebrate with Rev. Mitchell in their new brick chapel on Princess and Alfred St.

=== Move to Alfred Street ===
The new Meade Memorial Church on Alfred Street was a simple one-room chapel without a rectory, parish hall, or organ, but it served its established African-American congregation well. On cold Sundays parishioners would come in early to stoke the coal furnace and warm the church for services. This building, situated in the middle of the Uptown neighborhood, became a meeting place both spiritually and as a center for Black social, political and economic movements during the decades of segregation in the early 20th century.

== Church and community ==
This original brick chapel still stands, now part of a larger church complex which has grown over the last century. Through fundraising in the early 1950s a new parish hall was completed in 1956. The sanctuary of 1911 was modernized; the altar was moved to the north wall, and the dark mahogony paneling and pews were replaced with a lighter pine interior. A playground was constructed in the churchyard, and the new parish hall included a second story with offices and classrooms.

The investment in the physical plant has matched the continued investment of the Meade community in the social and spiritual investment in their parish and neighborhood. Starting in 1871 with their very first "colored Sunday School", then growing into a parish day school for the Black children of Uptown, the parish has continued to make itself an integral and relevant presence in the segregated African-American community of Alexandria of the 20th century, including programs in children's ministry, community service, adult education, and missions.

Rev. John T. Walker pastored at Meade Memorial in the early days of his career; he went on to become the first ordained Black bishop of the Episcopal Diocese of Washington DC. During the racial upheavals of the 1960s, the activist pastor Rev. Davis encouraged the young people at Meade to lend their own voice to the changes that African Americans were pushing for.

The church remains a parish which translates its faith into direct action and community service. They continue to make their mark in the Uptown neighborhood with their annual Jazz Concerts and a weekday preschool housed in their building. In 2022 the new landscaping of the Chelsea Washington Memorial Garden continues to beautify this historic church building.
