= Old Chapel (Millwood, Virginia) =

Historic site in Clarke County, Virginia

- U.S. National Register of Historic Places
- U.S. Historic district – Contributing property
- Virginia Landmarks Register
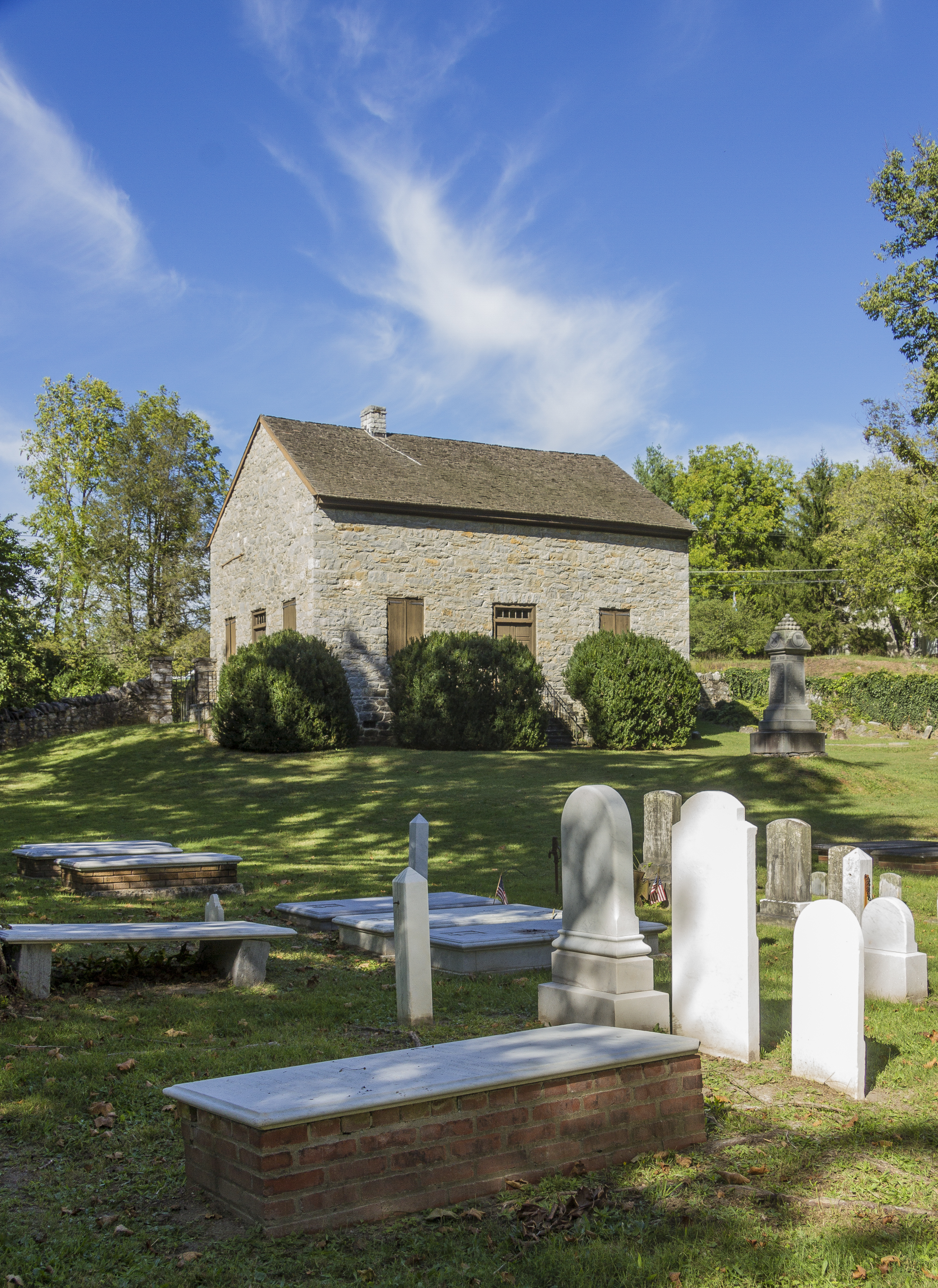
- Old Chapel, September 2012

- Location within Northern Virginia Location within Virginia Location within the United States
- Location: 3 mi. N of Millwood off U.S. 340, Millwood, Virginia
- Coordinates: 39°6′24″N 78°0′54″W
- Area: 9.9 acres (4.0 ha)
- Built: 1793
- NRHP reference No.: 73002004
- VLR No.: 021-0058

Significant dates
- Added to NRHP: April 2, 1973
- Designated VLR: November 21, 1972

Old Chapel is a historic Episcopal church building located near Millwood, Clarke County, Virginia. Old Chapel is now the oldest Episcopal church building still in use west of the Blue Ridge Mountains. It was listed on the National Register of Historic Places in 1973. In 2014, the Chapel Rural Historic District was recognized, and which encompasses both Cunningham parish churches, discussed below, as well as approximately 700 other structures and an area of nearly 10,500 acres.

== History ==
In the 18th century it was known as Cunningham's Chapel for the tavern located nearby at the location of two historic roads—the Old Dutch Wagon Road westward from Alexandria to Frederick Town (Winchester), Virginia and the Ohio River Valley (what in the Federal period became the National Road now route 340) and the shorter east-west highway from Burwell's mill in Millwood (now numbered 255).

The original log church authorized by the Virginia General Assembly (when it created the large Frederick Parish with several auxiliary chapels of ease) in 1738 was built some time between 1740 and 1750 (the slow building process led to accusations of malfeasance and litigation before the General Court in Williamsburg). It was reroofed and renovated in 1762, but destroyed during the American Revolutionary War.

The current building was authorized in 1790 and completed circa 1793. It was the home parish of Bishop William Meade, who for a time served under Frederick Parish's longtime rector, Rev. Alexander Balmain (of Scotland and later Winchester, Virginia). Meade served as the priest in charge here for 25 years (and effectively moved the parish's headquarters here upon Rev. Balmain's death), although he secured construction of Christ Church in Millwood (as discussed below) around the time of his consecration as assistant bishop of Virginia, and a successor was soon hired for the parish. As a plaque inside relates, Bishop Meade expected to be buried here, but he died in Richmond, Virginia, and was initially buried at the Hollywood, and his remains later moved to the cemetery of Virginia Theological Seminary in Alexandria.

Also on the Old Chapel property is a contributing cemetery, originally on land donated by the Burwell family. It holds the grave of founding father (and former Virginia governor and U.S. Attorney General) Edmund Randolph, as well as many members of the Burwell, Nelson and Randolph families. Like the later Meade Memorial Church cemetery (discussed below), it also has a memorial to Confederate war dead.

== Related churches ==
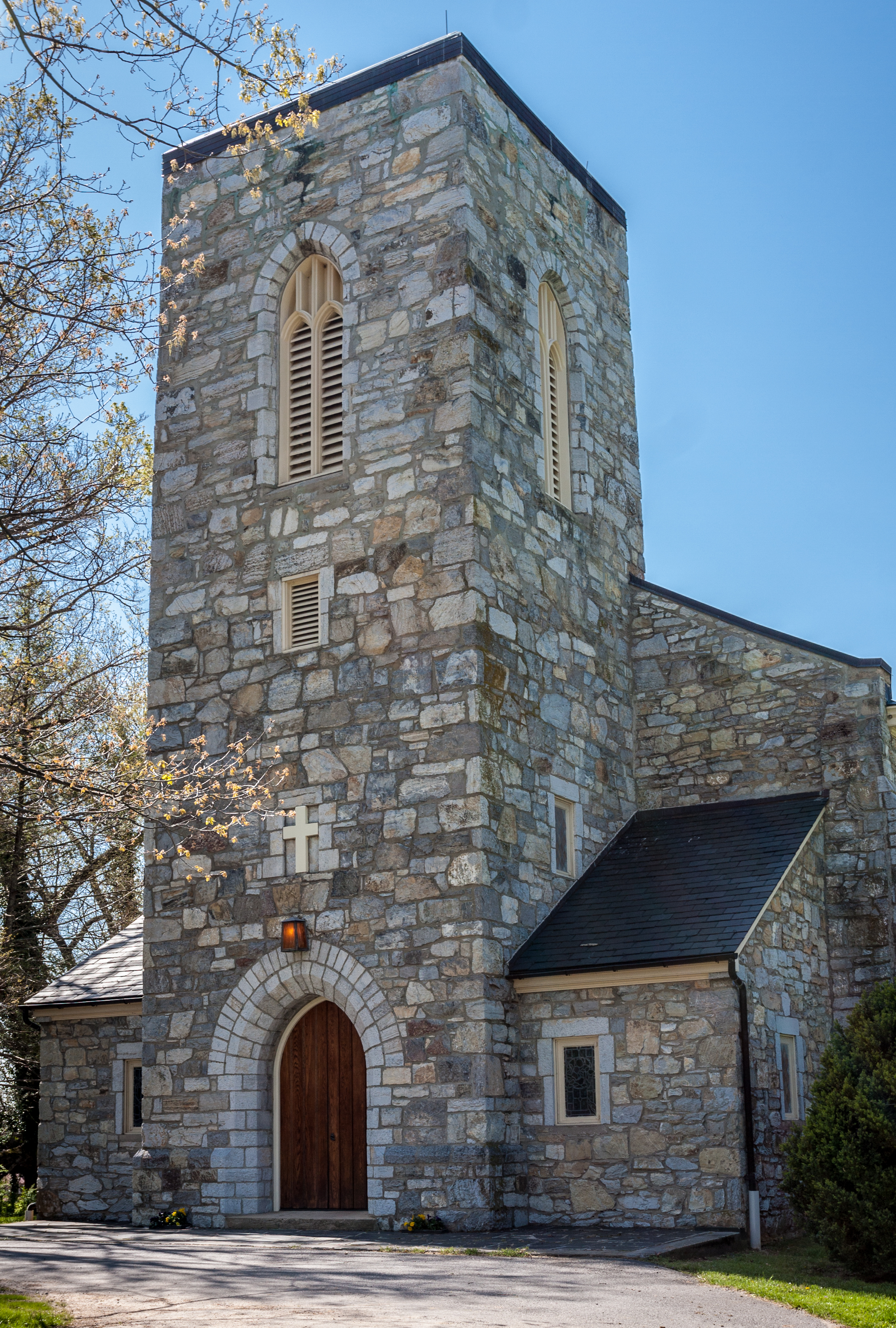
Christ Church, Millwood

In 1816, population growth (and the donation of land by a local family) led to construction of a wooden chapel of ease about ten miles away at the intersection of the road to Alexandria with the road to Greenway Court, the estate of Lord Fairfax, who initially worshipped here or at what became Christ Episcopal Church (Winchester, Virginia). That chapel was rebuilt as Wickliffe Church in 1853, during the area's era of greatest prosperity, and is itself a historic site.

The parish nonetheless kept growing, and by 1826 this building was too small to serve its needs. In 1832 Christ Church, Millwood was consecrated about three miles away down what became known as Bishop Meade Road (VA255) (formal address is 809 Bishop Meade Road, Millwood VA 22646). The new chapel (finished in 1834) was nearer Bishop Meade's home, across the street from (Carter Hall) (the home of the prominent Burwell family which had donated the land), and nearer the mill, school and post office. Clarke County also formally separated from Frederick County in 1836, with the redrawn parish remaining in Clarke County (although not formally named Cunningham Chapel Parish until 1868).

On March 29, 1853, the vestry voted to hold at least two services per year at the Old Chapel, once in the spring and once in the fall. It was also used for services by the local African American community. This church is still used for a sunrise service on Easter Sunday and on the second Sunday in September.

Christ Church Millwood was rebuilt in Gothic Style in 1892 and again in 1947 after a severe fire. Its rectory became the Parish Hall, and the vestry remains responsible for both properties. In 1912, the parish began building another gothic structure about four miles away, near the Boyce railroad station. That structure, a contributing building to the Boyce Historic District as are the Methodist Church also built in 1916 and Baptist Church built in 1910, was deconsecrated in 2012 and is now being redeveloped.

In 1872, Rev. Joseph Ravenscroft Jones, rector of Cunningham Parish since 1858, laid the cornerstone for Meade Memorial Church in White Post, close to the deceased bishop's home. That church was consecrated in 1875 and remained in use despite a declining congregation until 1967, when it was closed for nearly three decades. However, the area again grew in population, so the church was reopened in 1996 and remains an active (although small) congregation today.

== Architecture ==
The current historic stone church has a single story, three bay by three bay design, and a shingle covered gable roof. The spare interior has a carved wooden pulpit and balcony accessible by a steep stairway. It also has a memorial plaque for Bishop Meade, as well as several post-Civil War caretakers.

== Notable burials ==
- Colonel Nathaniel Burwell of Carter Hall (1750–1814)
- John Esten Cooke
- Ann Randolph Meade Page (1781–1838)
- Governor Edmund Randolph (1753–1813)
- Robert Cooke Goolrick (1948-2022, American writer)
