= Stuart House (Staunton, Virginia) =

Historic house in Virginia, United States

- U.S. National Register of Historic Places
- U.S. Historic district – Contributing property
- Virginia Landmarks Register
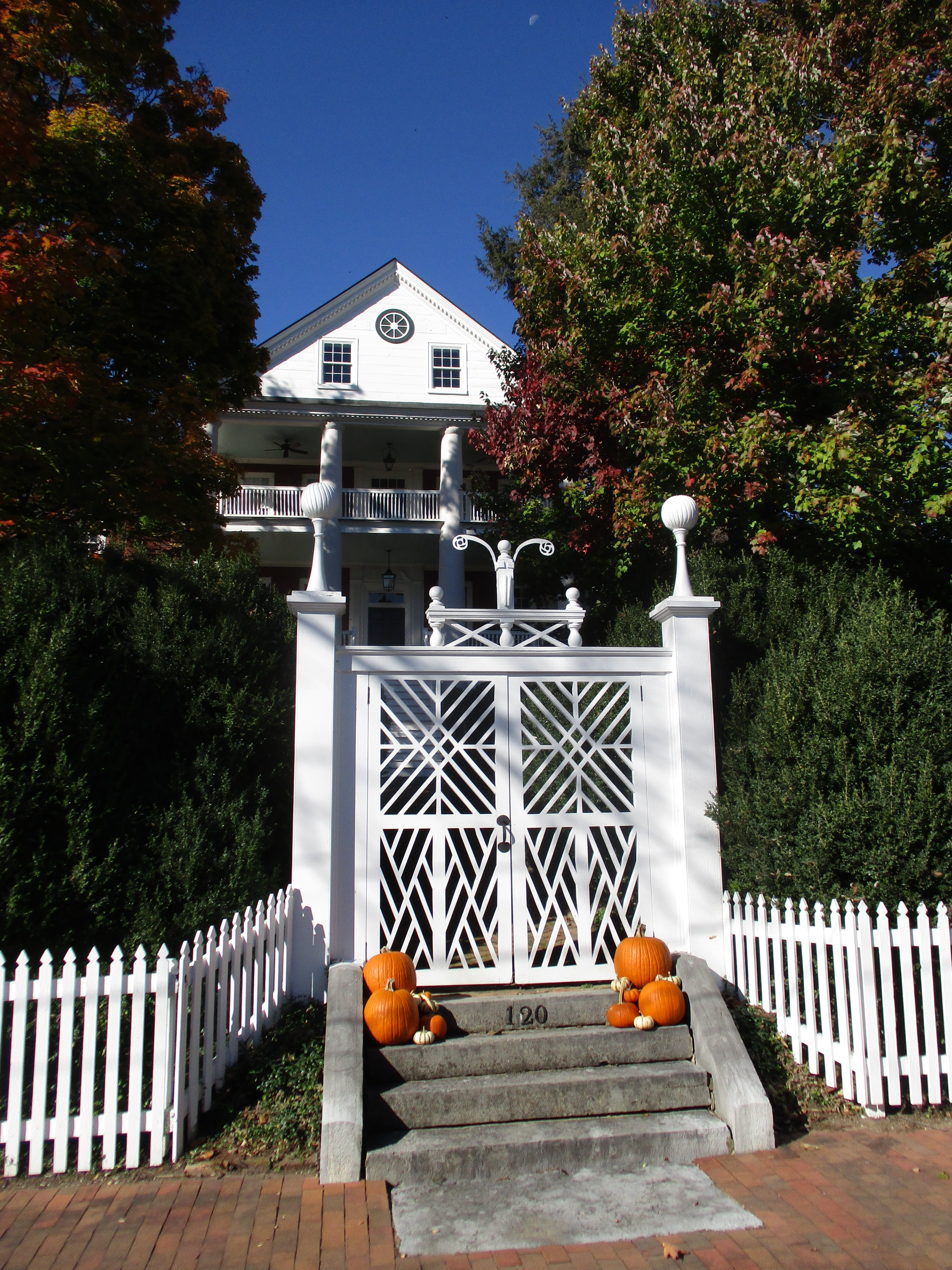
- Stuart House in October 2024

- Location within Virginia Location within the United States
- Location: 120 Church St., Staunton, Virginia
- Coordinates: 38°8′50″N 79°4′33″W
- Area: 9.9 acres (4.0 ha)
- Built: 1783, 1791, 1844
- Built by: Stuart, Archibald
- Architectural style: Classical Revival
- NRHP reference No.: 72001531
- VLR No.: 132-0006

Significant dates
- Added to NRHP: May 5, 1972
- Designated VLR: January 18, 1972

Stuart House is a historic home located at Staunton, Virginia. The original portion of the house was built in 1791, and is a two-story, temple-form brick structure fronted by a two-level pedimented portico supported by four very simple and provincial Tuscan order-like columns. The house is five bays wide and three bays deep. The house has a large 2 1/2-story brick wing added in 1844. The wing is fronted by a gallery ornamented with lattice-work and supported on brick piers. Also on the property is a gambrel roof frame building, erected sometime after 1783 as Archibald Stuart's residence and law office, and a pyramidal roof smokehouse. According to family tradition, Stuart received plans or suggestions for the house's design from his close friend, Thomas Jefferson. Archibald Stuart died in 1832 and the house was inherited by his son, Alexander Hugh Holmes Stuart (1807-1891).

It was added to the National Register of Historic Places in 1972. It is located in the Newtown Historic District.
