= Wickliffe Church =

Historic church in Virginia, US

- U.S. National Register of Historic Places
- U.S. Historic district – Contributing property
- Virginia Landmarks Register
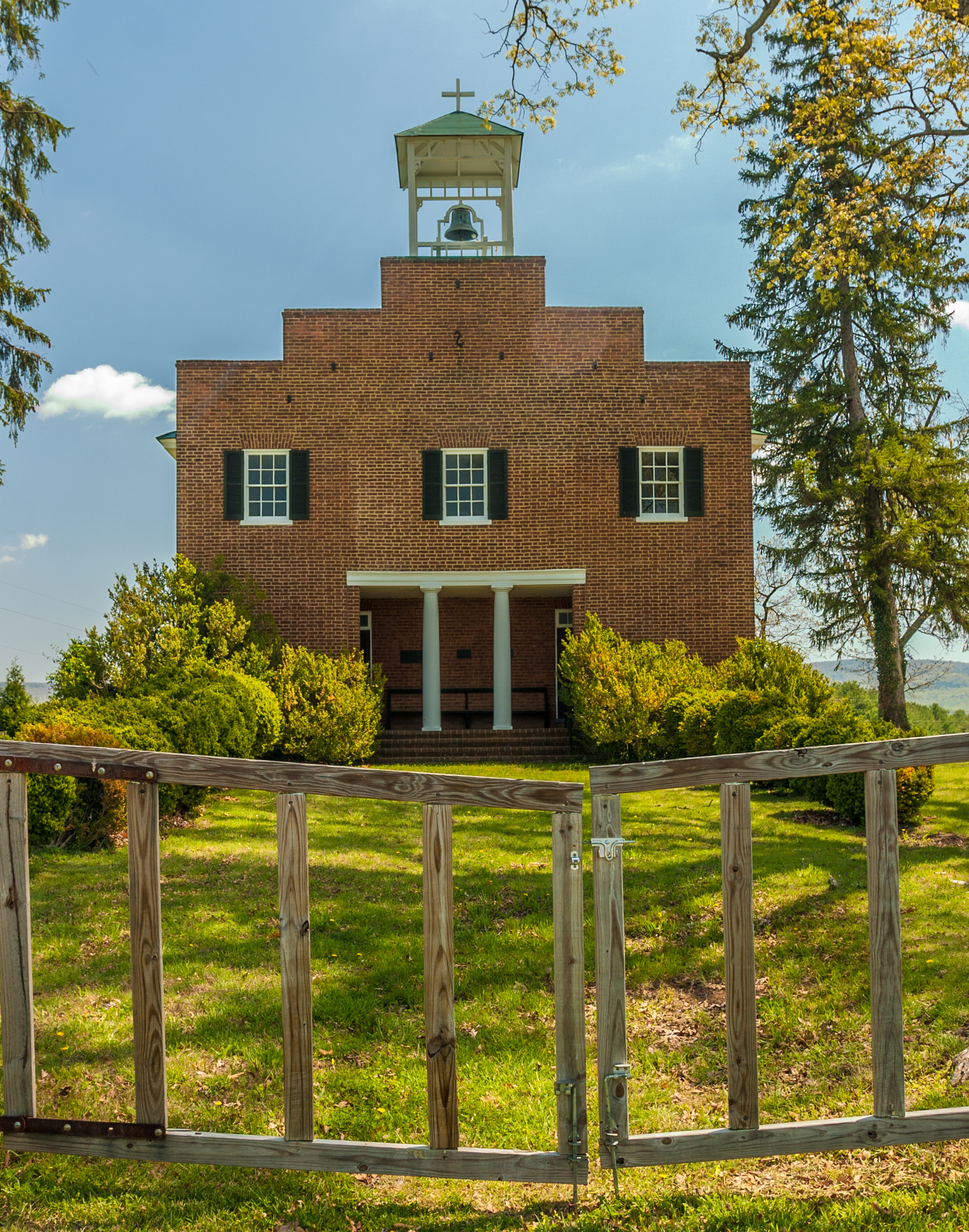
- Wickliffe Church, April 2013

- Location within Northern Virginia Location within Virginia Location within the United States
- Location: VA 608, E side, .5 mi. S of VA-WV line, Berryville, Virginia
- Coordinates: 39°9′57″N 77°53′31″W
- Area: 2 acres (0.81 ha)
- Built: 1846
- Architectural style: Greek Revival
- NRHP reference No.: 95000241
- VLR No.: 021-0089

Significant dates
- Added to NRHP: March 17, 1995
- Designated VLR: January 15, 1995

Wickliffe Church is a historic Episcopal church building located in Berryville, Clarke County, Virginia. The church has not been in active use since 1918, except for an annual homecoming service held in August and occasional special events.

== History ==
This brick church was built in 1846 to replace an earlier stone church built between 1817 and 1819, when Episcopalian families in the area found travel over bad roads to Old Chapel (Millwood, Virginia) or Christ Episcopal Church (Winchester, Virginia) too difficult. Its name honors John Wycliffe, who first translated the Bible into English. Rev. William Meade, who lived in what became Clark parish, served all three of those churches until about 1821, when he arranged for assistants to handle Wickliffe and Morgan Chapel in Bunker Hill, West Virginia, as well as Christ Church in Winchester and Old Chapel during his evangelistic travels throughout Virginia (which then included West Virginia) and nearby states. Meade became an assistant bishop in 1829 and Bishop of Virginia in 1841, but continued to make his home in Clarke County and travel extensively.

The Episcopal Diocese of Virginia authorized creation of Wickliffe parish in 1834, two years before the Virginia General Assembly split Clarke County from Frederick County and Berryville became the new county's seat. The current main church in the parish, Grace Episcopal Church (Berryville, Virginia), about nine miles away, was founded a dozen years after Wickliffe. It became a parish in its own right in 1853, during perhaps the area's time of greatest economic prosperity, with young Rev. Francis McNeece Whittle (a future bishop of Virginia) as the first rector in Berryville and Rev. William McGuire at Wickliffe. Meade considered the earlier stone church poorly constructed, and it had become dangerous by 1845, so it was torn down and the present brick structure built. A school, Wycliffe Academy, operated on the property from 1828 until 1852, and 1865–1867.

The Cool Spring/Snicker's Ferry area nearby was the site of a battle on July 17–18, 1864, that was the most extensive engagement in Clarke County during the American Civil War. It marked the end of a campaign against Washington D.C. led by Confederate General Jubal Early and proved the reason for appointment of Union General Philip Sheridan to command government forces in the area as the Valley Campaigns of 1864 continued (and Union forces captured Winchester for the third and final time on September 19). Immediately before their victory in the Battle of Cool Spring, Confederate infantry commanded by Major General Robert E. Rodes camped on the church grounds.

After the war, this congregation became known for its evangelism, founding additional mission churches nearby, including St. Mary's in Berryville and Church of the Good Shepherd at Snicker's Gap (Bluemont, Virginia), as well as St. John's Church in Rippon, West Virginia in the 1870s and Christ Church also in Jefferson County, West Virginia. In 1905, Hannah Williams donated funds to construct a school to educate African Americans. That building was later moved to Berryville and is now the parish hall of St. Mary's Episcopal Church

In 1918 due to a declining congregation (and the advent of automobile transportation), the congregation merged with Grace Episcopal Church in Berryville, which preserves the old church (which is available for weddings and other events) and holds an annual homecoming in mid-August.

== Architecture ==
The two-story, brick church achieved Virginia and National Landmark status in 1995 as a nearly pristine example of the Greek Revival style. Wickliffe Church features a distinctive distyle-in-antis portico with Doric order columns providing access to two entrance doors which open into the nave. Additional doors on either side provide access to stairways which ascend to the gallery. The church also features stepped gables and an open belfry. Wickliffe Church retains a high degree of integrity, having never been updated with electricity, plumbing, or other modern alterations.

Also on the property is a contributing cemetery with the remains of members of the Williams family, donors of the land on which the church was built.

It was listed on the National Register of Historic Places in 1995. Later that year, Virginia began the historic recognition process for the Cool Spring Battlefield historic district The district was included in the National Register in 1997, but revised in 2014 to eliminate a building constructed circa 1880 and an archeological site that had been disturbed during road construction and did not relate to the Civil War period.
