= William Meade =

American Episcopal bishop (1789–1862)

The Right Reverend William Meade D.D.
- Bishop of Virginia
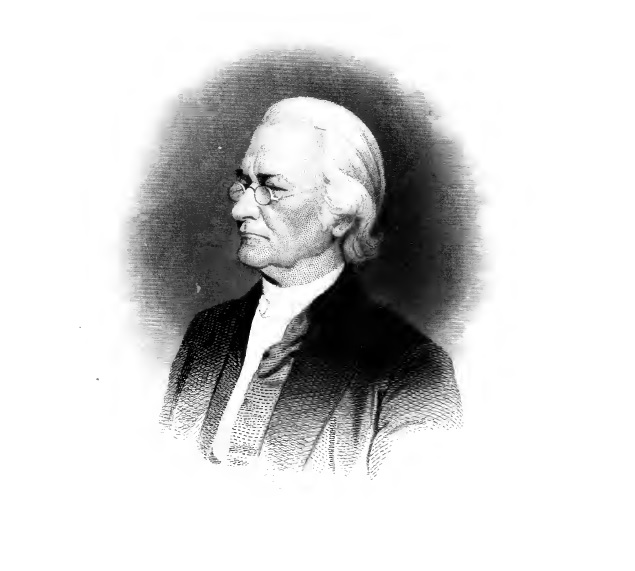
- Church: Episcopal Church
- Diocese: Virginia
- In office: 1841–1862
- Predecessor: Richard Channing Moore
- Successor: John Johns
- Previous post: Assistant Bishop of Virginia (1829–1841)

Orders
- Ordination: January 29, 1814 by Thomas John Claggett
- Consecration: August 19, 1829 by William White

Personal details
- Born: November 11, 1789 White Post, Virginia, United States
- Died: March 14, 1862 (aged 72) Richmond, Virginia, United States
- Buried: Virginia Theological Seminary, Alexandria, Virginia
- Denomination: Anglican
- Parents: Richard Meade; Mary

William Meade (November 11, 1789 – March 14, 1862) was an American Episcopal bishop, the third Bishop of Virginia.

== Early life ==
His father, Colonel Richard Kidder Meade (1746–1805), one of George Washington's aides during the American Revolutionary War, after the conflict ended sold his estate at Coggins Point on the James River near Henricus and bought 1000 acres and moved the family to the Shenandoah Valley. Thus, William Meade was born on November 11, 1789, at 'Meadea' in White Post, then grew up at Lucky Hit plantation, originally in Frederick County but now located in Clarke County, Virginia. Both homes are listed on the National Register of Historic Places.

Meade was home-schooled until he was ten, then sent to a school run by Rev. Wiley on the estate of Nathaniel Burwell. Rather than attend the College of William and Mary in Virginia, which some considered irreligious by the time, young Meade and his fellow student William H. Fitzhugh entered the college of New Jersey (later Princeton University) in 1806. Meade graduated with high honors and as valedictorian in 1808.

At the urging of his mother and his cousin Mrs. Custis, Meade studied theology privately under the Rev. Walter Addison near the newly established national capital, and lived for a time in Alexandria, Virginia, across the Potomac River from Rev. Addison's parish. He was particularly impressed by Soame Jenyns Internal Evidence of Christianity and William Wilberforce's Practical View. Meade also returned to Princeton in 1809 to continue some graduate studies in divinity (since it had been organized by the Presbyterian Church), but caught a near-fatal fever, and so returned home to work on the farm as well as to build his own Shenandoah valley home at Mountain View (an estate which remains today, although no longer in Meade family ownership).

== Family ==
Since this Meade later published genealogies of Virginia families, and in one pamphlet distinguished the Episcopal Church from the "Romish," he acknowledged the first of his ancestors to arrive in America was Andrew Meade, a Roman Catholic who emigrated to New York and married Quaker Mary Latham of Flushing. The couple moved to what was then Nansemond County, Virginia, where great-grandfather Meade "abjured his allegiance to the Roman Church," became a vestryman of the Suffolk Church, and briefly represented the county in the House of Burgesses (the forerunner to the Virginia General Assembly, in which his grandson David and great-grandson Andrew would also serve). His son David married a daughter of North Carolina's last proprietary Governor, Sir Richard Everard, 4th Baronet, who could trace descent from Richard Kidder, Bishop of Bath and Wells. One of their sons, Richard Kidder Meade (born 1746), married Jane Randolph, daughter of Richard Randolph of Curles, whom the family noted was a descendant of Pocahontas as well as grandfather of John Randolph of Roanoke. However, they had no children before Jane died. After the Revolutionary war, in 1780, Col. R.K. Meade married again, to Mary Randolph, the daughter of Benjamin Grymes and widow of William Randolph of Chatsworth, who bore him four daughters and four sons, including the future bishop.

Young William Meade married Mary, daughter of his Frederick County neighbor and lay reader Philip Nelson, on January 31, 1810. They had three sons before she died on July 3, 1817, and was buried at Old Chapel, as later would their sons Philip Nelson Meade (1811–1873) and Francis Burwell Meade (1815–1886). Three years after her death, on December 16, 1820, William Meade remarried, to Thomasia, daughter of Thomas Nelson of Yorktown and Hanover, who zealously assisted him in his ministry for two decades before dying on May 20, 1836. She was buried at Fork Church in Hanover County. Bishop Meade's middle son, Richard Kidder Meade (1812–1892) became a clergyman, as did five of his grandsons.

== Ministry ==
The elderly bishop James Madison of Virginia ordained Meade as a deacon on February 24, 1811. Meade afterward recalled that the congregation consisted of fifteen gentlemen and three ladies, almost all of them his relatives, and that on the way to Bruton Church many more gun-toting students and hunting dogs had passed them. When Meade traveled back through Richmond, the newly ordained deacon noted that the city's only church St. John's was only open for communion occasions, and that the Episcopalian Dr. Buchanan and Presbyterian Dr. Blair alternated Sundays. Bishop Madison died about a year later, and at least two men declined offers to become his successor.

After the disestablishment of the Anglican Church in Virginia in 1786 was found legal by Virginia's highest court in 1803, the new Episcopal Church, which had over 180 priests at the start of the Revolutionary War, was desperately short of ministers. By 1811, with Bishop Madison very infirm, no one from Virginia attended the General Convention. The following year Meade and several other prominent Virginians convinced William Holland Wilmer of Chestertown, Maryland, to move to Alexandria and the new national capital to serve as rector at St. Paul's Church after the newly ordained deacon Meade tried to serve those parishioners' needs as well as those of Alexandria's older parish for several months despite their significant distance down the Lord Fairfax Highway from his family's preferred home.

Only seven Virginia priests (including Meade and Wilmer) gathered for the second diocesan convocation to select Madison's successor, many fewer than the priests and laity (led by Carter Braxton) who had gathered in 1805 and declined their Bishop Madison's request to appoint an assistant for him (with rights of succession). Finally, Meade, Wilmer and several other prominent Episcopalians convinced Richard Channing Moore to move to Richmond, Virginia, to become rector of Monumental Church (a significant parish then being built as a memorial to those who died in a disastrous theater fire), and Moore in due course became bishop Madison's successor. Bishop Thomas John Claggett ordained Meade as a priest in 1814.

From his ordination until 1821, deacon and then Rev. Meade served as the assistant to Rev. Alexander Balmain, rector of Frederick Parish and who usually served in Winchester, Virginia, about 15 miles away from Meade's home. Meade normally officiated every other Sunday at the Old Chapel near his family's plantations. On the alternate Sundays, his father in law served as the parish's lay leader, while Rev. Meade visited other congregations nearby or more remotely. After Rev. Balmaine died, Meade took on assistants who served at Winchester and Wickliffe, until those parishes were separated from Frederick Parish. Meade also remained as rector after his consecration as assistant bishop as discussed below, in part because his predecessors all kept other positions.

Meade also continued manual labor on his farm, and had specifically sought assurances from Bishop Madison before ordination that such work would not violate a longstanding church canon against servile labor, for Meade firmly believed sloth had helped all but destroy the Church of Virginia. He also home-taught his sons and nephew, both in scholarly work and manual labor. Later, Meade became known for his forays throughout Virginia, especially by horse even during severe weather, preaching among diverse parishes, until he ceded to old age and used a carriage (which some joked dated from his father's service with General Washington).

In 1818, Meade and Wilmer helped organize an education society in Alexandria. Five years later, after an unsuccessful attempt to establish a seminary in Williamsburg, both helped form the Virginia Theological Seminary in Alexandria to train young men for the ministry in Maryland, Virginia and southern states. Meade also supported the American Tract Society, and the Bible Society, except as the former grew to support abolitionism, as discussed below. Later, from 1842 to 1862, bishop Meade served as the seminary's president, as well as delivered an annual course of lectures on pastoral theology. Meade also helped found the Evangelical Knowledge Society (1847) and served as its president. That organization opposed what it considered the heterodoxy of many of the books published by the Sunday School Union, and attempted to displace them by issuing works of a more evangelical type.

== Episcopate ==
In 1829, after Wilmer's unexpected death and as Bishop Moore approached retirement, Meade became assistant Bishop of the Episcopal Diocese of Virginia. Three years earlier, he had refused suggestions that he apply to become the now-elderly Bishop William White's assistant in the Episcopal Diocese of Pennsylvania. Nonetheless, Bishop White led several other bishops who gathered at St. James' Church in Philadelphia during Meade's consecration as Bishop Moore's assistant.

The new suffragan's first official act, on October 30, 1829, was consecrating a new building for Christ Church in Winchester. Meade then began an extensive visitation of the diocese, which took him to Martinsburg, then through the Shenandoah valley (Woodstock, Harrisonburg, and Staunton) before conducting Christmas services in Halifax and returning north to Alexandria. In 1832, Meade traveled across the Appalachian mountains for visitations in Kentucky and Tennessee. He also served as rector of Christ Church, Norfolk in 1834–1836, which may have prompted Meade to resign as rector of his home Cunningham Chapel parish (Rev. Stringfellow succeeded him for five years, followed by several longer-serving rectors). Rt. Rev. Meade thus became the first Virginia bishop to hold his position full-time, without concurrent responsibilities for an individual parish (as had bishop Moore with Monumental Church) or institution (as had bishop Madison with the College of William and Mary). In 1841, Meade traveled to London and met the future archbishop of Canterbury J.B. Sumner, among others.

When Bishop Moore died later that year, Meade succeeded him as Bishop of Virginia, and soon consecrated Maryland native John Johns as his assistant (and successor more than two decades later). Whereas the diocese had 44 clergy serving 40 parishes and 1,1462 communicants when Meade was consecrated as suffragan, the numbers had risen to 87 clergy serving 99 parishes and 3,702 communicants by the year Bishop Moore died, and 116 clergy serving 123 parishes and 7,876 communicants by 1860.

A low Churchman, Meade believed in evangelism and missionary work. He preached the gospel of Christ Crucified like some of his Presbyterian neighbors. Unlike his neighboring bishops Whittingham of Maryland and Ravenscroft and Ives of North Carolina, Meade opposed the Oxford Movement as too "Romish" (particularly after Rt.Rev. Ives' conversion to Catholicism in 1855). Rt.Rev. Meade especially objected to doctrines of transubstantiation and prayers for the dead, which he thought inconsistent with salvation through grace. As bishop Meade actively participated in several episcopal disciplinary cases against high churchmen: against Bishop Henry Onderdonk (1789–1858) of Pennsylvania (who because of intemperance was forced to resign and temporarily suspended from the ministry) in 1844; against his younger brother Bishop Benjamin Treadwell Onderdonk (1791–1861) of New York, who in 1845 was suspended from the ministry on the charge of improper conduct; and against Bishop George Washington Doane of New Jersey for misappropriation. Meade also disciplined at least one priest in Portsmouth for practices he believed excessive and akin to Catholicism.

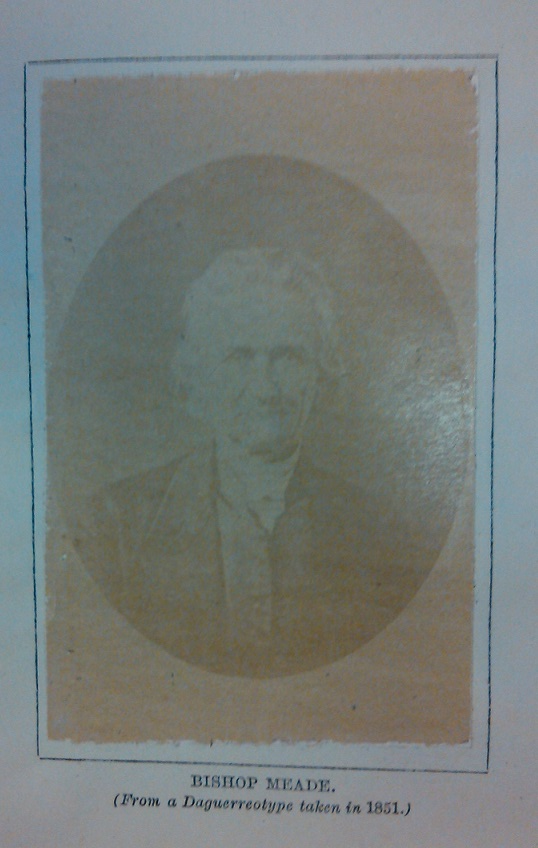

In 1851, some Virginians in counties north and west of Meade's familial home wanted to secede from Virginia, politically as well as by selecting their own bishop. Bishop Meade pointed out that the section only had seven clergy, far less than the 30 required under church canons, and the proposal was defeated until after Meade's death.

== Views on slavery ==
Meade freed his own slaves, who moved to Pennsylvania, since Virginia's laws at the time forbade emancipated slaves from remaining in the Commonwealth without special permission from the legislature. His views were influenced by his sister Ann Randolph Meade Page (died 1838) as well as his clerical mentors (who both freed slaves). On December 21, 1816, Rev. Meade traveled to Washington, D.C., for the organizational meeting of the American Colonization Society (ACS), thus helping Rev. Robert Finley (a Presbyterian), Francis Scott Key and U.S. Supreme Court clerk Elias B. Caldwell (son of the "fighting chaplain of the third New Jersey regiment") establish that organization. In 1819, Virginia's diocesan convention strongly supported the ACS, and Meade (as ACS's agent) traveled through the American south campaigning for the removal of African American slaves to Africa. In Georgia he purchased slaves illegally brought into the state and sold publicly at Milledgeville.

However, Meade did not consider slavery a sin, merely a hindrance to economic growth. He believed Christian principles could teach masters to treat their slaves well. Thus, in 1813 Meade compiled and published a compilation of Christian proslavery tracts by authors including Anglican minister Thomas Bacon and Baptist Edmund Botsford. After his consecration, one of Meade's earliest pastoral letters (in 1834) concerned religious instruction for slaves.

Beginning in 1833, Bishop Meade, Judge William Leigh of Halifax and lawyer Francis Scott Key administered the will of their friend John Randolph of Roanoke, who died without children and who in his final testament directed his executors to free his more than four hundred slaves. The executors fought for a decade through Virginia courts to enforce the will and provide the freed slaves land to support themselves.

In 1841 Meade reported for a diocesan committee concerning the best means for instructing slaves, urging clergyman to devote at least part of each Sunday's sermon at slaves, or hold Sunday afternoon or weeknight services for them, and that if they could not catechize both white and black children, reserve those limited resources for slave children. Meade repeated the educational theme through his addresses and parochial reports, and in 1856 was criticized by an anonymous correspondent for remarks concerning slavery "in the presence of ten or twelve Negroes, who were candidates for confirmation."

Meade convinced himself of the reciprocal nature of the master-slave relationship, and by 1857 published Christian proslavery tracts in his own name, declaring in his historical masterwork "If the evil passions are sometimes called into exercise, the milder virtues are much more frequently drawn forth." In 1858, his suffragan John Johns took charge of the committee and emphasized missionary work among slaves. Johns later summarized Meade's position as disliking slavery and considering it politically disadvantageous to the country, but relying on his own experience concerning manumission's failures. As Meade grew older, perhaps influenced by slave rebellions in Virginia, or his family's business interests, his views concerning slavery became more conservative. Biographer Johns stated that bishop Meade wrote to an American Tract Society meeting in New York opposing "an attempt ... made to introduce the leaven of New England fanaticism" and that Meade was unable to attend such meeting, but failed to mention the year the Tract Society's directors then defeated the abolitionist resolution.

Meade's last will and testament contains no explicit bequests of slaves, although it does direct (among other bequests) his executor to spend $200 to purchase tracts from the Evangelical Knowledge Society, the American Tract Society and the American Sunday School Union to be distributed among descendants of his brothers R.K. Meade and David Meade, as well as $500 to (ACS missionary) Rev. Charles Wesley Andrews "to be expended in the manner directed in a paper or papers accompanying this will", as well as refers to two farms (Mountain View previously purchased by his son Philip Nelson Meade but who had not received a deed, and the adjacent Browers Farm and land in Missouri given to his three sons jointly with the expectation of sale and division between them).

== Confederate bishop ==
Meade fought against Virginians who threatened secession after the election of President Abraham Lincoln, preaching at Millwood against the looming civil war on June 13, nearly two months after Virginia's secession. Still, Meade believed in state's rights and acquiesced in his beloved Commonwealth's ultimate decision to secede. Although near retirement (John Johns having become his suffragan decades earlier), Meade became a leading figure in the Protestant Episcopal Church in the Confederate States of America. In 1859, shortly after John Brown's raid on Harpers Ferry (not very far down the historic Shenandoah Valley road from Meade's familial home and farm), the Episcopal Church held its General Convention in Richmond. There, the elderly Rt. Rev. Meade helped other southern bishops consecrate Henry Champlin Lay as a missionary bishop of the Southwest. Two years later, Bishop Meade as the senior seceding bishop, led the convention in Columbia, South Carolina in October 1861, which drew up the incorporation documents. However, he did not travel to Montgomery, Alabama for the preliminary organizational meeting July 3–6, 1861. Thus, Bishop Stephen Elliott of Georgia became the Presiding Bishop of the Confederate Episcopal Church.

On March 6, 1862, the elderly and infirm bishop returned to Richmond for the last time in order to assist his suffragan and Bishop Elliott in consecrating Wilmer's son, Richard Hooker Wilmer, as bishop of Alabama at St. Paul's Church. Bishop Meade had traveled by train from Gordonsville, along with his son, the Rev. Richard K. Meade, although coughing and obviously ill. He arrived at the church in time for the consecration, but afterward was confined to bed at a friend's home, and died days later. According to tradition, the dying Virginia bishop gave his last blessing to Confederate General Robert E. Lee, whom he had long known from the days both had lived and worshiped in Alexandria, and who was married to the daughter of his sister Ann Page's best friend. Bishop Meade was reputedly the only man who customarily called the general by his first name.

== Death and legacy ==
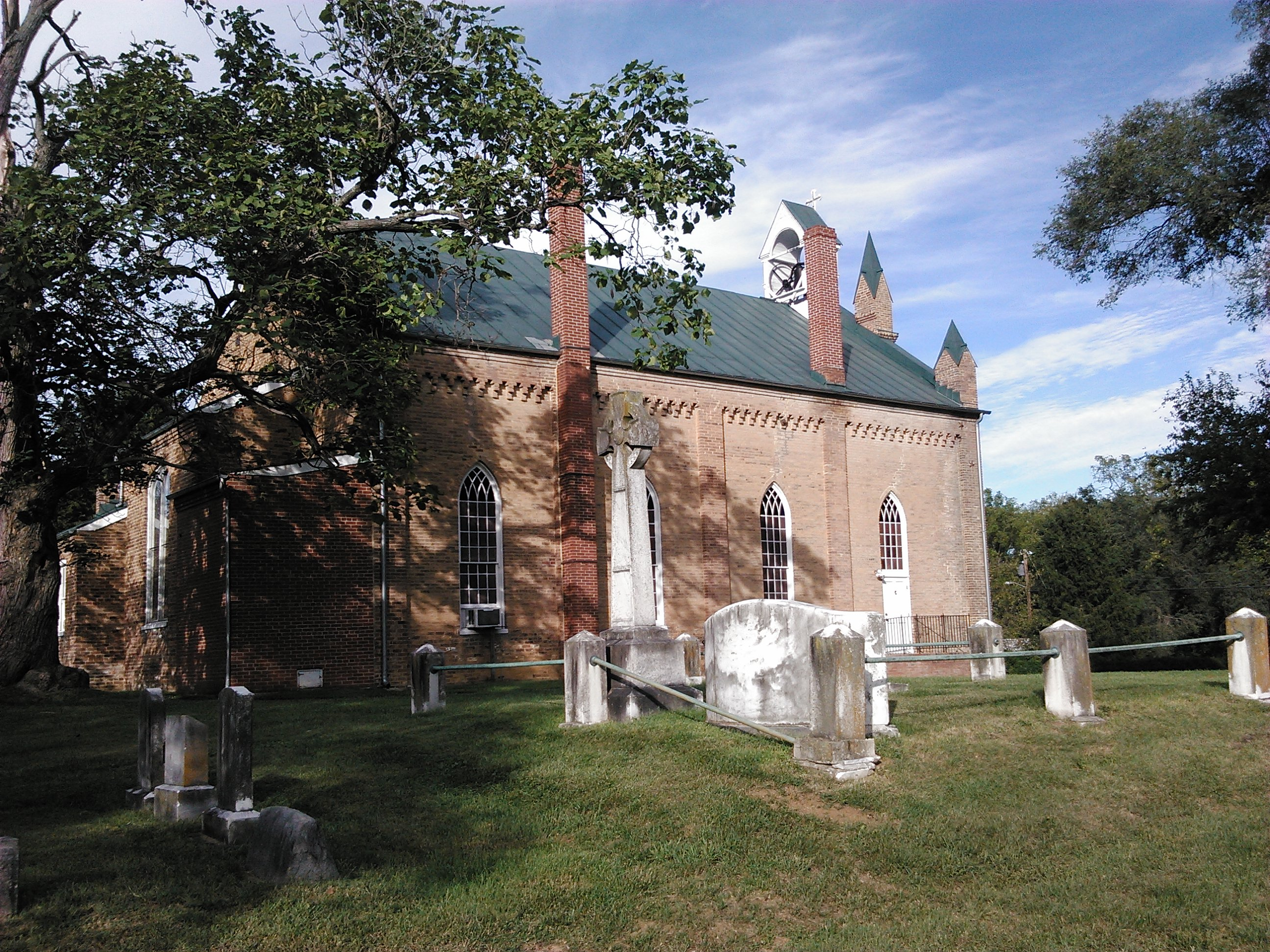
Meade Memorial Church in White Post

Bishop Meade died in Richmond, Virginia, aged 72, on March 14, 1862. After a funeral at St. Paul's Church in Richmond, his body was placed in a vault in Hollywood Cemetery. The monument and remains were later moved to the Virginia Theological Seminary in Alexandria.

Not long after Meade's death, the counties adjacent to his home counties of Frederick and Clarke seceded from Virginia and became the state of West Virginia. The General Convention organized the Episcopal Diocese of West Virginia in 1877. Its first bishop, George William Peterkin, was a VTS graduate who had served with Meade's son in the Confederate army, and whose vocation Bishop Meade had fostered. Furthermore, Peterkin's long-serving successor at Baltimore's Memorial Church, Dr. William Meade Dame had been named in the bishop's honor.

In 1868, Virginia's diocesan council authorized a church near the Meade family's estates in White Post, which was begun in 1872 under the direction of Rev. John Ravenscroft Jones (rector of Meade's home Cunninham Chapel Parish as well as disciplined for his Confederate sympathies by occupying Union forces) and consecrated in 1875. Although inactive for a time, it now again has an active congregation, as well as graveyard which contains many Meade family graves and a Confederate memorial. Furthermore, in 1869, the rector of Christ Church in Alexandria, Randolph Harrison McKim (a Confederate veteran), organized a mission church for African American Episcopalians in the city where Meade had long served. In 1870, Bishop Johns consecrated that church in honor of his mentor, Meade Memorial Episcopal Church in Alexandria. Initially serviced by Rev. McKim and various VTS seminarians, it remains an active congregation.

== Publications ==
Among his publications, besides many sermons, were:

- Sermons Address to Masters and Servants, and Published in the Year 1743, by the Rev. Thomas Bacon, Minister of the Protestant Episcopal Church in Maryland, Now Republished with other Tracts and Dialogues on the Same Subject, and Recommended to all Masters and Mistresses to Be Used in Their Families (Winchester, VA: John Heiskell, 1813)
- A Brief Review of the Episcopal Church in Virginia (1845)
- Conversations on the Catechism of the Protestant Episcopal Church, abridged and Accommodated to the American Church from an English Edition (1849)
- Wilberforce, Cranmer, Jewell and the Prayer Book on the Incarnation (1850)
- Reasons for Loving the Episcopal Church (1852)
- Old Churches, Ministers and Families of Virginia (1857), a storehouse in two volumes of material on the ecclesiastical history of the state, republished several times.
- The Bible and the Classics (1861)

== See also ==
- Tractarianism

Episcopal Church (USA) titles
| Preceded by Richard Channing Moore | 3rd Bishop of Virginia; 1841–1862 | Succeeded by John Johns |
