= Newtown Historic District (Staunton, Virginia) =

Historic district in Virginia, United States

- U.S. National Register of Historic Places
- U.S. Historic district
- Virginia Landmarks Register
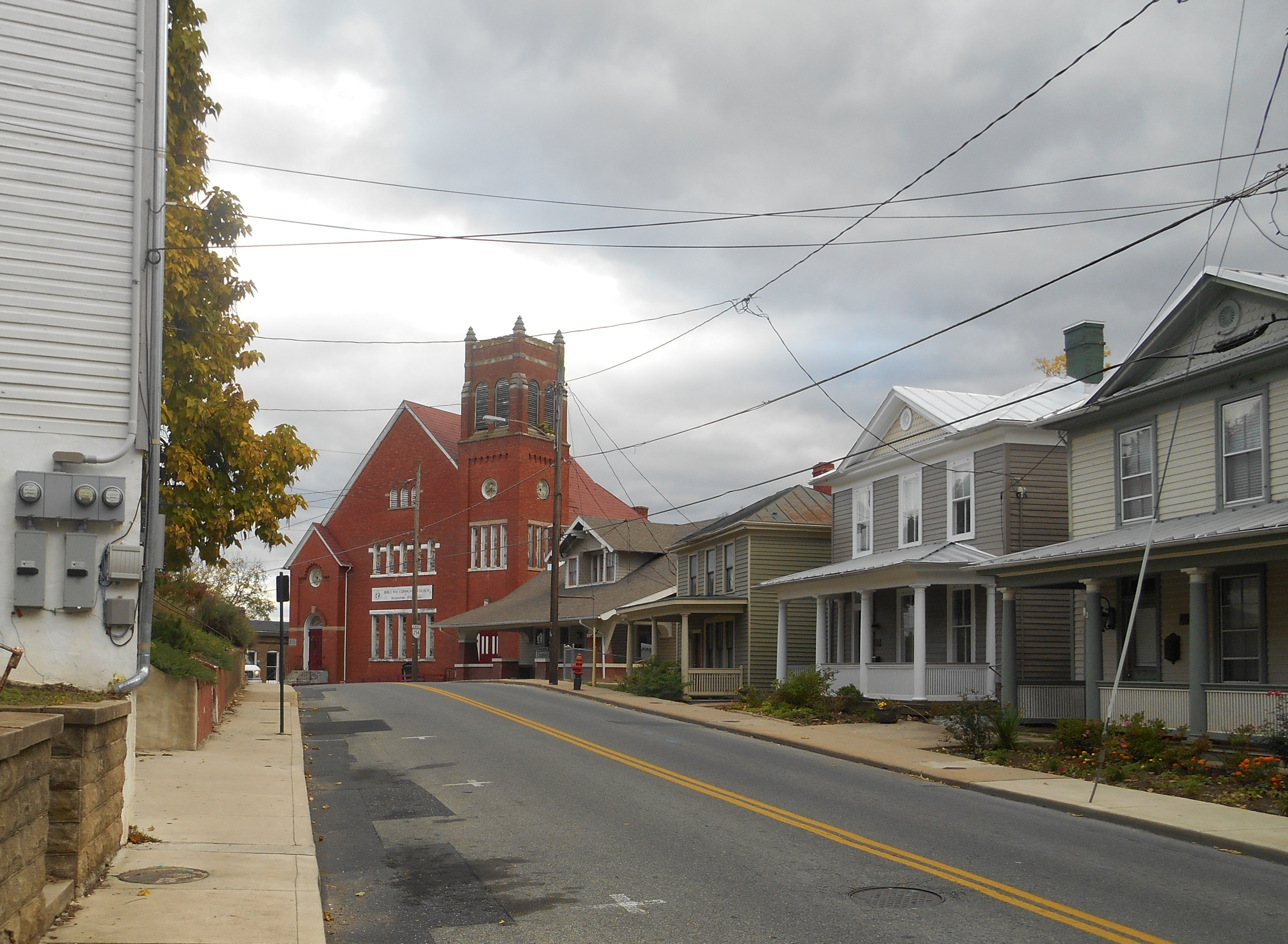
- W. Beverley St., looking eastward

- Location within Virginia Location within the United States
- Location: Roughly bounded by Lewis St. and S. Jefferson Sts., C&O RR, Allegheny and Churchville Aves., incl. Thornrose cemetery, Staunton, Virginia
- Coordinates: 38°9′3″N 79°4′46″W
- Area: 161 acres (65 ha)
- Architectural style: Mid 19th Century Revival, Late Victorian, Neo-Classical
- NRHP reference No.: 83003318
- VLR No.: 132-0034

Significant dates
- Added to NRHP: September 8, 1983
- Designated VLR: June 21, 1983

Newtown Historic District is a national historic district located at Staunton, Virginia. The district encompasses 414 contributing buildings and 2 contributing sites in a primarily residential section of Staunton. The district includes some late 18th- and early 19th-century structures, but most of the homes were built between 1870 and 1920 during Staunton's boom years. The buildings range from Jeffersonian Neo-Classical and Greek Revival to bungalows of the 1920s. Notable buildings include Stuart Hall's Cochran House (1858), Robertson House (1886), the Smith Thompson House (c. 1792), and the George M. Cochran House (1851, c. 1915). The magnificent grounds of Thornrose Cemetery are also included in the district. Located in the district are the separately listed Stuart Hall School, Stuart House, and Trinity Episcopal Church.

It was added to the National Register of Historic Places in 1983.
