= Stuart Hall School =

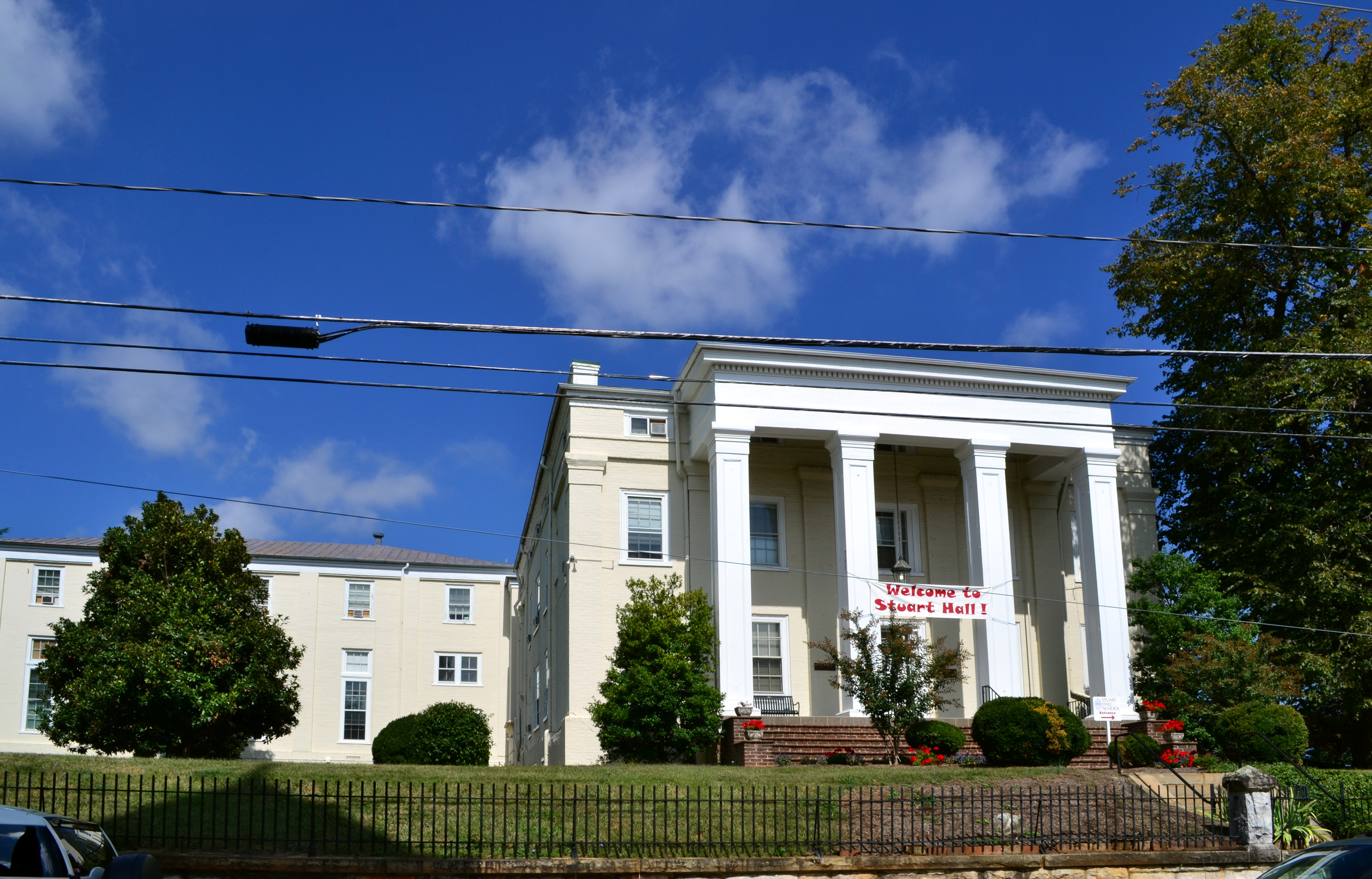

Location
- 235 W. Frederick St. Staunton, Virginia 24401; United States

Information
- Type: Independent Secondary, Boarding
- Established: 1844; 182 years ago
- Head of school: Jason Coady
- Grades: 6–12
- Average class size: 15
- Campus: Urban, 8 Acres
- Colors: Red & White
- Nickname: Dragons, Stu
- Accreditation: Virginia Association of Independent Schools
- Affiliation: National Association of Independent Schools
- Website: Stuart Hall School
- Old Main
- U.S. National Register of Historic Places
- U.S. Historic district – Contributing property
- Virginia Landmarks Register
- Location within Virginia Location within the United States
- Location: 235 W. Frederick St., Staunton, Virginia
- Coordinates: 38°9′1″N 79°4′36″W
- Area: less than one acre
- Built: 1865
- Architectural style: Greek Revival
- Part of: Newtown Historic District (ID83003318)
- NRHP reference No.: 74002246
- VLR No.: 132-0011

Significant dates
- Added to NRHP: August 13, 1974
- Designated CP: September 8, 1983
- Designated VLR: February 21, 1974

Stuart Hall School is a Staunton, Virginia, co-educational school for students from Grade 6 to Grade 12, and it offers a boarding program from Grades 8 to 12. Stuart Hall School was established in 1827. The head of the school is Jason Coady. In the school review website Niche, Stuart Hall School was the 34th best private high school in Virginia in 2022.

== History ==
In 1827, Stuart Hall started as Mrs. Maria Sheffey's school which held classes in her Staunton home - Kalorama. It was called Kalorama Seminary. In 1844, they renamed the school to "Virginia Female Institute." The School was the oldest preparatory school for women in Virginia.

Old Main is a three-story, five-bay, brick Greek Revival style building completed in 1844, which was designed and built by Edwin Taylor. It has a two-story, three-bay, Doric order portico with a simple heavy frieze supported by four-paneled piers. It was added to the National Register of Historic Places in 1974. It is located in the Newtown Historic District. The school first only had 50 students in 1844. By the year of 1856, the school had grown to over 100 girls attending, including Eleanor Agnes Lee and Anne Custis Lee, daughters of Robert E. Lee.

During the American Civil War, the school's building was used to house the Virginia School for the Deaf and the Blind while the latter's building was being used as a hospital. Students then attended classes in a nearby home in Staunton.

The school reopened in 1865 after the war. Robert E. Lee served as the president of the board of governors at the school. Mrs. Flora Cooke Stuart, widow of Confederate cavalryman, J.E.B. "Jeb" Stuart, became to the head of school in 1880. The curriculum expanded from not only English and Religion, to offering a variety of foreign languages, sciences, and mathematics. Later, the school changed the name to Stuart Hall taken from the headmaster at the time, Flora Cooke Stuart, from 1880 to 1899 who claimed, "the school’s high character in every department gives it an enviable name among schools."

In 1992, the Middle School was opened, serving male and female day students in Grades 6 to 8. In 1999, boys were accepted as day students into the Upper School. In 2007, Stuart Hall School merged with Hunter McGuire School in Verona, VA, and again became a K-12 independent school. A prekindergarten class was added in 2008. In 2020 the school decided to "phase out" the lower grades and by 2023 will serve students in grades 6–12. The Hunter McGuire Lower School was sold in 2021.

== Traditions ==
Traditions at Stuart Hall School can be traced to the school's founding. The traditions include a variety of events, such as athletic competitions, school celebrations, class activities, etc. Leavetaking is a tradition that takes place before each major break, where students and faculty line up and say goodbye to each other individually.

=== Red and White Competition ===
The Stuart Hall School community has been divided into two teams since the 19th century - Red and White. Throughout the school year, competitions take place during Red and White Field Day. The team with a higher score previously gained a trophy and special winnings, but now only claim bragging rights. Incoming students will randomly pick their colors from a bag in the Red and White ceremony at the beginning of the school year. Students who have parents or siblings who are "legacy" have the privilege to choose their "legacy" color.

=== Honor Code Signing ===
In a chapel ceremony at the beginning of each school year, all students sign the Honor Code, where they pledge not to "lie, cheat, steal, or tolerate the behavior of those who do".

=== Ring Ceremony ===
Ring Ceremony occurs in the fall of each school year when seniors are given their school ring, a black onyx engraved with "SH." The ring was designed in the 1920s. Seniors' names and a brief introduction are read aloud by the Sophomore class during the ceremony.

=== Loving Cup Ceremony/Ushers ===
Each senior picks an usher and a sub-usher to participate and accompany in these special ceremonies throughout the year. An usher is a Stuart Hall School student, and a sub-usher is an alumnus in good standing. Ushers use garlanded shepherd's crooks to form an arch for seniors to process during the Graduation ceremony. Sub-ushers toast their seniors in the Loving Cup ceremony, the night before Graduation.

== Notable alumni ==
- Eleanor Agnes Lee, diarist and poet
- Juliette Gordon Low - founder of the Girl Scouts of the USA
- Anne McCaffrey, science fiction author
- Shelby Shackelford, artist
- Jane Stuart Smith, operatic soprano, hymnologist, and author
- Nell Zink, novelist, author of "The Wallcreeper", and "Mislaid"
- Abby Kasonik, artist
