= Trinity Episcopal Church (Staunton, Virginia) =

Historic church in Virginia, US

- U.S. National Register of Historic Places
- U.S. Historic district – Contributing property
- Virginia Landmarks Register
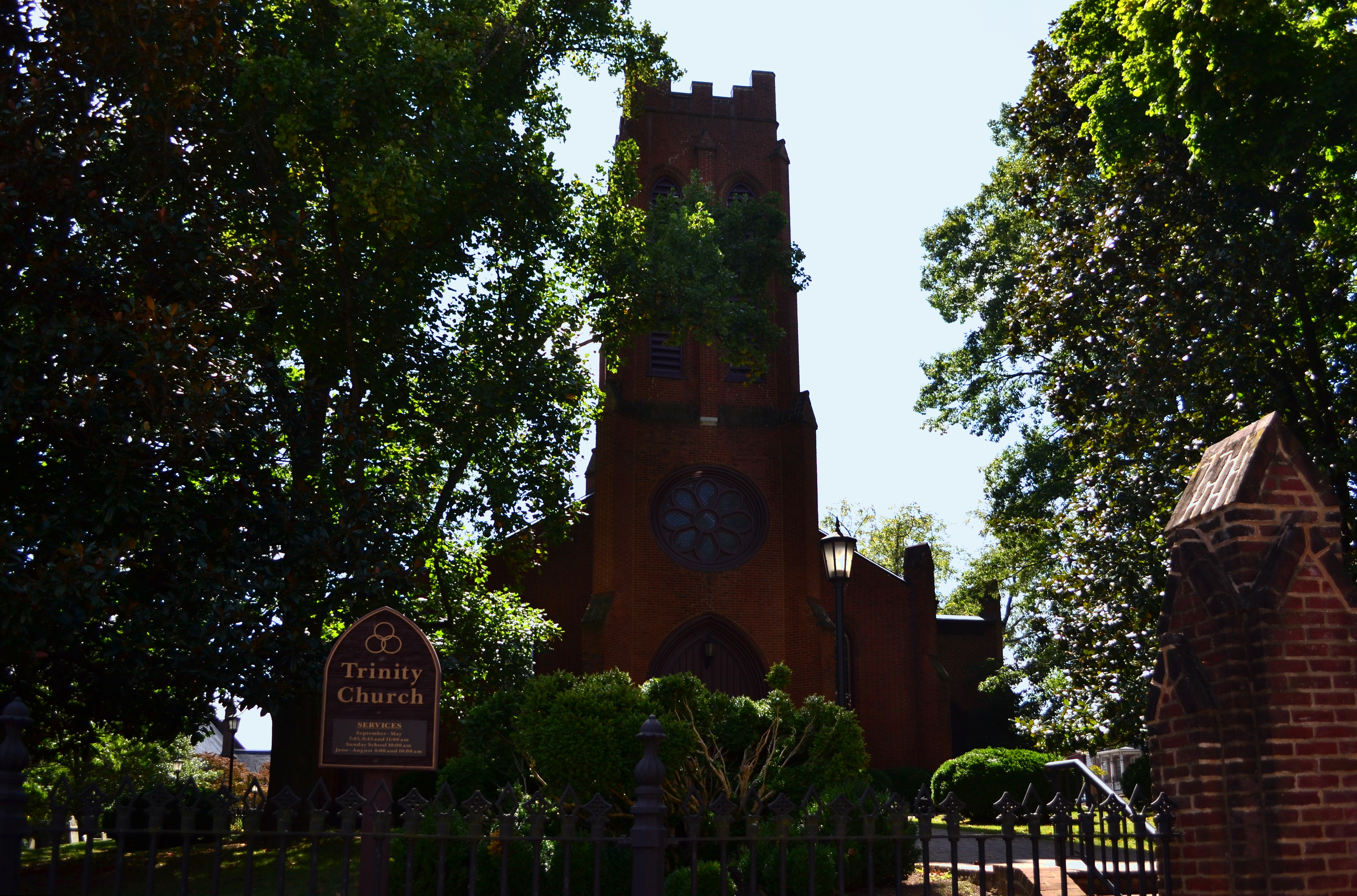
- Trinity Episcopal Church

- Location within Virginia Location within the United States
- Location: 214 West Beverley Street, Staunton, Virginia
- Coordinates: 38°8′55″N 79°4′31″W
- Area: 9.9 acres (4.0 ha)
- Built: 1855
- Architect: Taylor, Edwin M.
- Architectural style: Gothic Revival
- NRHP reference No.: 72001532
- VLR No.: 132-0007

Significant dates
- Added to NRHP: May 5, 1972
- Designated VLR: January 18, 1972

The Trinity Episcopal Church, Staunton VA. is a Gothic Revival style building in Staunton, Virginia. It is an active Episcopal church in the Diocese of Southwestern Virginia. It was listed on the National Register of Historic Places (NRHP) in 1972. It is located in the Newtown Historic District.

== History ==
The current building is the third church building that has been built on the site. Founded first as Augusta Parish Church in 1746. In 1747, the Reverend John Hindman became the first rector. This church, Augusta Parish Church, served as the only government of Augusta County until 1780, when the Parish Vestry was dissolved by legislative act. It is the oldest church in Staunton. In May 1781, the Virginia General Assembly fled Monticello ahead of advancing British troops, and landed in Staunton, where they set up the assembly in Augusta Parish Church, from June 7 to June 23 of that same year.

== Building ==
Founded in 1746 as Augusta Parish, Trinity is the oldest church in Staunton and one of the first Episcopal congregations west of the Blue Ridge Mountains. The first building was completed in 1763. English architect James Wood Johns designed the present church, the third on the site, which was built between 1852 and 1855 in the Early Gothic Revival style. Subsequent additions and renovations have significantly altered the original appearance of the simple brick building. The aisles were widened in 1869-72 and the chancel was extended in 1887. In 1907, 1936, 1955, and 2000 the interior was refurbished. The interior was again rebuilt in 1957, due to the addition of a 20-ton organ. The church properties underwent a massive renovation in 1999–2000. Air conditioning and new electrical systems were added. The stained glass windows were cleaned, repaired, and fitted with new protective glass. The current organ was installed in 2000, as part of the renovation. The church also offers an outdoor brick labyrinth, which was added in 2010.

== Windows ==
One of the artistic features in historic Staunton is the magnificent array of stained-glass windows in Trinity Church. Five distinct styles of glass can be discerned. The oldest windows in the church, which date from the 1850s, consist of non-figurative glass cut into diamond-shaped pieces. The colors alternate between a translucent white and a pale sepia. The borders, on the other hand, consist of clear glass in deep colors --- sapphire blue, emerald green, topaz yellow---overlaid with a painted black scroll pattern and joined by clear red panes with painted rosette designs in the corners. Five of these windows survive in sitù. They include the rose-shaped window in the tower, which is not visible inside, and two windows below on each side of the entrance, which is in the lower part of the tower.

The second period of American church glass decoration in Trinity Church exemplifies the Arts and Crafts Movement, which was a significant, purely American contribution to the glassmaking industry. Around 1825, American glass companies, most notably that in Sandwich, Massachusetts, developed an economical mechanized method of pressing molten glass with a metal plumber to form faceted “jewels,” flowers, and other shapes. Although probably more often associated with tableware, pressed glass was also incorporated into church windows. The geometric designs, often based on colorful Bohemian patterns, were characterized by bright colors and faceted glass jewels. The Passion Window and the Trinity Window (c.1872-80), located on the west side of the church, and the Narcissus Window (c.1887) in the east aisle represent examples of Arts and Crafts Glass.

The third type of American glass in Trinity Church shows Christian symbols set against colored glass backgrounds. The Geometrical Window in the west aisle, the only surviving window designed by the prestigious New York firm of Sharp and Steele, exemplifies this period of stained glass decoration. This tall lancet window, which dates from the mid-1870s, features eight circular medallions set against red fields with deep blue borders. Several techniques were used to apply the paint, including positive and negative stencils and hand-painted lines. when the chancel was first enlarged, at least seven Sharp and Steele windows filled the chancel. They are evident in vintage photographs.

By the turn of the twentieth century, parishioners at Trinity Church began to replace some of the older windows with memorial windows of a new type of glass called “opalescent,” which represents the fourth style of glass at Trinity Church. As with the pressed glass of the mid-nineteenth century, these new opalescent windows also represented a purely American development. This glass was popularized by such artists as Frederick Lamb of J&R Lamb Studios, John La Farge, Maitland Armstrong, and Louis Comfort Tiffany. Trinity Church owns thirteen opalescent windows, one by the prestigious studio of J&R Lamb (The Nativity, c.1905) and a dozen by Louis Comfort Tiffany. Dating 1898 to 1936, these windows offer a rare variety of subjects and show the development of Tiffany's style. Most of the windows bear a signature; Some are dated. The array of Tiffany Windows offers a mini-retrospective of his career within the overall retrospective of American stained glass at Trinity Church. The oldest and perhaps the finest Tiffany window is The Ascension (1899), a composition over the altar that consists of three windows. The other Tiffany windows are: Angel with a Script and St. Luke in the chancel; Easter Morn (2 windows), The Good Samaritan, Faith (Angel), Madonna in the east aisle; and, in the west aisle, St. Michael the Archangel and the Benedicite Window, which shows a garden.

Although the Tiffany formulae for opalescent glass were destroyed at the time of Louis Comfort Tiffany's death in 1933, per his request, Tiffany glass continued to be available until the early 1950s from the Tiffany glass shop in New York. The Madonna Window is the only one in Trinity Church from this period.

After World War II, opalescent windows began to fade from fashion. Instead, American churches began to favor windows that emulated of the style of medieval European church windows. These windows, fabricated of small pieces of mouth-blown glass, included designs consisting of both figures and symbols. Primary predominate, along with greens and a little white. The J&R Lamb Company and several other companies in the United States and England strove to meet popular demand. In 1946, Lamb Studios made the Wise Men Window as a companion to the Nativity Window that the company had fabricated some forty years earlier for the same donor family. By then, the style of Lamb glass had changed dramatically. The Wise Men window is rendered in a Neo-Gothic style, with deeper colors and more angular lines.

In 1948, a new donor turned to Wippell Studios of England, a decision that not only reflected the embracing of the English origins of the denomination but also it established the pattern for the rest of the church window decoration.

Wippell, which later opened offices in New Jersey as Wippell-Mowbray, designed nine windows for Trinity Church between 1948 and 1970. Their style emulates English Gothic windows. The colors of the glass are bright, mainly primary colors. They are: the Communion and Missionary Windows in the west aisle; The Sermon on the Mount and the Jewels Triptych (3 windows) in the chancel; Archbishop Crammer in the east aisle; and the diocesan shields in the narthex.

== Church ==
The current rector is the Rev. William A. J. Heine ("AJ"), who began at Trinity Episcopal, Staunton in 2021. According to the church website, Fr. AJ is particularly interested in “Growing community, crossing borders, building bridges, and connecting people to the love of God in Jesús Christ is the source of my greatest joy and the best way I know to unleash the power of God’s love to heal the world.”

The church website lists office hours as Monday through Friday from 9:00 am to 5:00 pm, except in summer, when the office closes at 12:00 noon on Fridays.
